= Cana, Benin =

Cana
- city
- Location in Benin
- Coordinates: 7°7′N 2°4′E
- Country: Benin
- Department: Zou Department
- Arrondissement: Cana I / Cana II

Population
  - Ethnicities: Fon people
- Time zone: UTC+1 (WAT)

Cana is a town in the Zou Department of south-western Benin, just southeast of Bohicon. The city was an important administrative and trade hub under the Kingdom of Dahomey, and was a stop on the royal road leading from the capital Abomey to Whydah and the Oyo Empire. The Kings of Dahomey built multiple palaces in Cana which served as administrative headquarters and pens for enslaved people on the way to the coast, where they were sold to Europeans.

Today the main industry of the town revolves around the oil processing plant.

== Notable people ==
- Christophe Adimou, former bishop of Cotonou

== See also ==
- Cana I and Cana II, arrondissements in the Zou department of Benin
