= Aguna language =

Language spoken in Benin and Togo

Aguna
- Awuna
- Agunaco
- Native to: Benin, Togo
- Ethnicity: Aja people
- Native speakers: 28,000 (2013–2014)
- Language family: Niger–Congo?: Atlantic–Congo; Volta–Congo; Gbe; Western; Aguna

Official status
- Recognised minority language in: Benin

Language codes
- ISO 639-3: aug
- Glottolog: agun1238
- ELP: Aguna

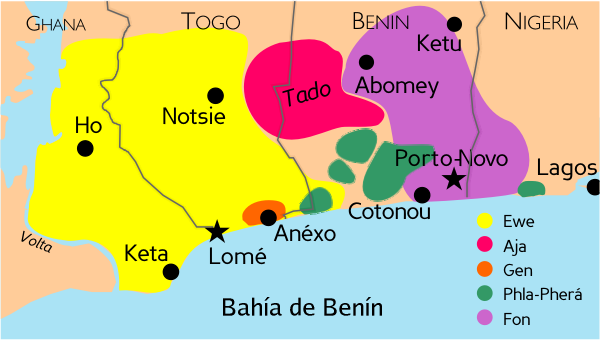

Aguna, or Awuna, is a Gbe language of Benin and Togo. In Benin it is spoken in the villages of Agouna, Koutagba, Gangan, Sankpiti, Djégékpodji and other surrounding areas in the Agouna arrondissement and in the villages of; Tchie, Kokoroko, Aklienme, Vevi and Outo (Hounto) in the Outo arrondissement, both in the Djidja commune of the Zou Department.

In Togo, the language is spoken in the villages of; Glitto, Dasagba and Couffota (Koufota) in the Anié Prefecture.
