= Cové =

- Commune and city
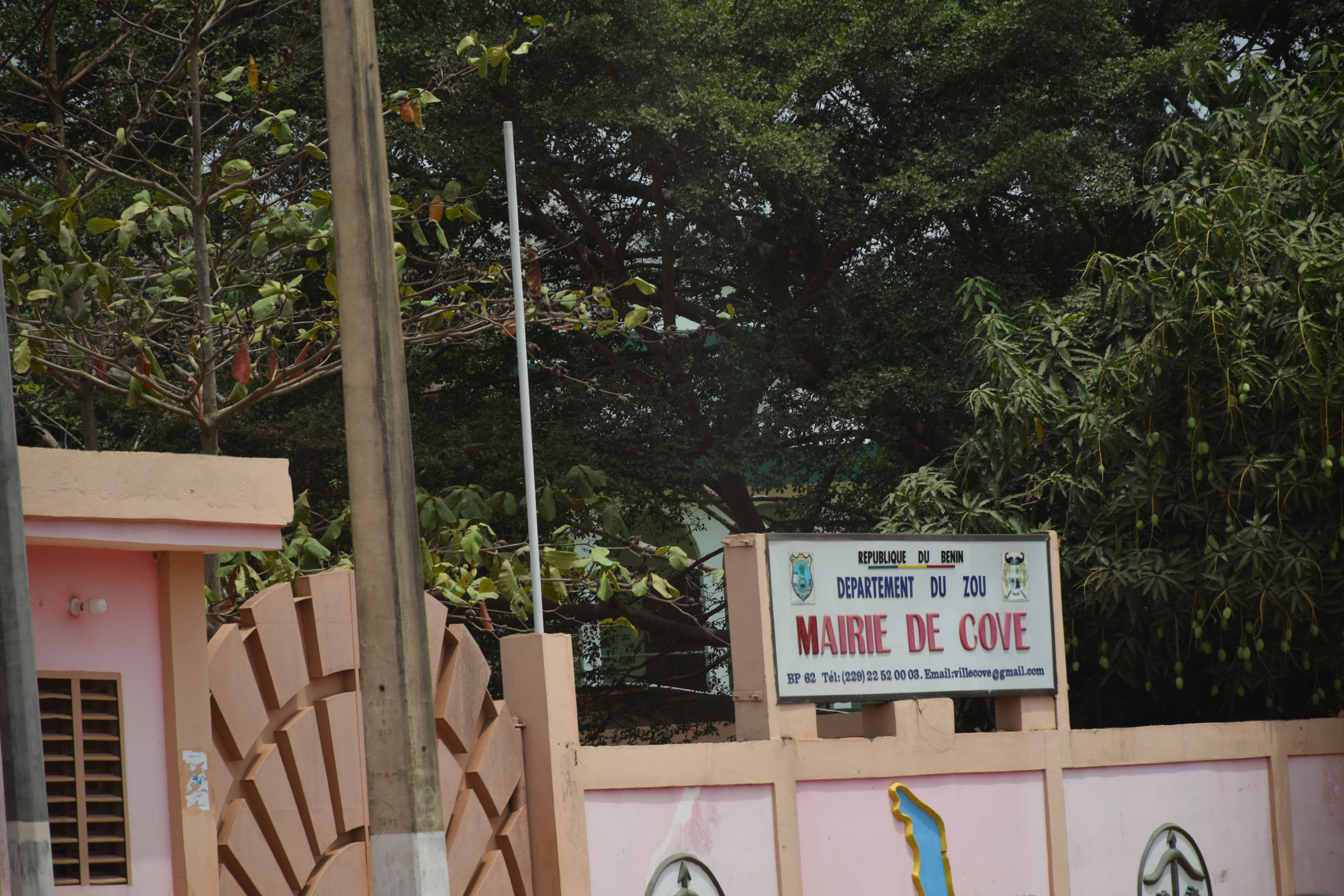
- Town hall of Cové

- Location in Benin
- Coordinates: 7°13′07″N 2°20′21″E
- Country: Benin
- Department: Zou Department

Area
  - Total: 525 km^{2} (203 sq mi)
- Elevation: 114 m (374 ft)

Population (2012)
  - Total: 43,554
  - Density: 83.0/km^{2} (215/sq mi)
- Time zone: UTC+01:00 (WAT)

Cové [kɔ.ve] is a city in the Zou Department of Benin. The commune covers an area of 525 square kilometres and as of 2012 had a population of 43,554 people.

== Geography ==
Cové is located 40 kilometres from Abomey and 159 kilometres from Cotonou. The commune covers an area of 525 square kilometres and the Zou Ouémé river passes through it. It is bounded to the north by Dassa-Zoumé, east by Zagnanado, south by Zogbodomey, and west by Djidja and Za-Kpota. It is linked to the capital by a paved road. Cové became a sub-prefecture in 1991.

== Administrative divisions ==
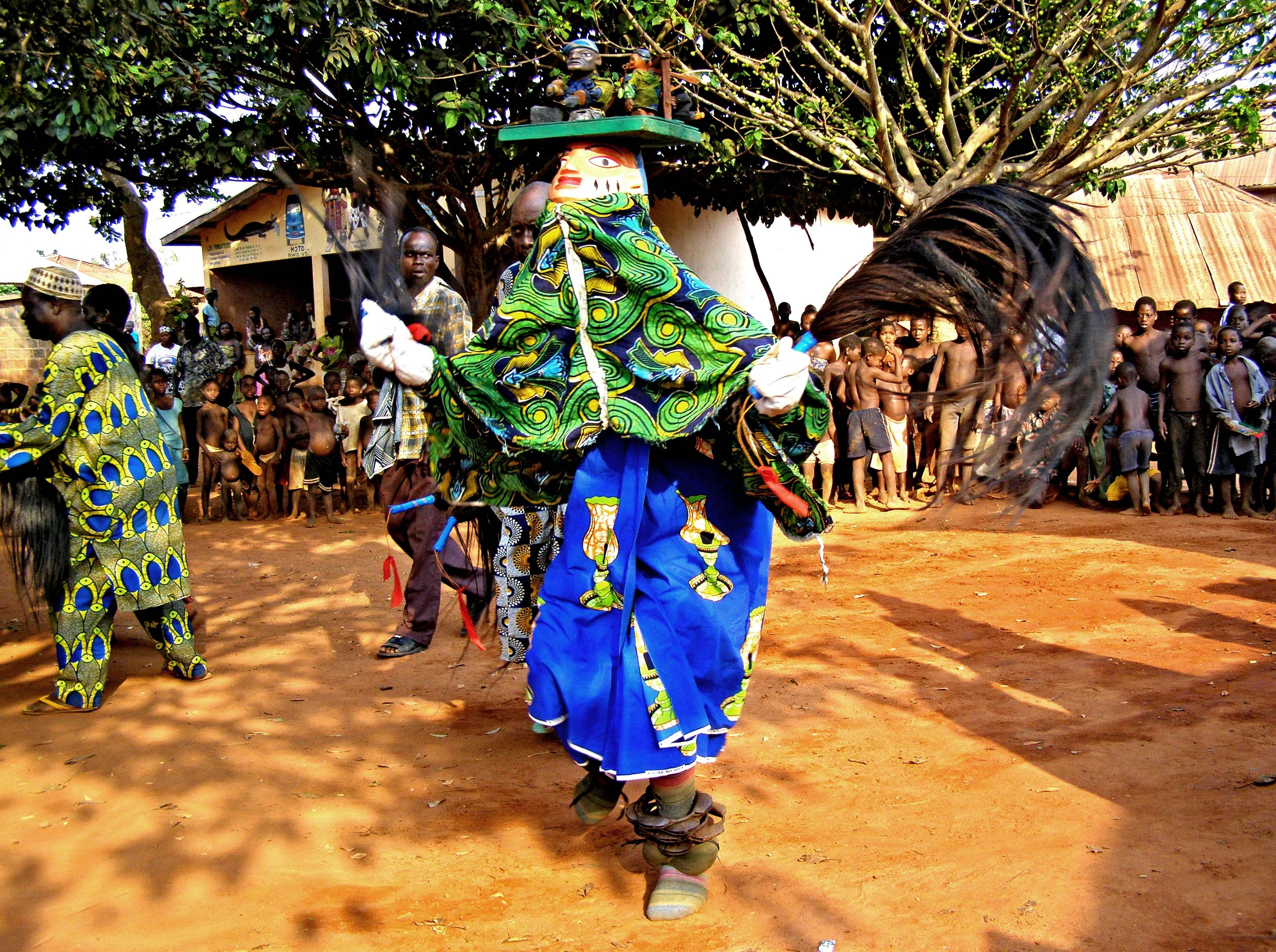

Cové is subdivided into 7 arrondissements; Adogbé, Gounli, Houin, Lainta, Naogon, Soli and Zogba. They contain 36 quartiers.

== Economy ==
The main ethnic groups are the Mahi, the Fon, Yoruba, Dendi and Bariba. The occupations of the inhabitants are agriculture, fishing and hunting (42%), trade and catering (30%), transport and communication (6%) crafts (11%) etc. 53 600,00 hectares of land are devoted to agriculture, accounting for 93.38% of the total population. The main crops grown are maize, cotton, peanuts, cassava and rice.

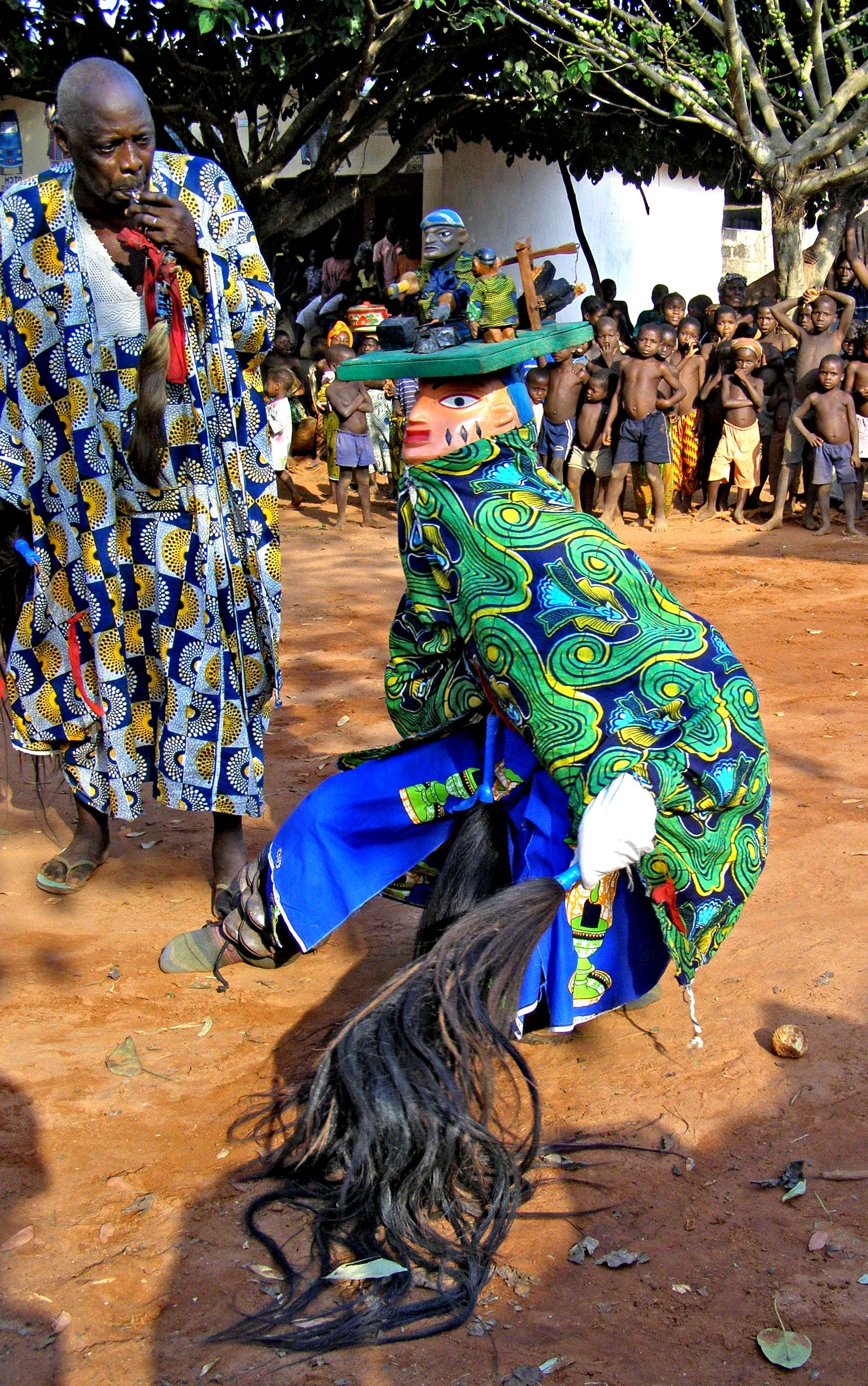

== Gelede Masked Festival gallery ==
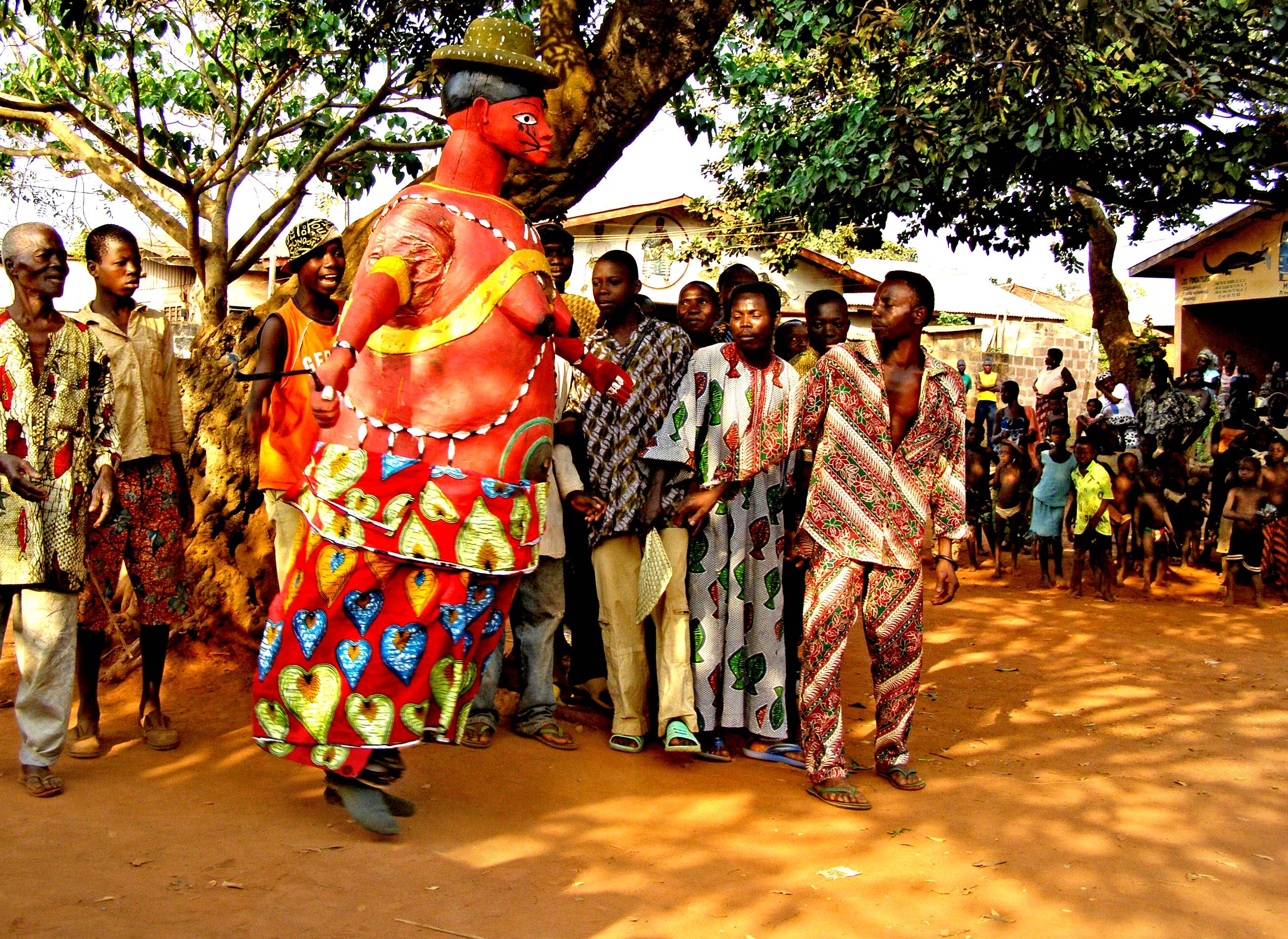

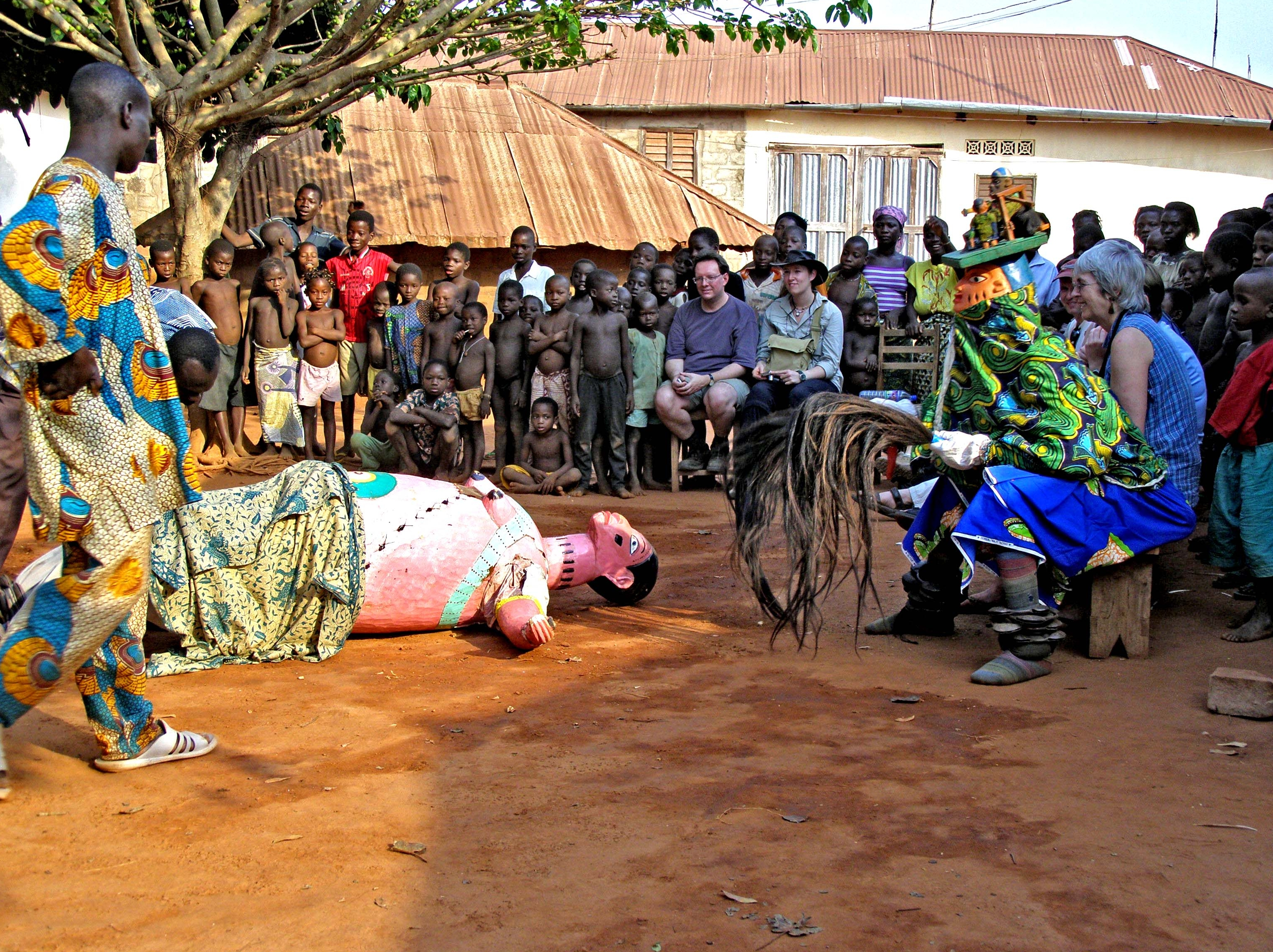
