= Agbangnizoun =

- Commune and city
- Location in Benin
- Coordinates: 7°4′N 1°58′E
- Country: Benin
- Department: Zou Department

Area
  - Total: 94 sq mi (244 km^{2})

Population (2002)
  - Total: 55,001
- Time zone: UTC+1 (WAT)

Agbangnizoun [ag.bɑ̃.ɲi.zun] is a town, arrondissement, and commune in the Zou Department of south-western Benin. The town lies 20 kilometres south-east of Abomey. The commune covers an area of 244 square kilometres and as of 2002 had a population of 55,001 people.

== Geography ==
Agbangnizoun is located 16 kilometres from Abomey and 151 kilometres from Cotonou. It is bounded to the north by Abomey and Djidja, south by Couffo, east by the communes of Bohicon and Zogbodomey and the west by the town of Klouékanmè.

== Administrative divisions ==
Agbangnizoun is subdivided into 10 arrondissements; Agbangnizoun, Adanhoundjigon, Adingnigon, Kinta, Lissazounmè, Sahè, Siwé-Kpota, Siwé-Légo, Tanvé and Zoungoudo. They contain 45 villages and 7 city districts.

== Economy ==
Most of the population is engaged in agricultural activities followed by trade, transportation and handicrafts. 6 800,00 hectares of land are devoted to agriculture, accounting for 34.87% of the total population. The main crops grown are maize, cotton, sorghum, cowpeas, peanuts, cassava and potato.

== Settlements ==
- Manala
