= Zagnanado =

- Commune and city
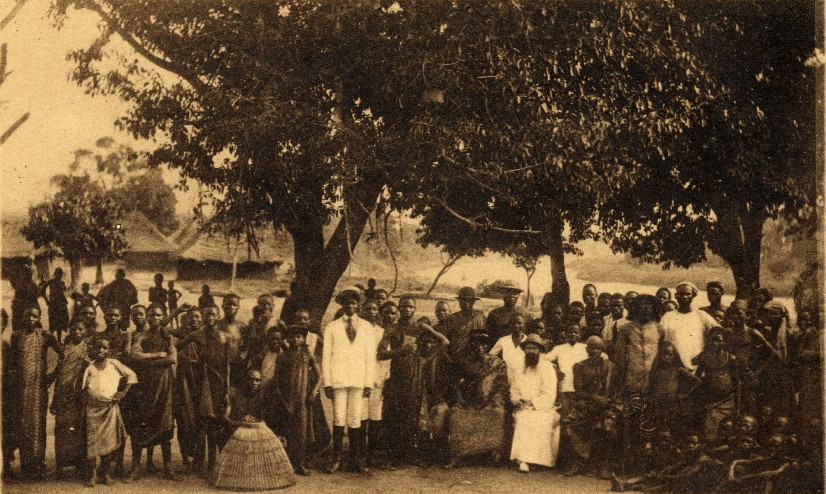
- Missionaries in Zagnanado, c.1910s

- Location in Benin
- Coordinates: 7°16′N 2°21′E
- Country: Benin
- Department: Zou Department

Area
  - Total: 290 sq mi (750 km^{2})

Population (2013)
  - Total: 132,401
- Time zone: UTC+1 (WAT)

Zagnanado [za.ɲɑ̃.na.do] or Zangnanado [zɑ̃.ɲɑ̃.na.do] is a town, arrondissement, and commune in the Zou Department of southern-central Benin. It is located 47 kilometres from Abomey and 165 kilometres north of Cotonou. The commune covers an area of 750 square kilometres and as of 2013 had a population of 132,401 people.

== Zagnanado ==
The territorial entity that is today the municipality of Zagnanado has undergone several administrative changes since the colonial period until today. Since the early eighteenth century, the region depended on the kingdom of Abomey. Guézo made the area headquarters of the army during his campaigns against the Yoruba of Kétou and Abeokuta. By the Act of June 21, 1895, King Agoli-Agbo, he authorised full authority over the Agonlin region. In the early twentieth century, Zagnanado and surrounding villages were visited by many missionaries who spread Christianity. During the colonial period and into the 1970s, Agonlin remained a single administrative entity. However, in 1978 it was divided into three communes, Zagnanado, Covè and Ouinhi.

== Geography ==
3 rivers flow through the commune, the longest flows through for 93 kilometers. Zagnanado is bordered by Dassa-Zoumè to the north, Ouinhi and Zogbodomè to the south, Covè, Za-Kpota and Djidja to the west and Adja-Ouèrè and Kétou to the east.

== Administrative divisions ==
Zagnanado is subdivided into six arrondissements, Agonlin-Houégbo, Banami, Don-Tan, Dovi, Kpedekpo and Zagnanado. They contain 27 villages and 7 city districts.

== Demographics ==
The population of Zagnanado is dominated by two major ethnic groups; Mahi representing 90.5% and Yoruba representing 8.1% and the rest minorities. The main religions are Christianity (47.2%), animism (30.5%) and Islam (2.8%).

The population of the commune of Zagnanado, according to the 2002 census is 36,756 people, which is 6.1% of the population of the Zou Department. Data from the last census shows that from 1992 to 2002, the population Zagnanado experienced a small increase of 0.7% per year while between 1979 and 1992 growth was about 2.2% per year.
