= Vidole schreineri =

Hanover Vidole Hackled Band Spider

Conservation status
- Least Concern (SANBI Red List)

Scientific classification
- Kingdom: Animalia
- Phylum: Arthropoda
- Subphylum: Chelicerata
- Class: Arachnida
- Order: Araneae
- Infraorder: Araneomorphae
- Family: Phyxelididae
- Genus: Vidole
- Species: V. schreineri

Binomial name
- Vidole schreineri (Purcell, 1904)

Synonyms
- Auximus schreineri Purcell, 1904

Species of spider

Vidole schreineri is a species of spider in the family Phyxelididae. It is endemic to South Africa and is commonly known as the Hanover Vidole hackled band spider.

== Distribution ==
Vidole schreineri is distributed across two South African provinces, Eastern Cape and Northern Cape. The species occurs at altitudes ranging from 444 to 1,513 m above sea level.

== Habitat and ecology ==
This species inhabits the Grassland biome and drier regions. Vidole schreineri is a ground retreat-web cryptic spider that lives in dark places. Label data suggests that it occurs in arid Karoo and Little Karoo vegetation.

== Conservation ==
Vidole schreineri is listed as Least Concern by the South African National Biodiversity Institute. It has a wide range and is protected in the Addo Elephant National Park and Mountain Zebra National Park. There are no significant threats to the species.

== Taxonomy ==
The species was originally described by William Frederick Purcell in 1904 as Auximus schreineri from Hanover in the Northern Cape. It was later transferred to the genus Vidole and revised by Griswold in 1990, who removed it from synonymy with Vidole capensis. Vidole schreineri is known from both sexes.
