= Zoukou =

Zoukou may refer to several places in Benin:

- Zoukou, Djidja
- Zoukou, Zogbodomey
