= Naogon =

Coordinates: 7°14′N 2°20′E

- Arrondissement
- Interactive map of Naogon
- Country: Benin
- Department: Zou Department
- Commune: Cové

Population (2002)
  - Total: 6,434
- Time zone: UTC+1 (WAT)

Naogon is an arrondissement in the Zou department of Benin. It is an administrative division under the jurisdiction of the commune of Cové. According to the population census conducted by the Institut National de la Statistique Benin on February 15, 2002, the arrondissement had a total population of 6,434.

Naogon, like many areas of Benin, is home to a constituent monarchy.
