= Leopold Ahoueya =

Minister of Public Transport of Benin
- In office 1978–1980

Personal details
- Born: 1941 Dago, Zagnando, French Dahomey (now Benin)
- Died: February 7, 2006 (aged 64–65) Hopital Cochin, 14th arronidissement of Paris, Paris, France

Military service
- Allegiance: Dahomeyan Armed Forces (1962–1972); Beninese Armed Forces (1972–1990)
- Rank: Lieutenant Colonel
- Battles/wars: 1972 Dahomeyan coup d'état

Leopold Ahoueya was a Beninois military officer who served as Minister of Defense of Benin from 1974 to 1980.

== Biography ==
Ahoueya was born in Doga, a village in the commune of Zagnanado, French Dahomey (now Benin) in 1941. He was called up for military service in the Dahomean Armed Forces in 1962, and was promoted to Second Lieutenant in the Gendarmerie on October 1, 1968. Ahoueya was then promoted to lieutenant on October 1, 1970.

Between 1972 and 1975, Ahoueya was director of the Special Recovery Bureau and the first secretary of the National Revolutionary Council. He participated in the 1972 Dahomeyan coup d'état that brought Mathieu Kérékou to power, and in 1973, supported Kerekou's government's efforts to promote Beninois bands and the Gendarmerie's National Orchestra, also known as the Volcans. In 1978, Ahoueya was appointed Minister of Public Works. He visited Muammar Gaddafi in Libya in 1979, signing an air transport agreement with Muri Fitriri. In 1986, he was promoted to lieutenant-colonel.

Ahoueya died on February 7, 2006, at Hôpital Cochin in the 14th arrondissement of Paris, France, at the age of 65. The Leopold Ahoueya Foundation was created by his relative Albert Ahoueya in October 2006 in his honor.
