= Zoungoudo =

Coordinates: 7°01′N 1°59′E

- Arrondissement
- Interactive map of Zoungoudo
- Country: Benin
- Department: Zou Department
- Commune: Agbangnizoun

Population (2002)
  - Total: 2,135
- Time zone: UTC+1 (WAT)

Zoungoudo is an arrondissement in the Zou department of Benin. It is an administrative division under the jurisdiction of the commune of Agbangnizoun. According to the population census conducted by the Institut National de la Statistique Benin on February 15, 2002, the arrondissement had a total population of 2,135.
