= Manala =

Manala may refer to:

- Manala, Benin
- Manala, eighth full-length album by Finnish folk metal band Korpiklaani, released in 2012
- Another name for Tuonela, the underworld in Finnish and Estonian mythologies

== See also ==
- Mannala, a brioche baked in Alsace (France) for Saint Nicholas Day
