= Sahe =

Sahe or SAHE may refer to:

== Places ==
- Sahé, Benin
- Sahe, Cameroon, the location of Nkondjock Hôpital de District; see list of hospitals in Cameroon#Littoral
- Sohu, Iran, also spelled Sahe
- Sahe, a settlement in Ndiass rural community, Senegal

== Other ==
- Sahe language, an Austronesian language of Papua New Guinea
- Caviahue Airport, Argentina (former ICAO code: SAHE)
- Sahe, the tail code of the Saeki Naval Air Group of the Imperial Japanese Navy; see List of air groups of the Imperial Japanese Navy

== See also ==
- Sri Siddhartha Academy of Higher Education (SSAHE)
