= Ouinhi =

- Commune and city
- Location in Benin
- Coordinates: 7°20′N 2°27′E
- Country: Benin
- Department: Zou Department

Area
  - Total: 186 sq mi (483 km^{2})

Population (2013)
  - Total: 59,381
- Time zone: UTC+1 (WAT)

Ouinhi [wi.ni] is a town, arrondissement, and commune in the Zou Department of south-western Benin. The commune covers an area of 483 square kilometres and as of 2013 had a population of 59,381 people. It is bounded on the north-west by the commune of Zagnanado, south-west by the commune of Zogbodomey, south by the commune of Bonou and east by the commune of Adja-Ouèrè. The commune is divided into arrondissements which include Dasso, Ouinhi, and Tohu, comprising 28 villages.

The arrondissements of Ouinhi and Dasso were struck hard by the 2008 Benin floods in July 2008, tearing down mud and straw homes and infrastructure and polluting rivers.
