= Zeko =

Zeko may refer to:

- Zèko, Benin
- Zecco Department (Farefare: Zẽkɔ), Burkina Faso

== People with the given name ==
- Nakamura Yoshikoto or Nakamura Zekō (1867–1927), Japanese politician
- Zeko Torbov (1899–1987), Bulgarian writer who won the Herder Prize in 1970
- Zeko Burgess (fl. 2019), Bermudian cricketer
