= Mougnon =

Coordinates: 7°14′N 2°01′E

- Arrondissement
- Interactive map of Mougnon
- Country: Benin
- Department: Zou Department
- Commune: Djidja

Population (2002)
  - Total: 5,478
- Time zone: UTC+1 (WAT)

Mougnon is an arrondissement in the Zou department of Benin. It is an administrative division under the jurisdiction of the commune of Djidja. According to the population census conducted by the Institut National de la Statistique Benin on February 15, 2002, the arrondissement had a total population of 5,478.
