= Sessimè =

Beninese musician

Sèssimè
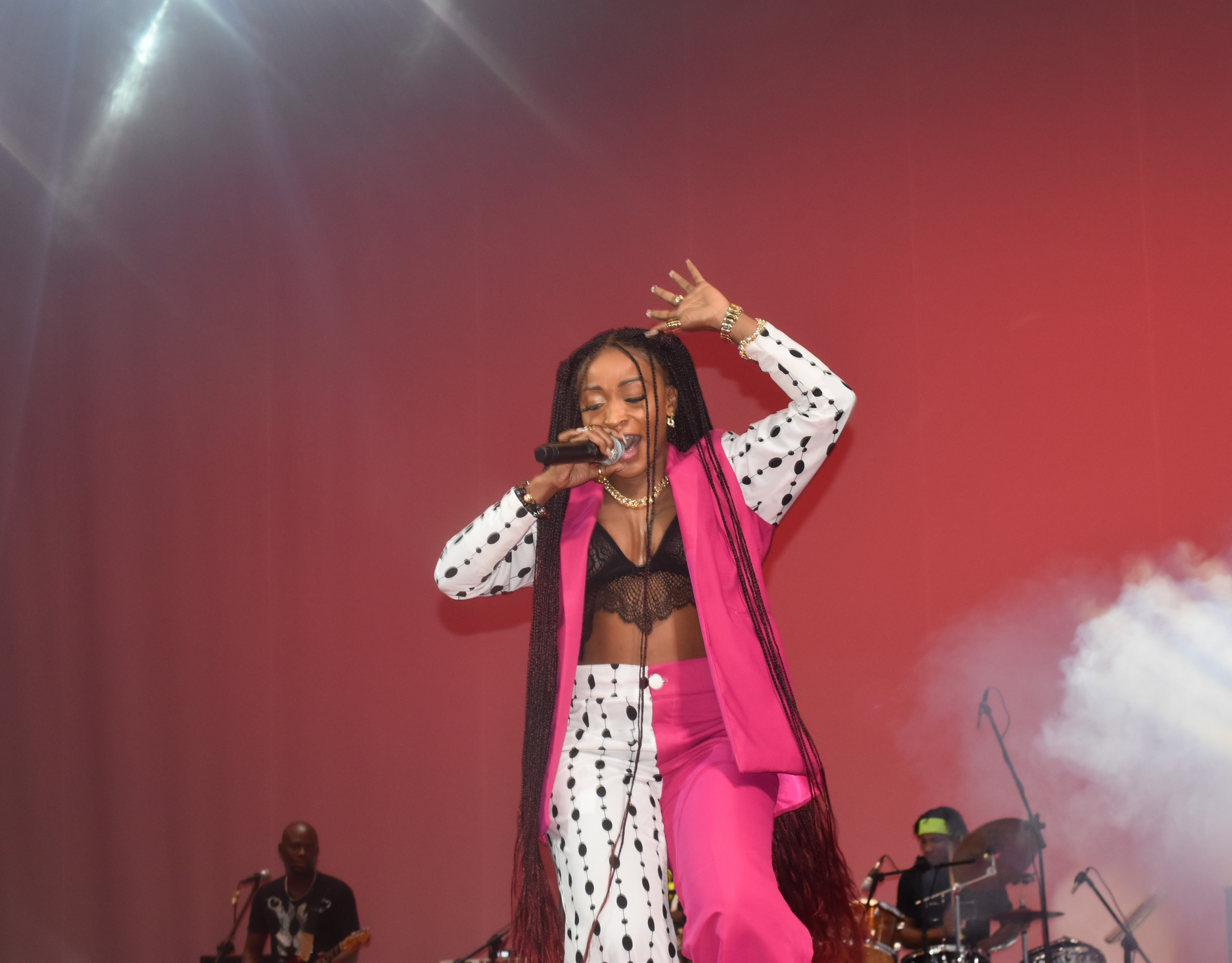
- Born: Bidossessi Christelle Guédou; February 20, 1984 (age 42); Covè
- Parents: Charles Guédou (father); Léontine Houndonou (mother)

Sessimè, whose civil name is Bidossessi Christelle Guédou, born on February 20, 1984, in Covè, Benin, is a Beninese singer-songwriter and performer. Her stage name is derived from her first name, Bidossessi, which means "Everything depends on destiny," or, "Everything is in God's hands." The name Sessimè is therefore another way of saying Bidossessi in the Fon language.

== Biography ==
From the age of 13, Sessimè discovered her love for the arts, thanks to her parents, Charles Guédou and Léontine Houndonou, who passed on to her very early their love for music and dance. Driven by the great ambition of becoming an international star like Michael Jackson and Angélique Kidjo, she adopted an Afropop-rock and zouk style with Beninese and Yoruba colors (afrobeat, tchinkounmey, zinlin). She successfully participated in various school competitions. Her success in the reality TV show called Coca-Cola Star Promo in 2007 was the launching point of her musical care. Her career truly started on the international stage thanks to her second album Wazakoua, released in 2011. In 2012, she was elected Best Female Hope of the African continent at the Kora Awards. She is in a relationship with the artist Nikanor.

== Music awards and prizes ==
- Best artist of the year in Benin Top 10 AWARDS 2019
- 2017 competition on the Benin Top 10 show.
- Runner-up for the Best Artist of the Year 2017 award
- Listeners' choice award
- 2013 finalist in the «Découvertes RFI-FRANCE24» prize competition.
- 2013 Winner of the Facebook contest « TOP20 » organized by the KORAS.
- 2012: Kora Award Best Female Hope of the African Continent.
- 2011, in Benin with the album WAZAKOUA, she was:
- Best artist of modern music with traditional inspiration
- Best music video at the Benin Golden Awards 2011.
- Listeners' choice artist and Best Artist of the Year at Benin Top 10 of ORTB.
- African Grand Prize Best artist of modern music with traditional inspiration at the Sica 2011 festival

== Discography ==
Albums

- 2007 : Why
- 2011 : WAZAKOUA

Singles

- Mayavio
- Moulded tea
- Sètché ho
- Danassoukoui
- Fana Fana (ft Rico Amaj)
- Peace and Unity
- Fashion Groovy
- Follow me (ft Clark Donovan)
- Nayilé
- Ago N’do
- Officialized
- Haya
- Gbadou 2019
- only see you (ft Mr Leo) 2019
- Come dance (ft Faty) 2019
- Guigo 2020
- Addicted 2020
- Tattoo 2021[10]
- Daaga

=== Collaborations or Featuring ===
- Follow me featuring Clark Donovan
- Fana Fana featuring Rico Amaj
- YAYAYE featuring Almok
- Come dance featuring Faty
- I only see you featuring Mr Leo
- Lemiwé featuring Blaaz
