= Kpédékpo =

Coordinates: 7.2529°N 2.4140°E

- Arrondissement
- Interactive map of Kpédékpo
- Country: Benin
- Department: Zou Department
- Commune: Zagnanado

Population (2002)
  - Total: 5,992
- Time zone: UTC+1 (WAT)

Kpédékpo is an arrondissement in the Zou department of Benin. It is an administrative division under the jurisdiction of the commune of Zagnanado. According to the population census conducted by the Institut National de la Statistique Benin on February 15, 2002, the arrondissement had a total population of 5,992.
