= Setto =

- Arrondissement and town
- Location in Benin
- Coordinates: 7°29′16″N 2°04′35″E
- Country: Benin
- Department: Zou Department
- Commune: Djidja
- Arrondissement: Setto
- Time zone: UTC+1 (WAT)

Setto is a town and arrondissement in the Djidja commune of the Zou Department of Benin.
