= Kinta =

Kinta may refer to:

- Kinta District, Malaysia
  - Kinta Valley
- Kinta, Benin
- Kinta, Oklahoma
- Kinta River
- Kinta Tamaoka
- Kinta 1881
- Kinta rubber works
