= Manala, Benin =

Manala
- Town
- Location in Benin
- Coordinates: 7°8′N 1°54′E
- Country: Benin
- Department: Zou Department
- Commune: Agbangnizoun

Area
  - Total: 52 sq mi (135 km^{2})

Population (2001)
  - Total: 12,000
- Time zone: UTC+1 (WAT)

Manala is a small town in the Zou Department of south-western Benin located 35 kilometres from Abomey. As of 2001 it had a population of 12,000. It covers an area of 135 km2 and the main language is French.
