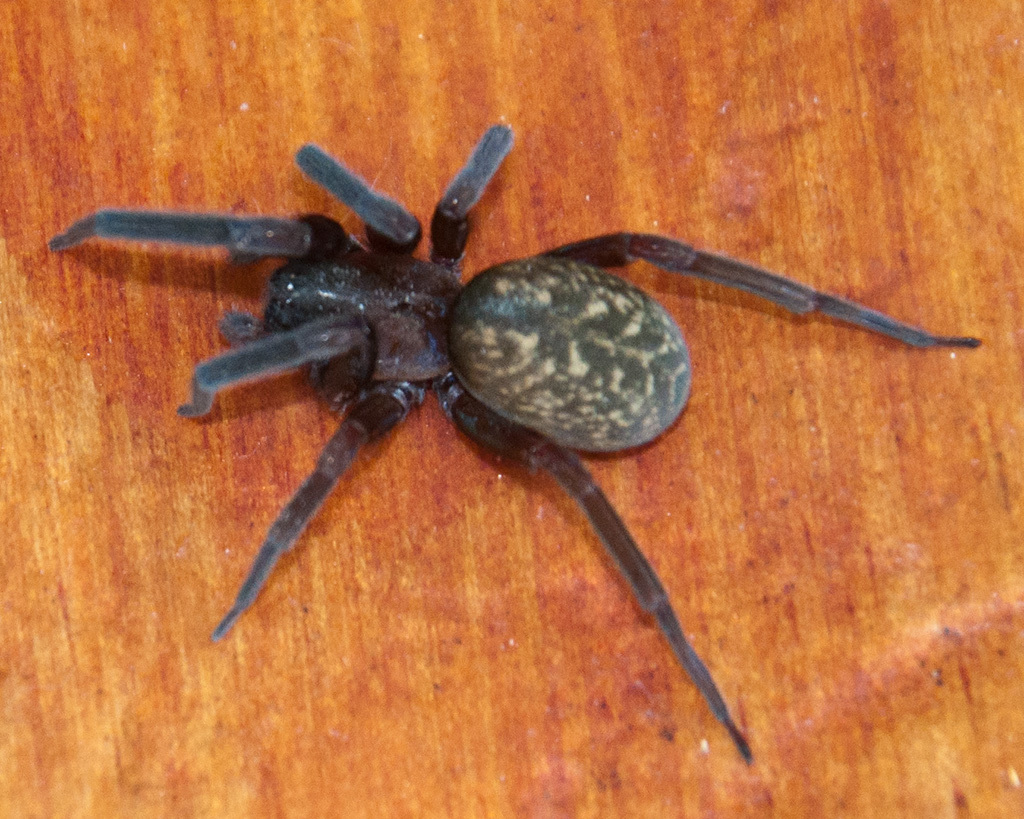

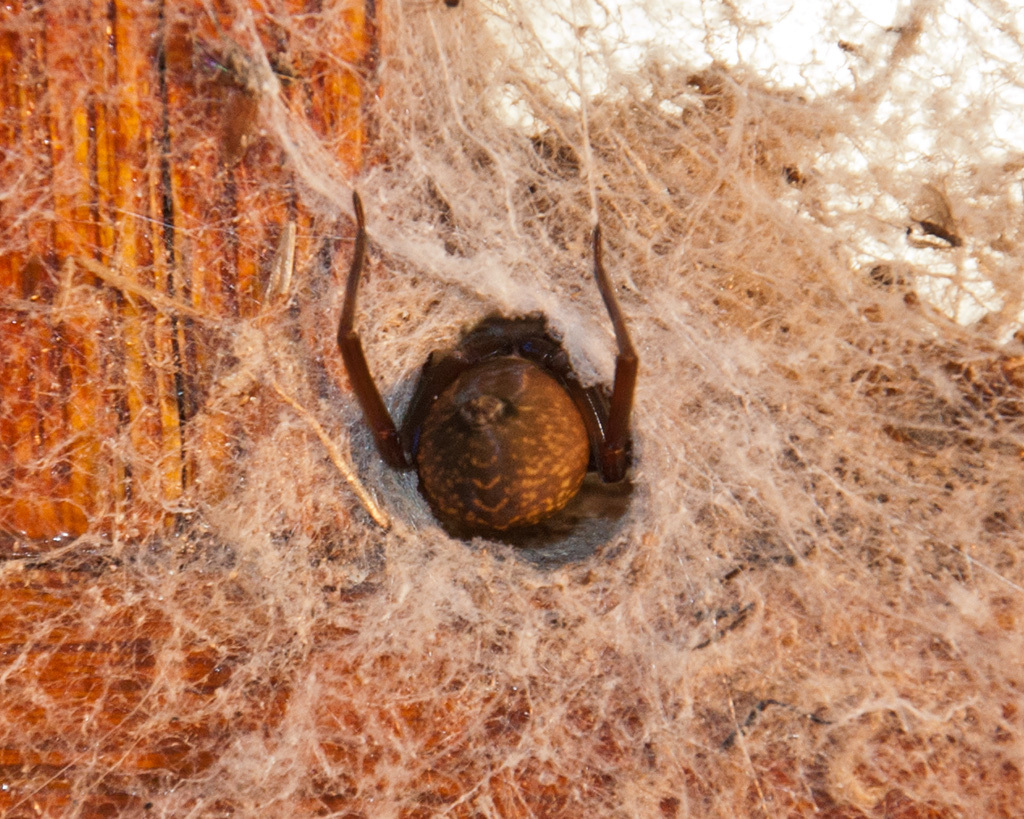

Scientific classification
- Kingdom: Animalia
- Phylum: Arthropoda
- Subphylum: Chelicerata
- Class: Arachnida
- Order: Araneae
- Infraorder: Araneomorphae
- Family: Phyxelididae
- Genus: Vidole
- Species: V. capensis

Binomial name
- Vidole capensis (Pocock, 1900)

Synonyms
- Auximus capensis Pocock, 1900; Amaurobius promontorii Simon, 1906; Haemilla profundissima Lawrence, 1964; Phyxelida profundissima Brignoli, 1983

= Vidole capensis =

Cape Vidole Hackled Band Spider

Species of spider

Vidole capensis is a species of spider in the family Phyxelididae. It is endemic to South Africa and is commonly known as the Cape Vidole hackled band spider. The species serves as the type species for its genus.

== Distribution ==
Vidole capensis is distributed across three South African provinces, Eastern Cape, Northern Cape, and Western Cape. The species occurs at altitudes ranging from 1 to 4,713 m above sea level.

== Habitat and ecology ==
This species inhabits Fynbos, Grassland, Indian Ocean Coastal Belt, Nama Karoo, Savanna, and Thicket biomes. Vidole capensis is a ground retreat-web cryptic spider that lives in damp and dark places. The species has been found in various habitats and has also been sampled from citrus orchards.

== Description ==
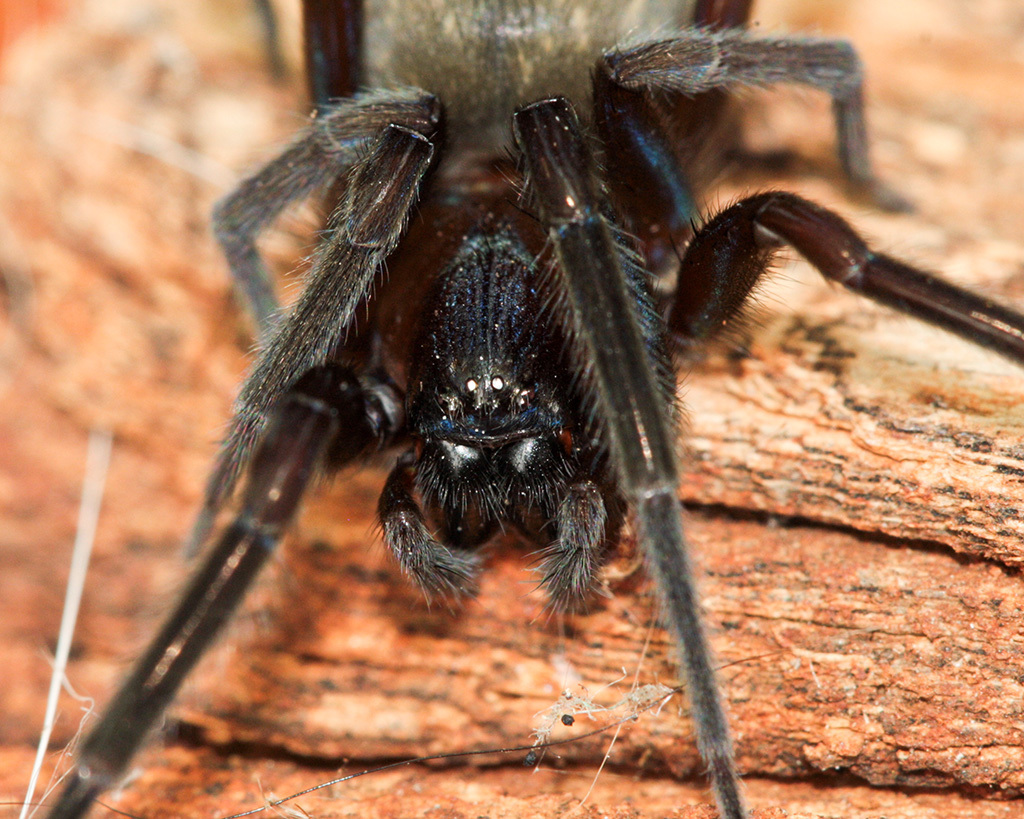

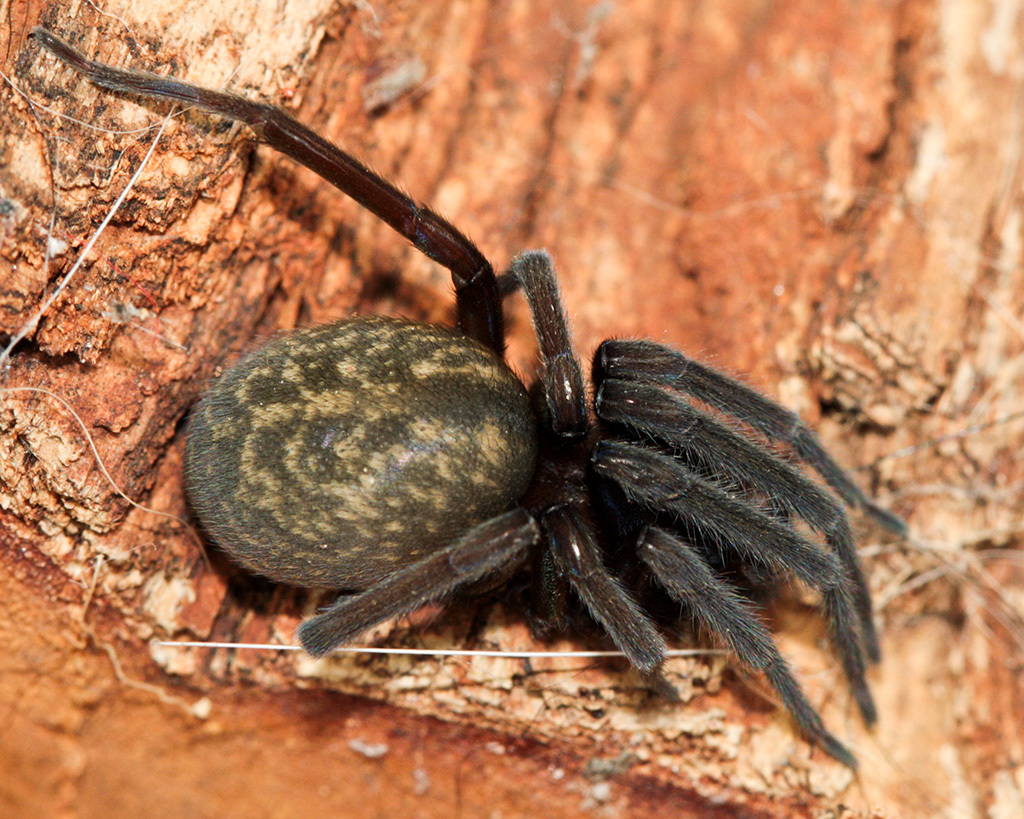

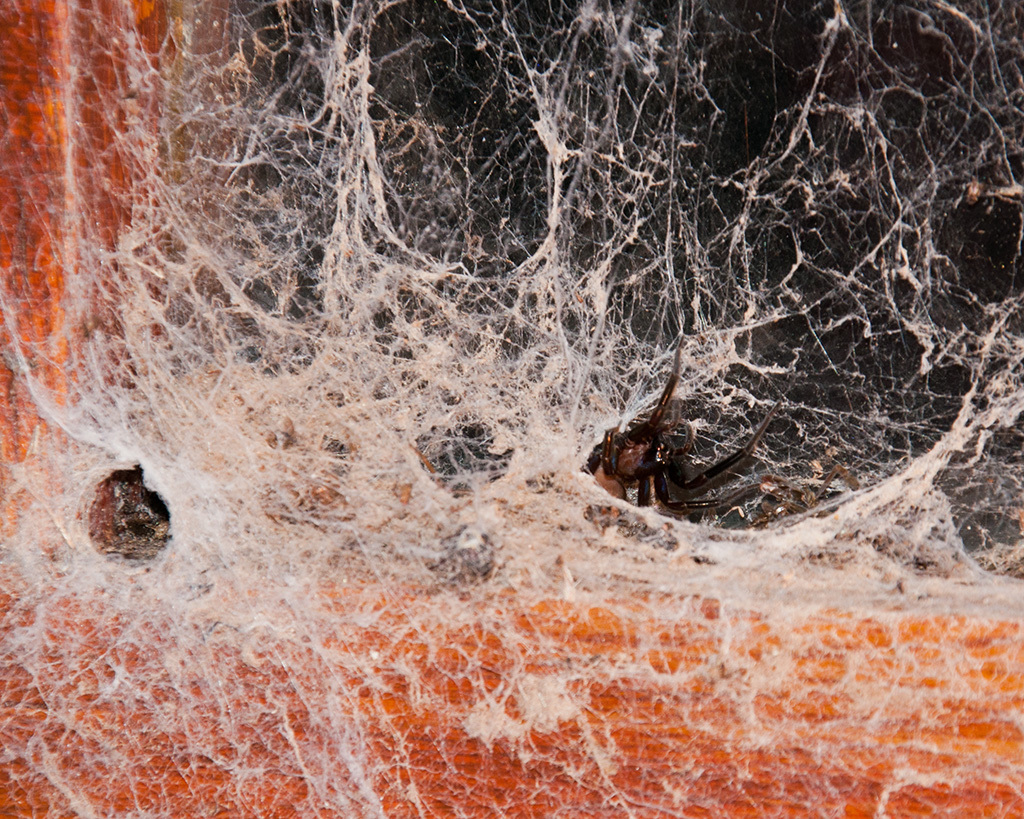

== Conservation ==
Vidole capensis is listed as Least Concern by the South African National Biodiversity Institute. The species is commonly found in three provinces and is well protected in more than 10 protected areas. Due to its wide geographical range, there are no significant threats to the species.

== Taxonomy ==
The species was originally described by Reginald Innes Pocock in 1900 as Auximus capensis from Bredasdorp in the Western Cape. It was later transferred to the genus Vidole by Pekka Lehtinen in 1967 and revised by Griswold in 1990, who synonymized several species with V. capensis. Vidole capensis serves as the type species for the genus Vidole and is known from both sexes.
