= Vidole lyra =

Lyra Vidole Hackled Band Spider

Conservation status
- Least Concern (SANBI Red List)

Scientific classification
- Kingdom: Animalia
- Phylum: Arthropoda
- Subphylum: Chelicerata
- Class: Arachnida
- Order: Araneae
- Infraorder: Araneomorphae
- Family: Phyxelididae
- Genus: Vidole
- Species: V. lyra

Binomial name
- Vidole lyra Griswold, 1990

Species of spider

Vidole lyra is a species of spider in the family Phyxelididae. It is endemic to South Africa and is commonly known as the lyra Vidole hackled band spider.

== Distribution ==
Vidole lyra is distributed across two South African provinces, Eastern Cape and Gauteng. The species occurs at altitudes ranging from 16 to 1,522 m above sea level.

== Habitat and ecology ==
This species inhabits the Grassland, Savanna, Thicket, and Indian Ocean Coastal Belt biomes. Vidole lyra is a ground retreat-web cryptic spider that lives in damp and dark places.

== Conservation ==
Vidole lyra is listed as Least Concern by the South African National Biodiversity Institute. Although known from only one sex, the species has a wide geographical range and is protected in Kloofendal Nature Reserve and Suikerbosrand Nature Reserve in Gauteng. There are no significant threats to the species.

== Taxonomy ==
The species was described by Griswold in 1990 from Lusikisiki in the Eastern Cape. Vidole lyra is known only from the female.
