= Cana I =

Coordinates: 7°10′01″N 2°04′01″E

- Arrondissement
- Interactive map of Cana I
- Country: Benin
- Department: Zou Department
- Commune: Zogbodomey

Population (2002)
  - Total: 4,648
- Time zone: UTC+1 (WAT)

Cana I is an arrondissement in the Zou department of Benin. It is an administrative division under the jurisdiction of the commune of Zogbodomey. According to the population census conducted by the Institut National de la Statistique Benin on February 15, 2002, the arrondissement had a total population of 4,648.
