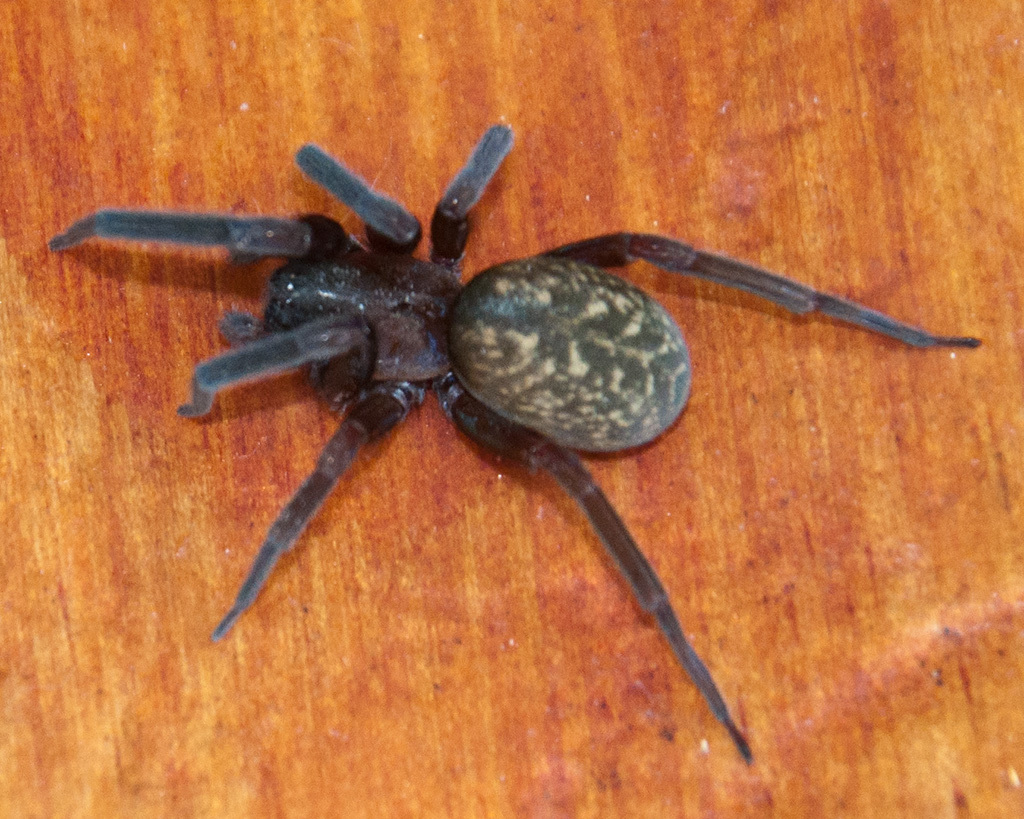
- Vidole capensis
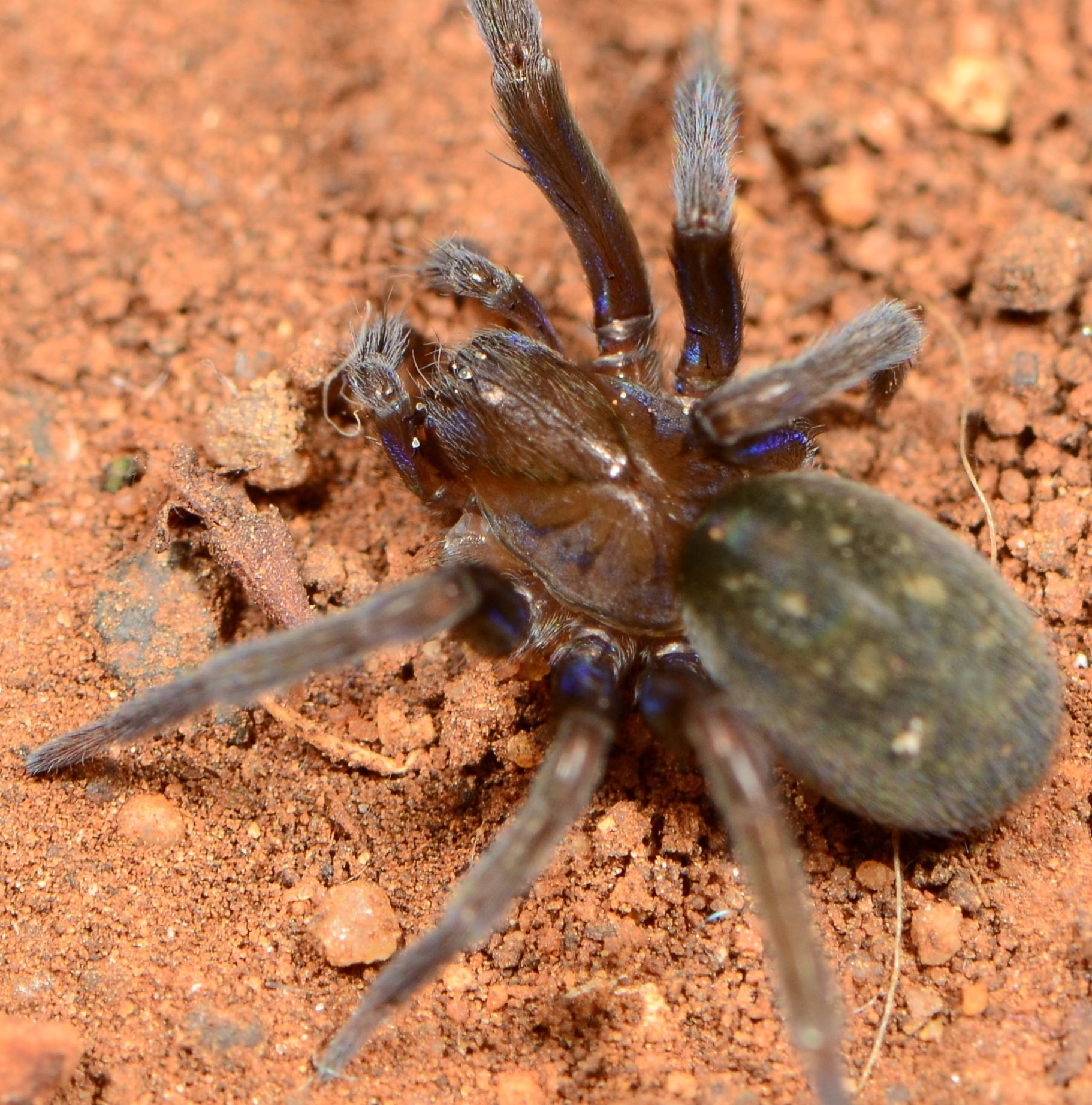

Scientific classification
- Kingdom: Animalia
- Phylum: Arthropoda
- Subphylum: Chelicerata
- Class: Arachnida
- Order: Araneae
- Infraorder: Araneomorphae
- Family: Phyxelididae
- Genus: Vidole; Lehtinen, 1967

Type species
- V. capensis (Pocock, 1900)

Species
- 5, see text

= Vidole (spider) =

Genus of spiders

Vidole is a genus of African araneomorph spiders in the family Phyxelididae, and was first described by Pekka T. Lehtinen in 1967.

== Description ==
Vidole are spiders with total lengths ranging from 5.25 to 14.5 mm. The body is densely setose. The carapace has a fovea that is long, deep, and narrowed posteriorly. The anterior eye row is slightly recurved while the posterior eye row is straight.

Male chelicerae have weak ventrolateral wrinkles, while female chelicerae are smooth to weakly wrinkled. The promargin of the fang furrow has 5-6 teeth, and the retromargin has 5-8 teeth. The sternum is long and narrowed. The abdominal dorsum has variable markings, while the venter displays paired narrow longitudinal bands.

The legs are long, generally unmodified, and uniformly marked, with leg formula 1423. The venters of the tarsi are densely setose. The origin of the calamistrum is at 0.31-0.40 from the base of metatarsus IV.

== Species ==
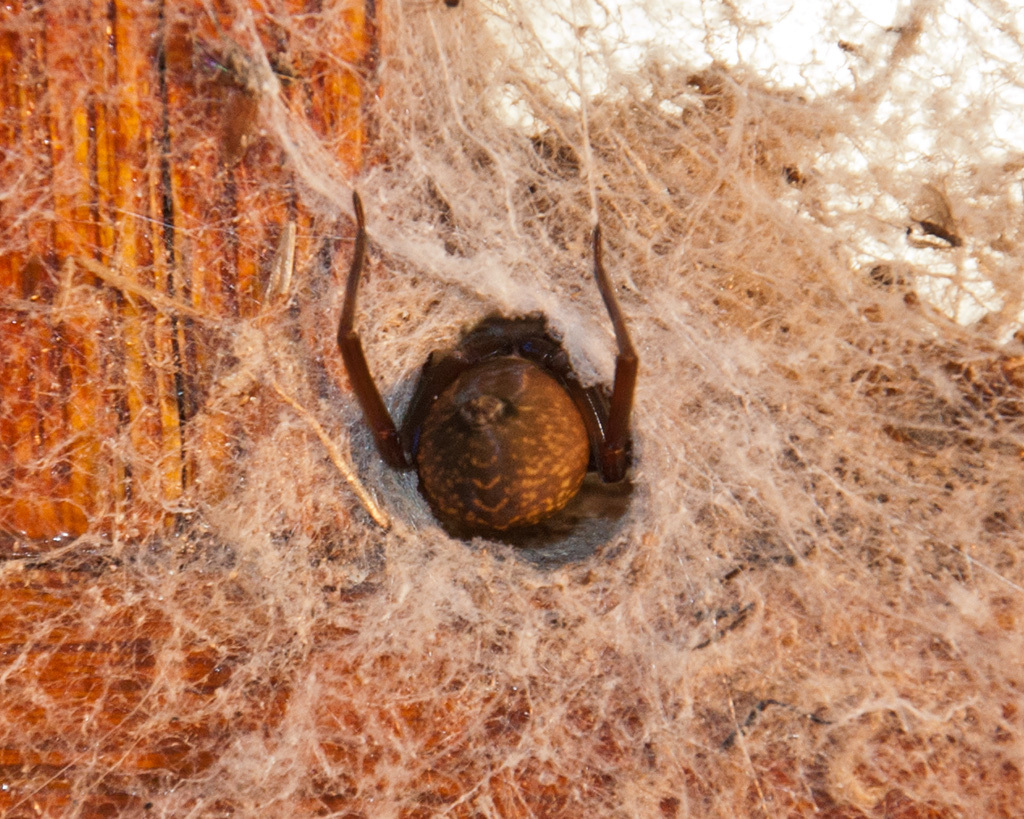
V. capensis in its tube

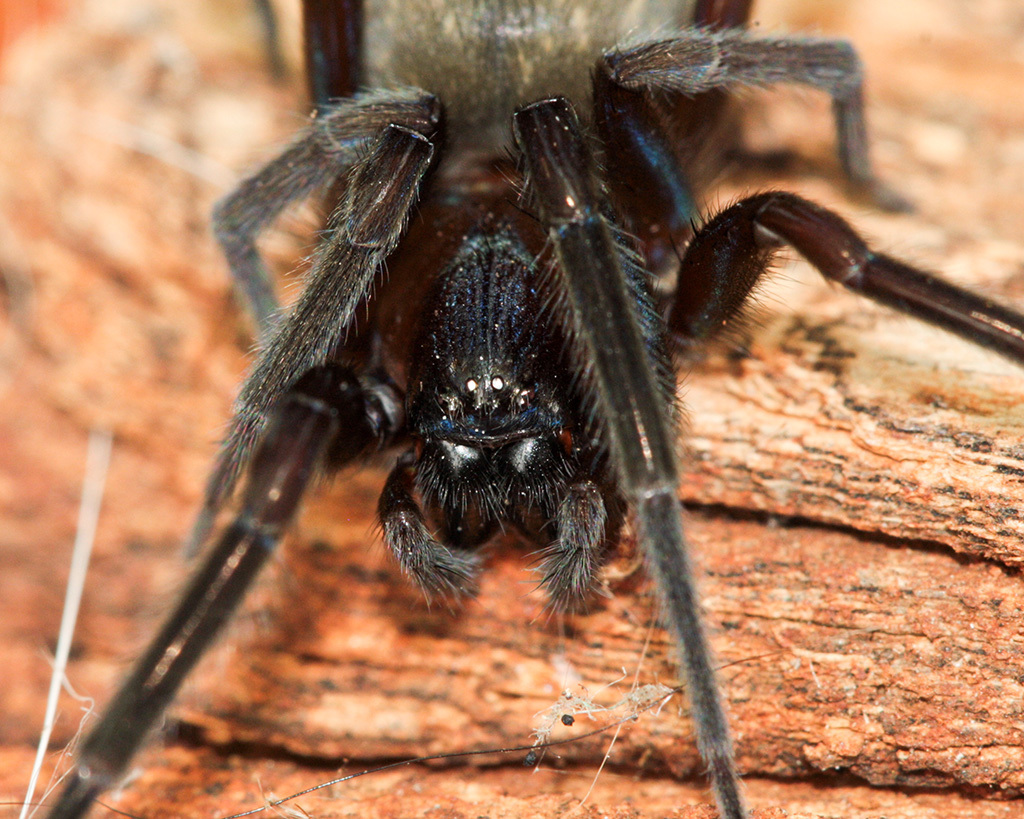
V. capensis

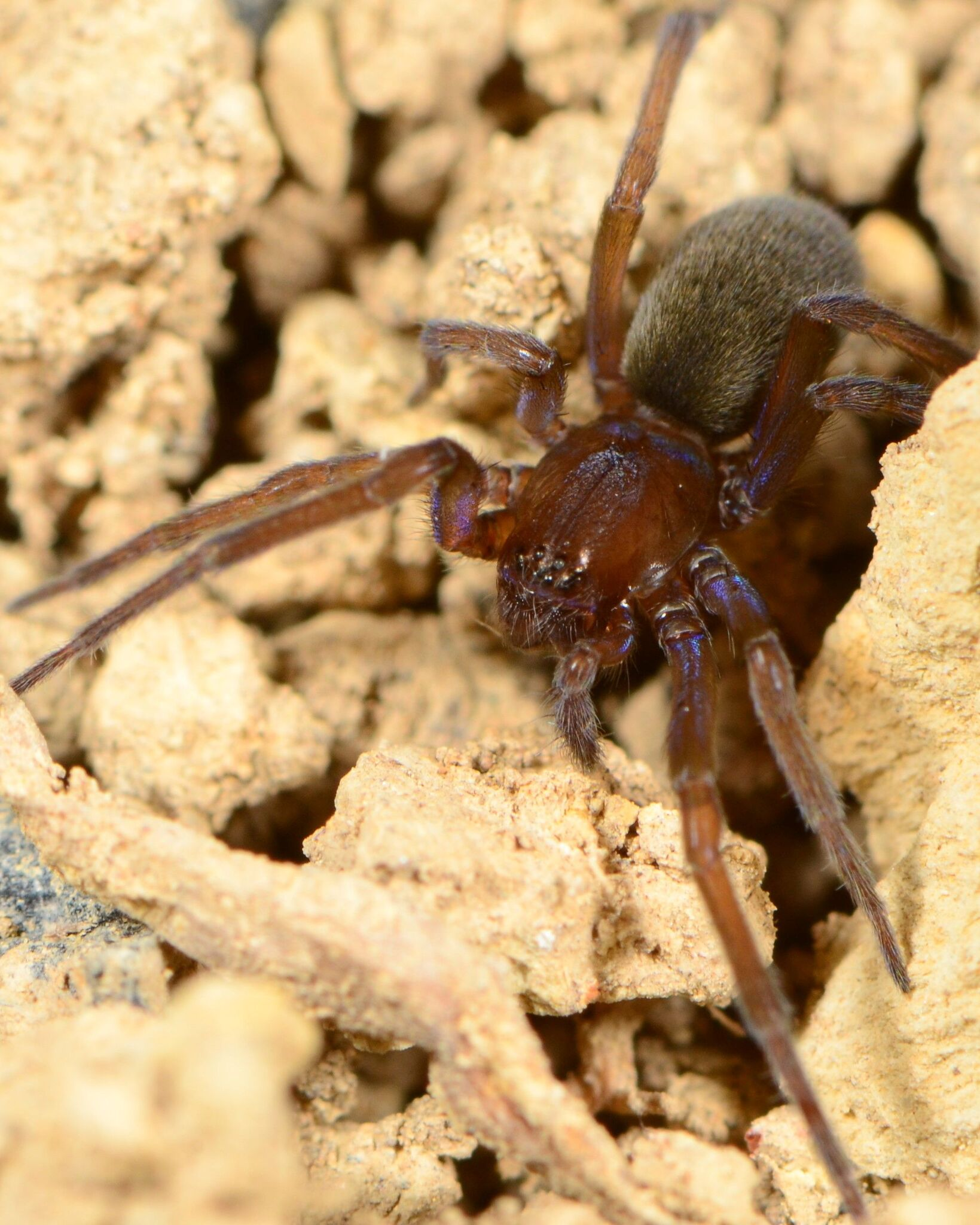
V. helicigyna

As of September 2025 it contains five species, found only in Lesotho and South Africa:

- Vidole capensis (Pocock, 1900) (type) – South Africa
- Vidole helicigyna Griswold, 1990 – South Africa
- Vidole lyra Griswold, 1990 – South Africa
- Vidole schreineri (Purcell, 1904) – South Africa
- Vidole sothoana Griswold, 1990 – Lesotho, South Africa
