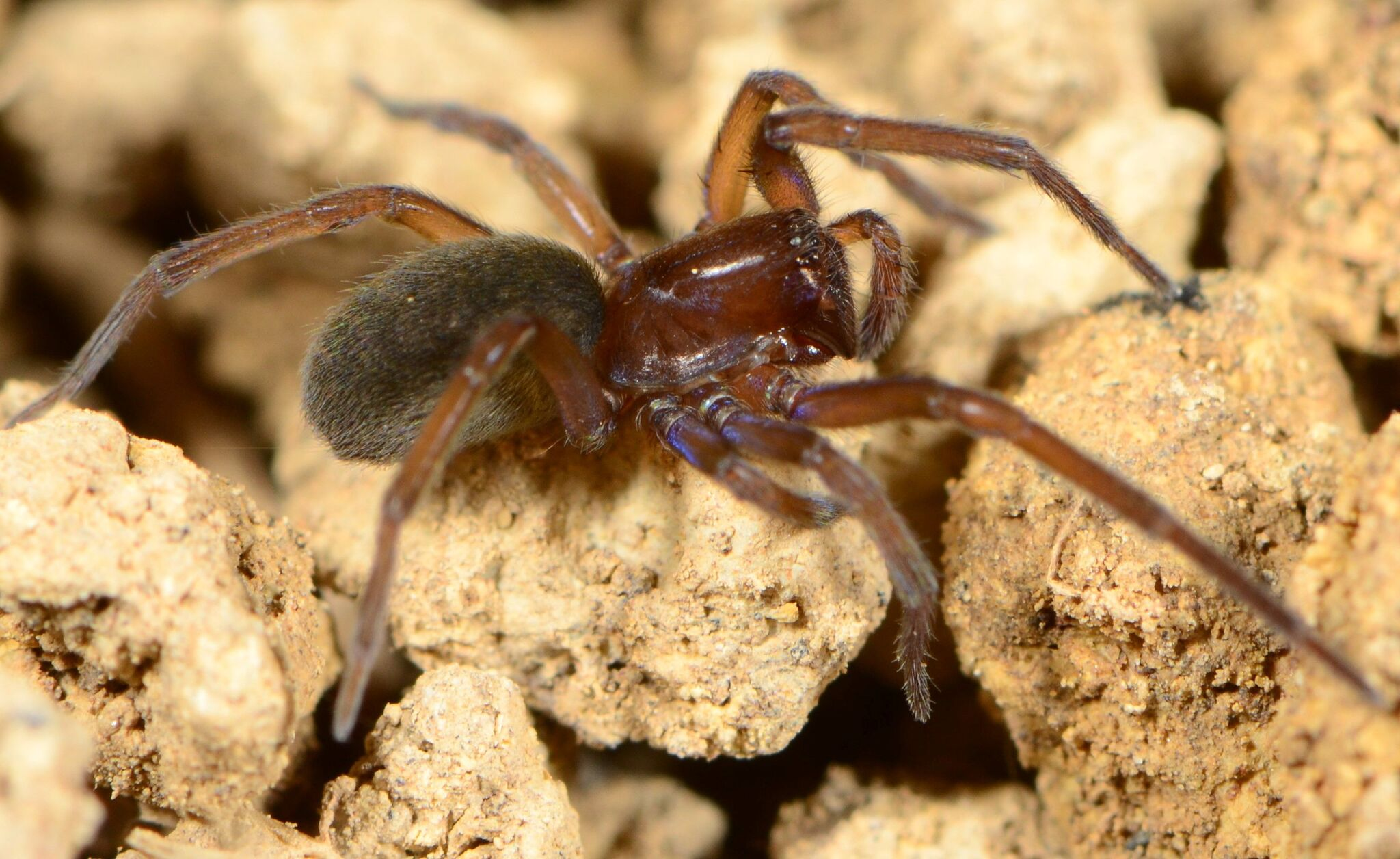

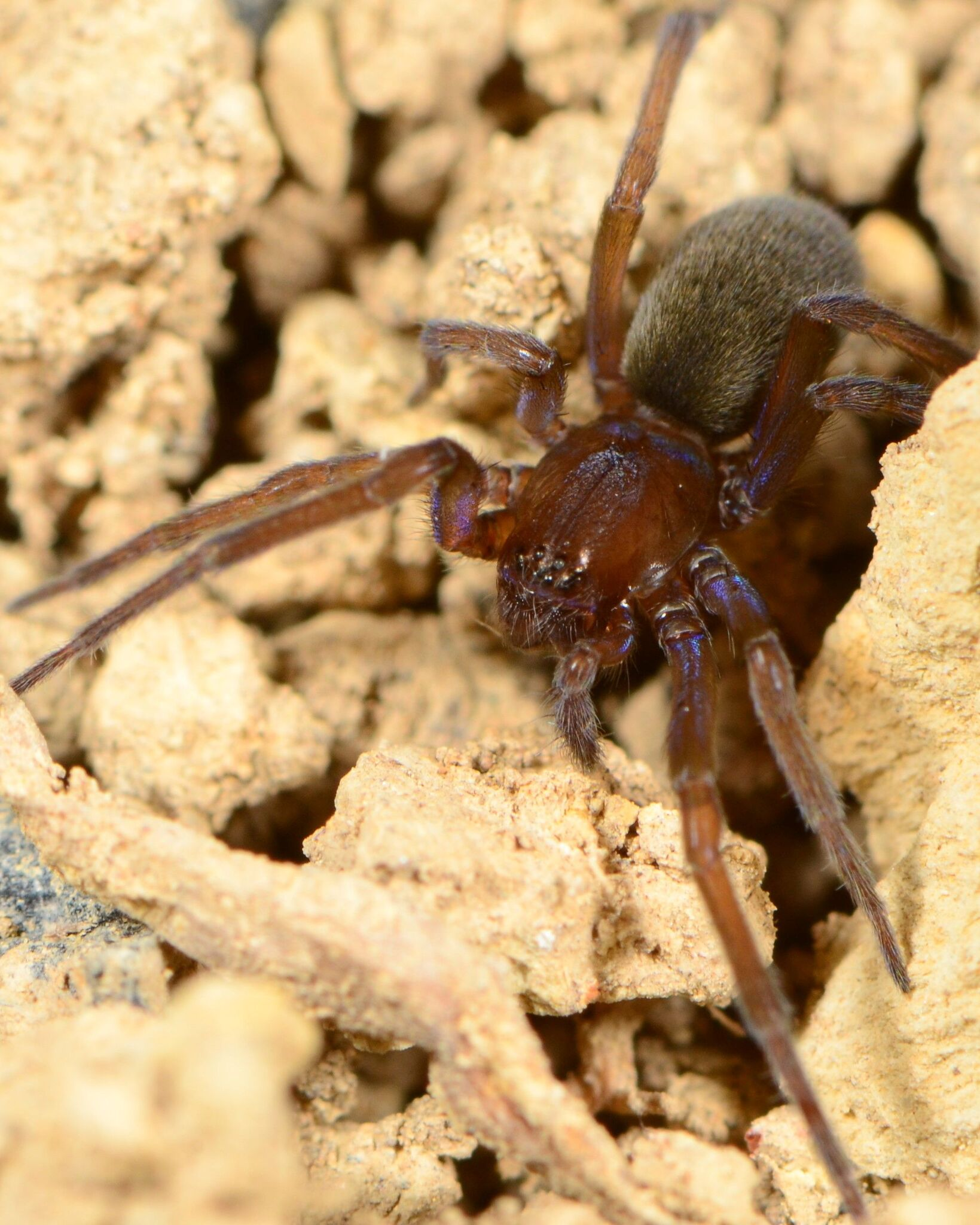

Scientific classification
- Kingdom: Animalia
- Phylum: Arthropoda
- Subphylum: Chelicerata
- Class: Arachnida
- Order: Araneae
- Infraorder: Araneomorphae
- Family: Phyxelididae
- Genus: Vidole
- Species: V. helicigyna

Binomial name
- Vidole helicigyna Griswold, 1990

= Vidole helicigyna =

Pietermaritzburg Vidole Hackled Band Spider

Species of spider

Vidole helicigyna is a species of spider in the family Phyxelididae. It is endemic to KwaZulu-Natal, South Africa, and is commonly known as the Pietermaritzburg Vidole hackled band spider.

== Distribution ==
Vidole helicigyna is known from several localities in KwaZulu-Natal, including the protected Kamberg Nature Reserve. The species occurs at altitudes ranging from 522 to 1,998 m above sea level.

== Habitat and ecology ==
This species inhabits the Grassland and Savanna biomes. Vidole helicigyna is a ground retreat-web cryptic spider that lives in dark places.

== Conservation ==
Vidole helicigyna is listed as Vulnerable under criterion B1ab(ii,iii)+2ab(ii,iii) by the South African National Biodiversity Institute. The area occupied by this species is experiencing ongoing loss of habitat due to urban development, crop cultivation and afforestation. There has been extensive transformation of habitat within the KwaZulu-Natal Midlands, with habitat loss due to agroforestry plantations, crop cultivation and urban development.

== Taxonomy ==
The species was described by Griswold in 1990 from Pietermaritzburg. Vidole helicigyna is known from both sexes.
