= Luc Atrokpo =

Beninese Politician

Luc Setondji Atrokpo
- Luc Sètondji Atrokpo
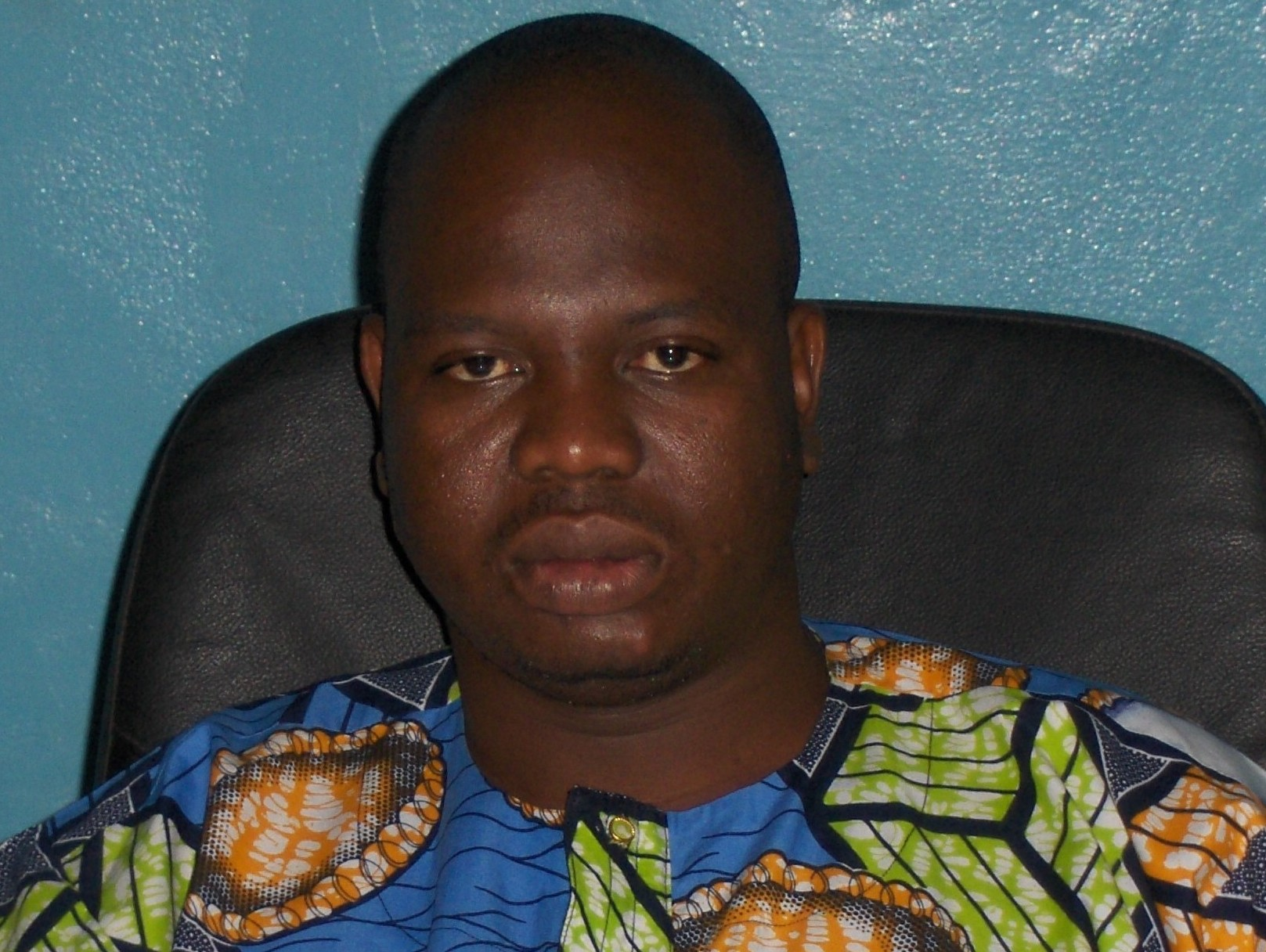
- Born: 1972 (age 53–54); Bohicon
- Citizenship: Benin
- Occupation: Politician
- Years active: 2003- Present
- Title: Mayor of Cotonou
- Term: 5 years
- Predecessor: Isidore Gnonlonfoun
- Political party: Progressive Union Renewal

Luc Atrokpo is a Beninese Politician and Lawyer. He served as the mayor of Bohicon between 2008 and 2020 and has currently served as the mayor of Cotonou since June 2020.

== Biography ==
Luc Atrokpo was born in 1972 in Bohicon, Benin. His political career began in 2003 when he served as deputy mayor of the city of Bohicon. He served as mayor of Bohicon between 2008 and 2020. In 2015, he succeeded Soulé Alagbe as president of the National Association of Benin Municipalities (ANCB). In 2018 he was elected as First Vice President of the West African Economic and Monetary Union. On June 6, 2020, he was elected as mayor of Cotonou, the largest city in Benin, succeeding Isidore Gnonlonfoun.
