= Abraham Zinzindohoue =

Beninese lawyer and politician

Abraham Zinzindohoue (born 1948 in Bohicon) is a Beninese lawyer and politician. He was the Minister of Justice of Benin from April 2006 to 2007.

He was President of the Supreme Court of Benin and Senior Vice-President of the Supreme Council of the Judiciary in 2005.
