= Zoukou, Djidja =

Coordinates: 7.3899°N 1.9367°E

Zoukou
- Arrondissement
- Interactive map of Zoukou
- Country: Benin
- Department: Zou Department
- Commune: Dijida

Population (2002)
  - Total: 2,873
- Time zone: UTC+1 (WAT)

Zoukou is an arrondissement in the Zou department of Benin. It is also an administrative division under the jurisdiction of the commune of Dijida. According to the population census conducted by the Institut National de la Statistique Benin on February 15, 2002, the arrondissement had a total population of 2,873.
