= Djidja =

- Commune and city
- Location in Benin
- Coordinates: 7°20′N 1°56′E
- Country: Benin
- Department: Zou Department

Area
  - Total: 843 sq mi (2,184 km^{2})

Population (2013)
  - Total: 123,542
  - Density: 100/sq mi (39/km^{2})
- Time zone: UTC+1 (WAT)

Djidja [dʒi.dʒa] is a town, arrondissement, and commune in the Zou Department of south-western Benin. The commune covers an area of 2184 square kilometres and as of 2013 had a population of 123,542 people.

== Geography ==
Djidja (Djomla) is located 24 kilometres northeast of Abomey and 163 kilometres from Cotonou. It is bounded to the southwest by Couffo, east by the communes of Za-Kpota and Cove and the north by Collines. A main road passes from south to north, but it is hardly passable during the rainy season forcing all users to comply with an average speed of safety of about 40 km / hour (about 25 minutes travel from Abomey).

Djidja is cosmopolitan and has a population of 84,590 inhabitants spread over an area of 2184km ².

== Administrative divisions ==
Djidja is subdivided into 12 arrondissements; Djidja, Agondji, Agouna, Dan, Dohouimè, Gobé, Oungbègamè, Monsourou, Mougnon, Outo, Setto, Zoukou. They contain 64 villages and 11 city districts.

== Economy ==
90% of the population are engaged in agricultural activities followed by trade, transportation and handicrafts. 147 300,00 hectares of land are devoted to agriculture, accounting for 38.76% of the total population. The main crops grown are maize, cotton, cowpeas, peanuts, yams and cassava.
