= Bohicon =

Bohicon Gbɔ̀xikɔn
- Commune and city
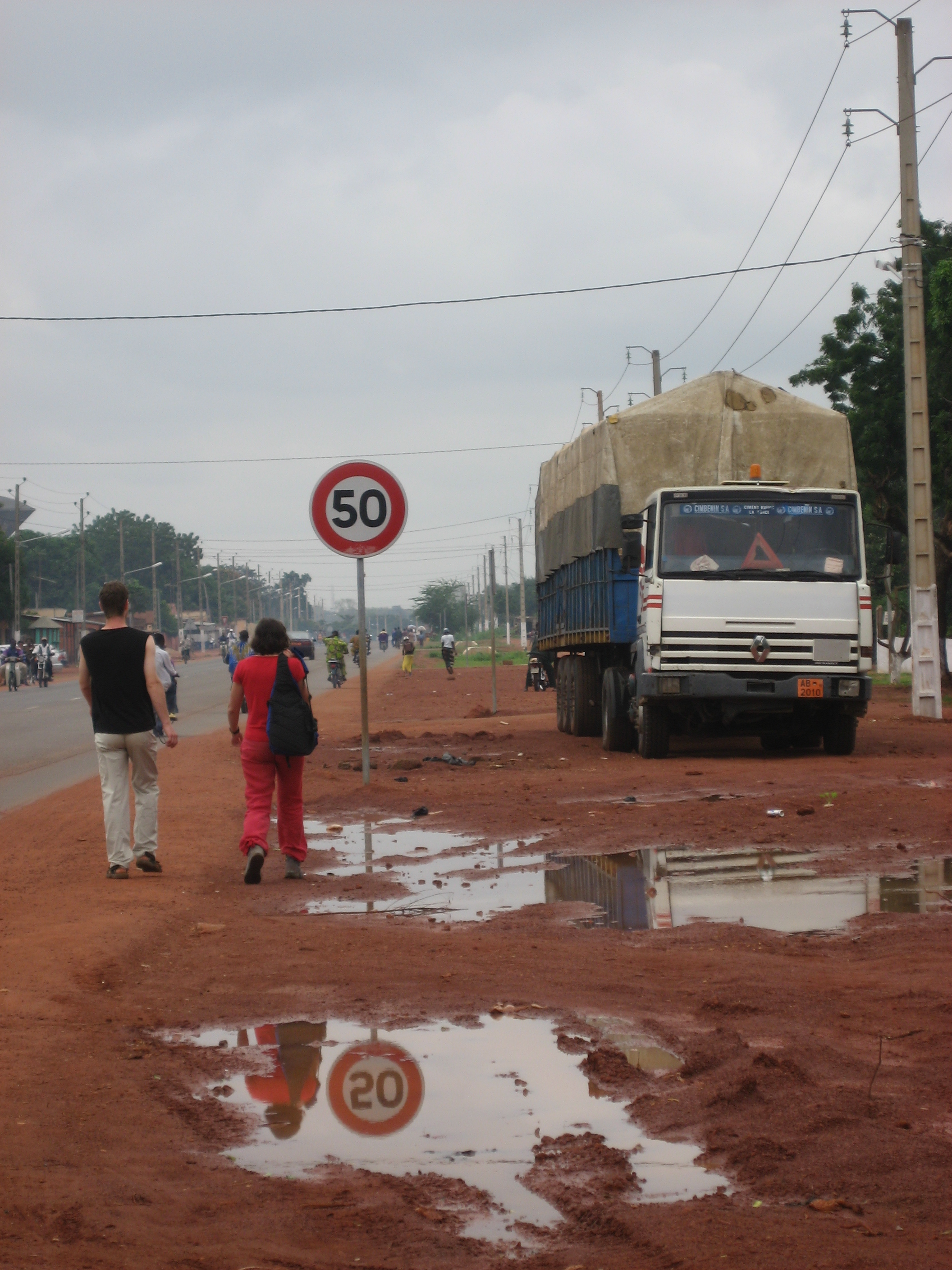
- Road leading into Bohicon from the south

- Location in Benin
- Coordinates: 7°12′N 2°04′E
- Country: Benin
- Department: Zou Department

Area
  - Total: 44 km^{2} (17 sq mi)
- Elevation: 167 m (548 ft)

Population (2012)
  - Total: 149,271
  - Density: 3,400/km^{2} (8,800/sq mi)
- Time zone: UTC+1 (WAT)

Bohicon [bɔ.i.kɔ̃] or Gbɔ̀xikɔn [gbɔ.i.kɔ̃] is a city in Benin, and a conurbation of Abomey lying 9 kilometres east on the railway line from Cotonou to Parakou, and on Benin's main highway RNIE 2 which joins the RNIE 4. The commune covers an area of 139 square kilometres and as of 2012 had a population of 149,271 people.

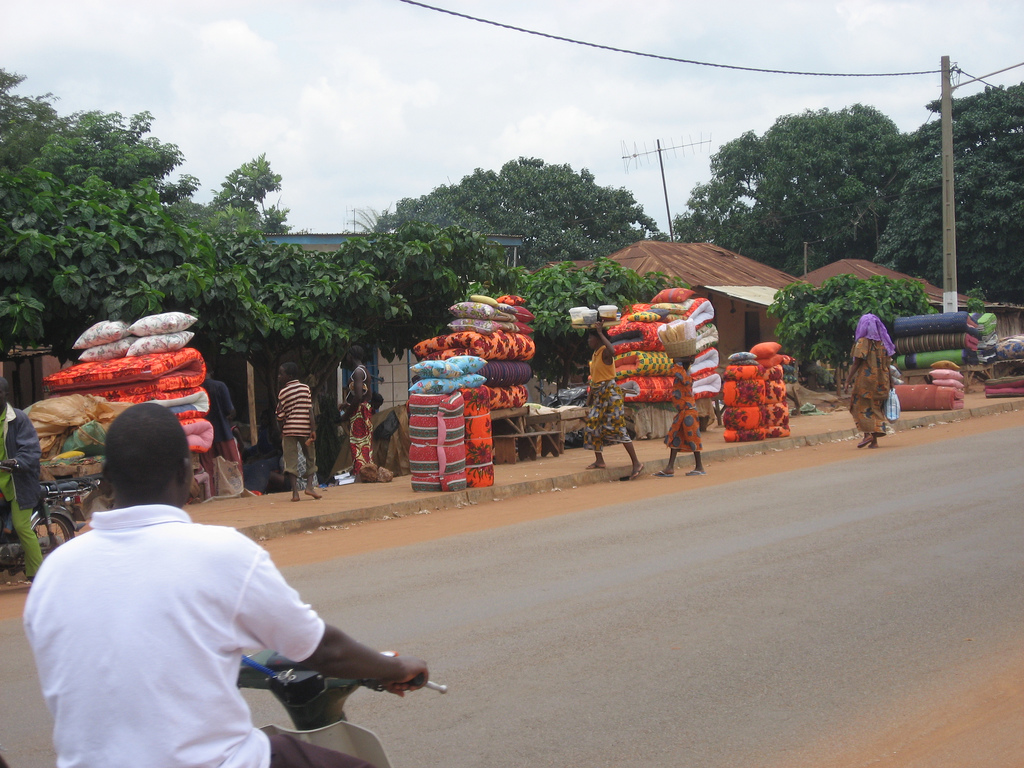
Bohicon traders of textiles, such as cushions and mattresses

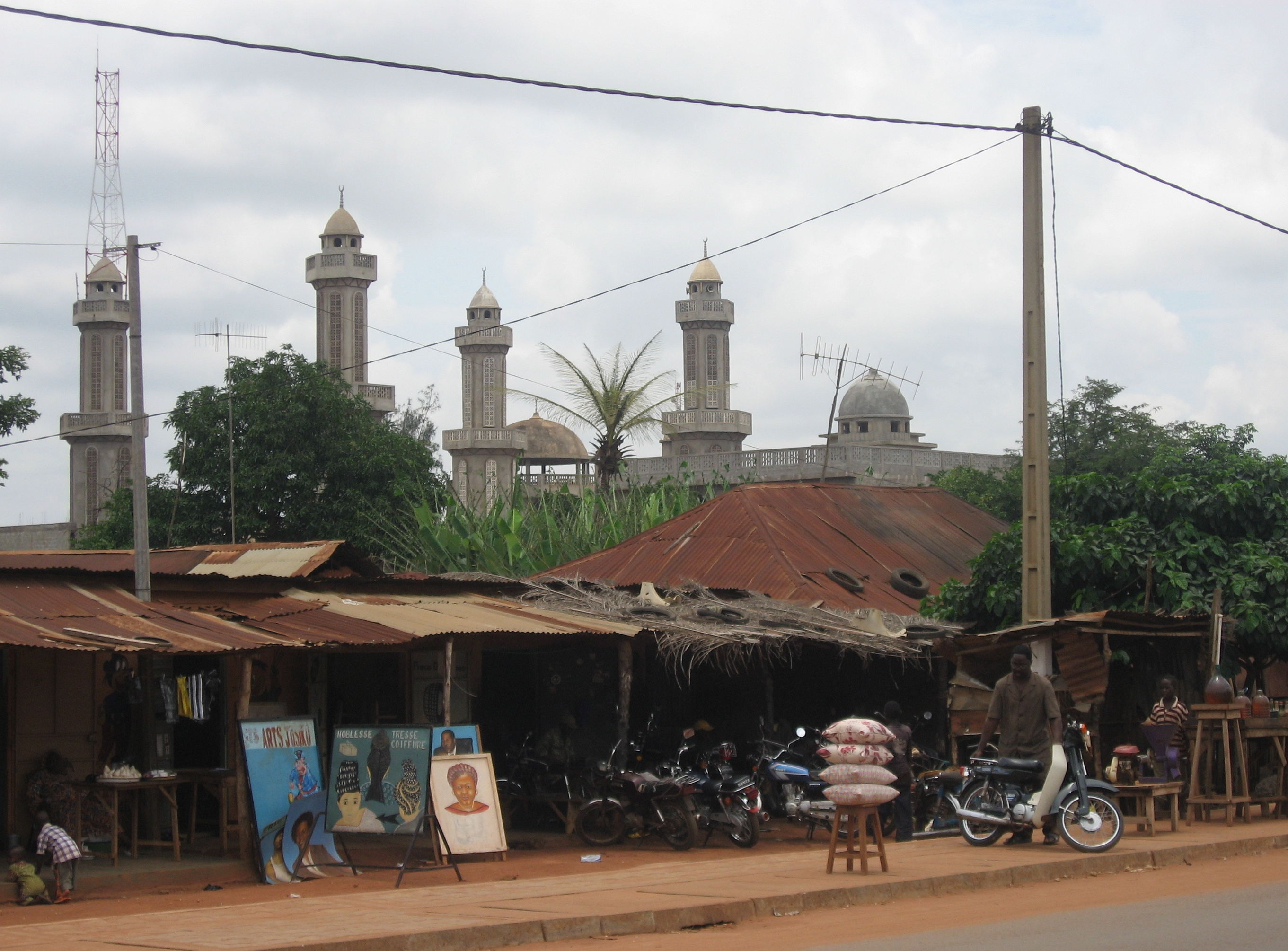
Mosque and Mission Jama'at Islamic Ahmadiyya in Bohicon

A specialty sold in the market is afitin, which is traditionally made by women in the region. It is a protein-rich fermented food widely used in West Africa as a seasoning.

== Climate ==
Bohicon has a rather dry tropical savanna climate (Köppen Aw) with a lengthy though moderate wet season from March to October and a short dry season from November to February. The wet season divides into two periods: a hotter first half from March to June and a cooler, foggy second half somewhat influenced by the northern extension of the Benguela Current.

Climate data for Bohicon (1991–2020)
Month	Jan	Feb	Mar	Apr	May	Jun	Jul	Aug	Sep	Oct	Nov	Dec	Year
Mean daily maximum °C (°F)	35.0 (95.0)	36.4 (97.5)	35.6 (96.1)	34.3 (93.7)	32.9 (91.2)	31.3 (88.3)	29.9 (85.8)	29.4 (84.9)	30.6 (87.1)	32.0 (89.6)	34.1 (93.4)	34.8 (94.6)	33.0 (91.4)
Daily mean °C (°F)	29.0 (84.2)	30.5 (86.9)	30.2 (86.4)	29.4 (84.9)	28.4 (83.1)	27.3 (81.1)	26.3 (79.3)	25.8 (78.4)	26.6 (79.9)	27.5 (81.5)	28.9 (84.0)	29.1 (84.4)	28.2 (82.8)
Mean daily minimum °C (°F)	23.1 (73.6)	24.5 (76.1)	24.8 (76.6)	24.5 (76.1)	24.0 (75.2)	23.2 (73.8)	22.6 (72.7)	22.2 (72.0)	22.6 (72.7)	23.0 (73.4)	23.8 (74.8)	23.4 (74.1)	23.5 (74.3)
Average precipitation mm (inches)	7.9 (0.31)	34.4 (1.35)	80.3 (3.16)	118.8 (4.68)	138.4 (5.45)	153.1 (6.03)	160.8 (6.33)	102.0 (4.02)	161.8 (6.37)	126.3 (4.97)	29.7 (1.17)	9.6 (0.38)	1,123 (44.21)
Average precipitation days (≥ 1.0 mm)	1	3	6	9	11	12	11	10	14	12	3	1	93
Average relative humidity (%)	61.8	64.8	70.3	75.1	78.6	80.7	82.2	82.3	81.3	79.3	73.1	67.2	74.7
Mean monthly sunshine hours	192.0	191.0	206.8	204.6	208.3	160.7	124.5	99.3	128.9	199.1	237.3	226.9	2,179.4
Source: NOAA

== Administration ==
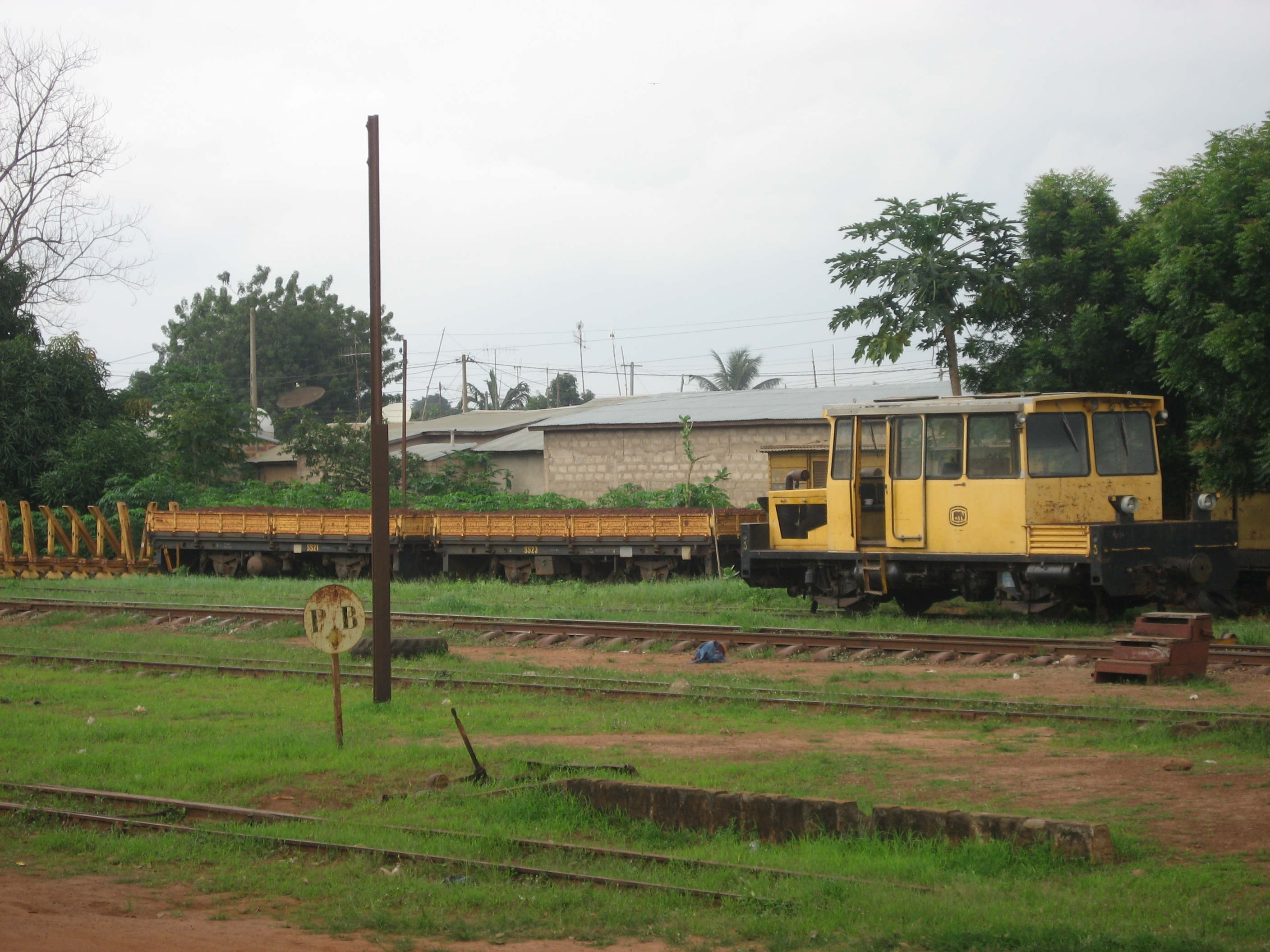
Bohicon Railway Station

Bohicon is one of the 77 official Communes of Benin. The city is located 9 kilometres from Abomey but the commune is divided into arrondissements:

- Bohicon 1
- Bohicon 2
- Sdohomé
- Saclo
- Passangon
- Ouassaho
- Lissezoun
- Gnidjazoun
- Avogbana
- Agongointo

== Notable landmarks ==
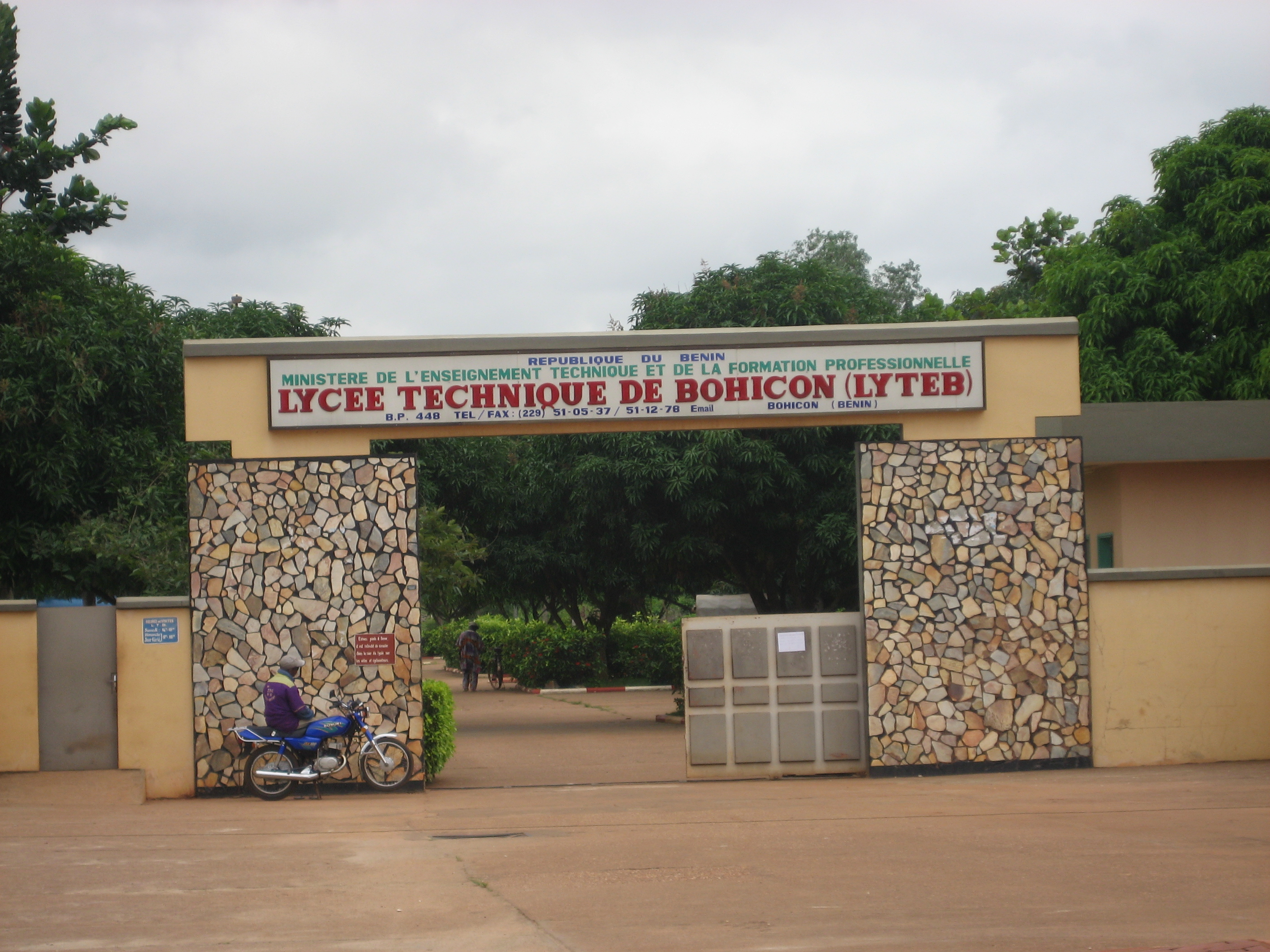
Lycée Technique de Bohicon

- Lycée Technique de Bohicon (LYTEB)
- Collège Monseigneur Steinmetz
- Bohicon Railway Station
- Parc Archeologique d'Agongointo

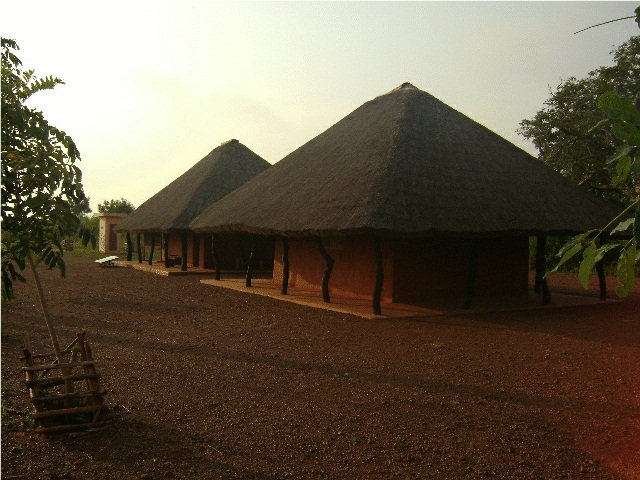
Entrance to the Parc Archéologique d'Agongointo

== Notable people ==
- Nicéphore Dieu-Donné Soglo - former President of Benin
- Hubert Maga - Born in Parakou but studied in Bohicon.
- Abraham Zinzindohoue - former Benin Minister of Justice
- Ben La Desh - Musician from Rotterdam but born in Bohicon.
- Jonas Lekpa - Famous marabout living in Bohicon.
- Luc Atrokpo - Politician currently serving as mayor of Cotonou.
