= Za-Kpota =

- Commune and city
- Location in Benin
- Coordinates: 7°13′49″N 2°12′55″E
- Country: Benin
- Department: Zou Department

Area
  - Total: 230 sq mi (600 km^{2})

Population (2013)
  - Total: 132,818
  - Density: 570/sq mi (220/km^{2})
- Time zone: UTC+1 (WAT)

Za-Kpota or Zakpota (both pronounced [za.kpɔ.ta]) is a town, arrondissement, and commune in the Zou Department of south-western Benin. It is located 153 kilometres north of Cotonou and 33 kilometres east of Abomey (Bohicon is even closer).

== History ==
Za-Kpota dates back to 1645, when Fon settlers from Abomey and Bohicon settled there in order to develop farming and hunting. The first settlement was Adikogon. The name is derived from settlers who remarked "Za kpo O ta bo not Finin" which roughly means: "Sweep the rise and reside there."

Za-Kpota covers an area of 600 square kilometres and had 132,818 inhabitants with a Density of 570 inhabitants per km in 2002. The commune contains some 56 villages, mostly engaged in subsistence farming. Originally populated by Fons, the town now houses some Mahis, Yoruba and Dendi.

== Economy ==
Economic activities that occupy people include agriculture (85%), trade (8%), crafts (5%) and other services (2%). However, the commune is living in poverty.

Zakpota has a school with around 250 pupils, 80% of which are boys. Donations from the Netherlands have been geared towards improving female education in the commune.

Za-Kpota was struck hard by the 2008 Benin floods in July 2008, tearing down mud and straw homes and infrastructure and polluting rivers. .

== Child trafficking ==
In December 2003, Za-Kpota was the centre of a serious child trafficking scandal. It erupted after rival traffickers gave the Nigerian police pictures of children from Za-Kpota working arduously in quarries and farms in Nigeria, authorised by their parents due to extreme poverty. The police located 261 boys, aged 6–16 in Abeokuta in Ogun State and sent them back to Benin on trucks. Seven traffickers were arrested and incarcerated. The boys at the centre of the Za-Kpota Nigerian trafficking scandal were believed to represent only a small percentage of the total number of some 50,000 Beninese children which are believed to be a victim of cross-border child trafficking. In cooperation with the United Nations Children's Fund (UNICEF), the government has set up village committees to stop child trafficking.
