= Zogbodomey =

Town, arrondissement, and commune in Zou Department, Benin

- Commune and city
- Location in Benin
- Coordinates: 7°5′N 2°6′E
- Country: Benin
- Department: Zou Department

Area
  - Total: 230 sq mi (600 km^{2})

Population (2002)
  - Total: 72,338
- Time zone: UTC+1 (WAT)

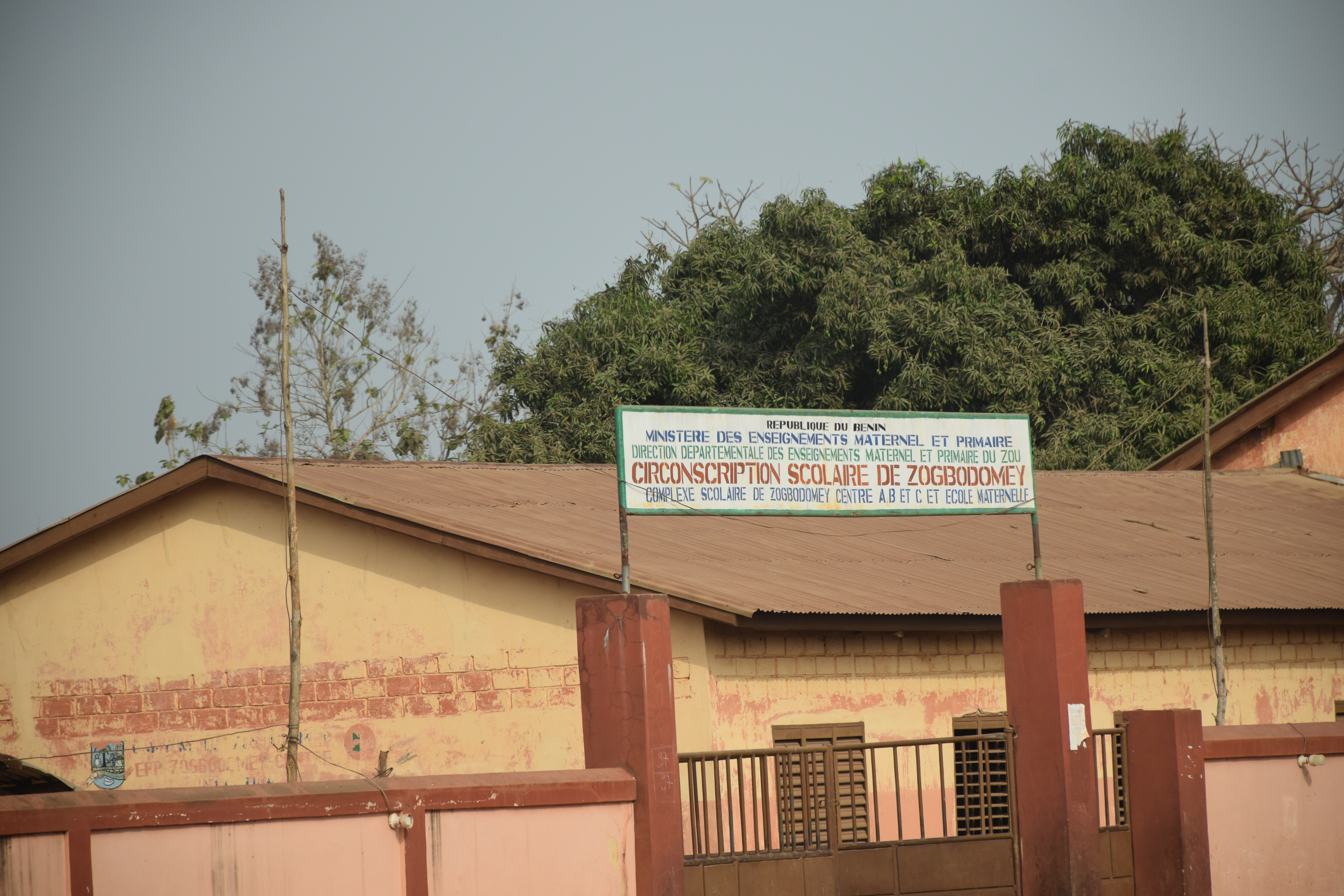
School in Zogbodemy

Zogbodomey or Zogbodomè (both pronounced [zɔ.gbɔ.dɔ.mɛ]) is a town, arrondissement, and commune in the Zou Department of south-western Benin. The commune covers an area of 600 square kilometres and as of 2002 had a population of 72,338 people.

== Administrative divisions ==
Zogbodomey is divided administratively into 11 arrondissements: Akiza, Avlamè, Cana I, Cana II, Domè, Koussoukpa, Kpokissa, Massi, Tanwé-Hessou, Zoukou and Zogbodomey. The commune contains 6 urban quarters and 59 villages.

== Economy ==
The economy of Zogbodomey is based on agriculture, livestock, trade and agro food processing.

Agriculture employs over 80% of the population, with the main crops grown being maize and groundnuts, but in recent years, producers are turning to other commodities such as vegetables, cotton, cassava, soybeans, cowpeas, and rice.

Livestock production is limited to goats, sheep, pigs, poultry and rabbits.

Small and medium enterprises operate in Zogbodomey and transform products such as cassava, palm oil, vegetable oil and soybean etc.

There are a variety of markets and traders in the main town, and bars and restaurants have grown up in recent years, and new shops and stores.

== Notable people ==
- Georges Nobime (1965-)
