= Zou Department =

Department of Benin

Zou
- Department
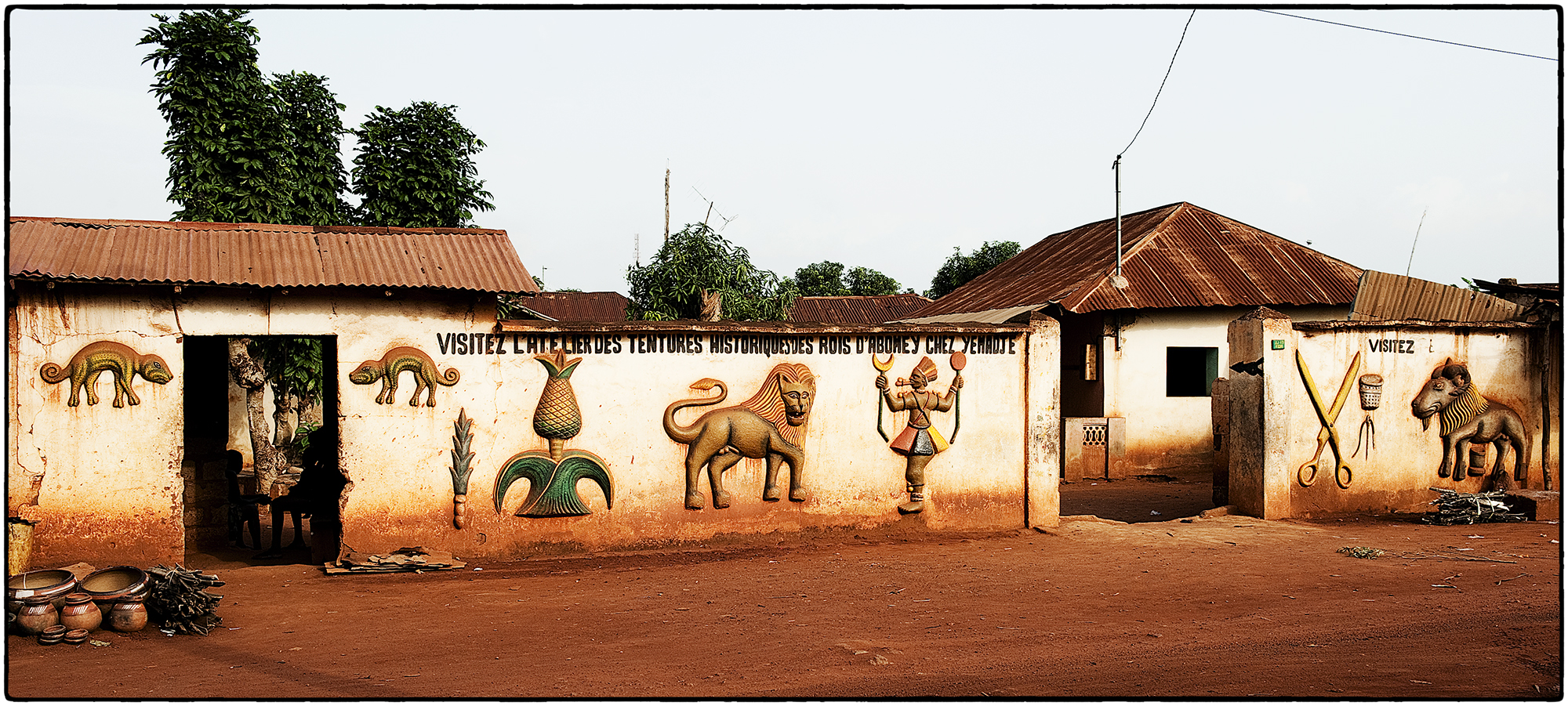
- Abomey royal palace wall

- Map highlighting the Zou Department
- Coordinates: 7°11′N 1°59′E
- Country: Benin
- Capital: Abomey

Area
  - Total: 5,243 km^{2} (2,024 sq mi)

Population (2013 census)
  - Total: 851,623
  - Density: 162.4/km^{2} (420.7/sq mi)
- Time zone: UTC+1 (WAT)

Zou [zu] is one of the twelve departments of Benin, named for the Zou River which travels through the department before emptying into the Atlantic in the south of the country. The department of Zou was split in two in 1999, with the northern territory transferred to the newly created Collines Department. The capital of Zou is Abomey. Zou is subdivided into nine communes, each centred at one of the principal towns: Abomey, Agbangnizoun, Bohicon, Cové, Djidja, Ouinhi, Za-Kpota, Zangnanado and Zogbodomey.

As of 2013, the total population of the department was 851,580, with 407,030 males and 444,550 females. The proportion of women was 52.20%. The total rural population was 67.00%, while the urban population was 33.00%. The total labour force in the department was 275,249, of which 50.10% were women. The proportion of households with no level of education was 60.70% and the proportion of households with children attending school was 72.90%.

== Geography ==
Zou Department borders Collines Department to the north, Plateau Department to the east, Ouémé Department and Atlantique Department to the south, Kouffo Department to the south-west, and Togo to the west. The department is characterised by plateaus, ranging from 20 to 200 m (66 to 656 ft) above the mean sea level, which are split by valleys running from north to south, created by the Zou River and Kauoffo River. The southern regions of Benin receive two spells of rain from March to July and September to November, while the northern regions of the country receive one season of rainfall from May to September. The country receives an average annual rainfall of around 1,200 mm (47 in).

=== Settlements ===
Abomey is the departmental capital; other major settlements include Bohicon, Cové, Za-Kpota and Zagnanado.

== Demographics ==
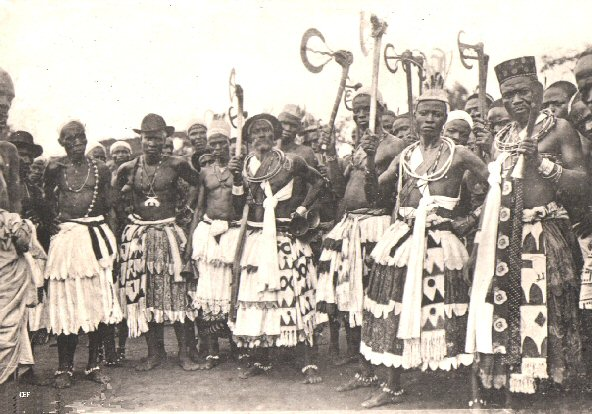
Celebration at Abomey

Religious census
Religion	Percent(%)
Catholic	26.6%
Vodoun	20.1%
Other Christian	16.5%
Celestial Church	10.8%
Other Protestant	5%
Muslim	3.5%
Methodist	3.1%
Other Traditional	1.9%
Other	4.6%

According to Benin's 2013 census, the total population of the department was 851,580, with 407,030 males and 444,550 females. The proportion of women was 52.20%. The total rural population was 67.00%, while the urban population was 33.00%. The proportion of women of childbearing age (15 to 49 years old) was 23.90%. The foreign population was 4,615, representing 0.50% of the total population in the department. The labour force participation rate among foreigners aged 15–64 years was 37.30%. The proportion of women among the foreign population constituted 49.60%. The number of households in the department was 178,698 and the average household size was 4.8. The intercensal growth rate of the population was 3.20%.

Among women, the average age at first marriage was 21 and the average age at maternity was 28.6. The synthetic index of fertility of women was 5.1. The average number of families in a house was 1.2 and the average number of persons per room was 1.9. The total labour force in the department was 275,249, of which 50.10% were women. The proportion of households with no level of education was 60.70% and the proportion of households with children attending school was 72.90%. The crude birth rate was 37.8, the general rate of fertility was 158.50 and the gross reproduction rate was 2.50.

The majority of the population are the Fon people, who comprise 91% of the population. Other groups include the Aja people make up 4%; Yoruba make up 3% of the population; Aguna, and Ede.

== Administrative divisions ==
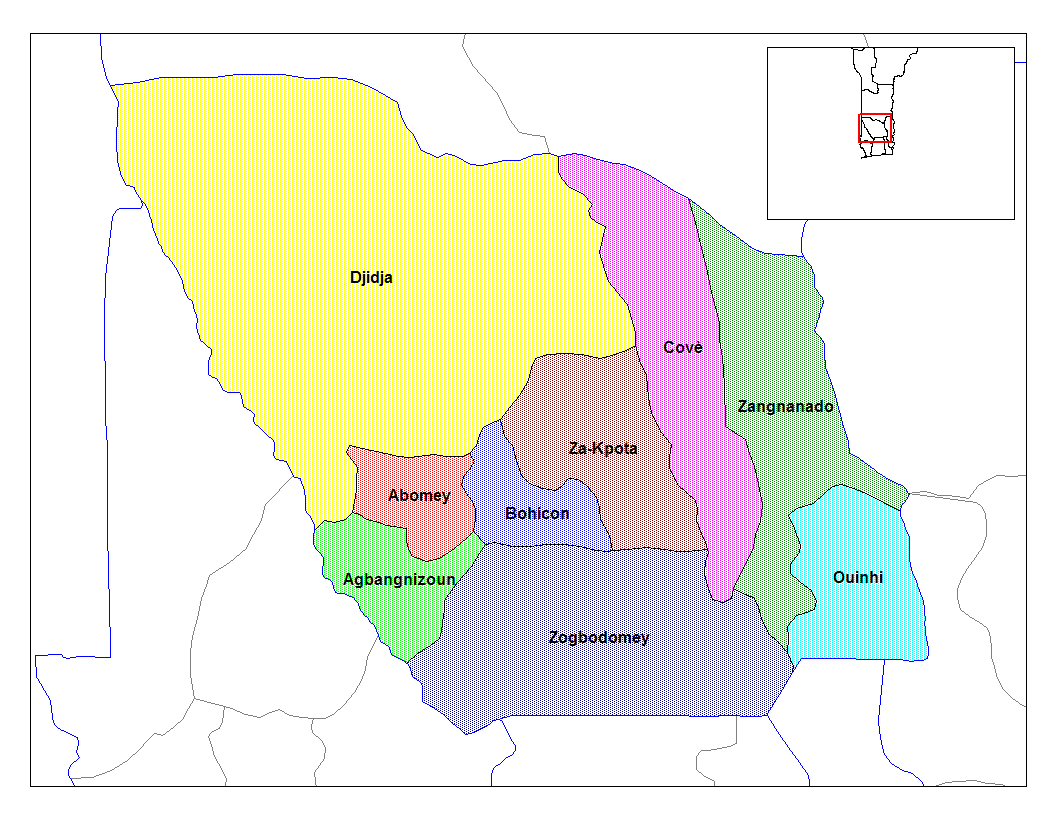
Communes of Zou

The department of Zou was split in 1999, with the northern territory moved to the newly created Collines Department. The capital of Zou is Abomey. It is subdivided into nine communes, each centered at one of the principal towns: Abomey, Agbangnizoun, Bohicon, Cové, Djidja, Ouinhi, Za-Kpota, Zangnanado and Zogbodomey.

Benin originally had six administrative regions (départements), which have now been bifurcated to make 12. Each of the deconcentrated administrative services (directions départementales) of the sectoral ministries takes care of two administrative regions. A law passed in 1999 transformed the sous-prefectures, the lowest level of territorial administration, into local governments. Municipalities and communal councils have elected representatives who manage the administration of the regions. The latest elections of the municipal and communal councils were held in May 2020.
