= Maleki =

Maleki (Persian: ملكي) may refer to:

== Places ==
- Malaki, Hormozgan
- Maleki, Khuzestan
- Maleki, Sistan and Baluchestan
- Maleki, South Khorasan

== Other uses ==
- Maleki (surname)
- Meleke, architectural term

== See also ==
- Maliki (disambiguation)
- Malikism (disambiguation)
- Milaki, Iran (disambiguation)
- Aliabad-e Maleki
- Sarab-e Maleki
- Shand-e Maleki
