= Malik (disambiguation) =

Malik is a Semitic word meaning 'king'.

Malik may also refer to:

== People and communities ==
- Malik (name), including a list of people and fictional characters with the given name and variant surnames
  - Malik (surname), including a list of people with the surname
- Malík, a Czech and Slovak surname, including a list of people with the surname
- Malik (clan), a Jat clan in India and Pakistan
- Malik clan (Bihar), Muslim community in Bihar, India

== Places ==
- Malik, Cambodia
- Malik, Croatia, a village near Bosiljevo
- Malik, Iran, a village in Kerman Province, Iran
- Maliq, formerly Malik, Albania

== Arts and entertainment ==
- Malik (2021 film), an Indian Malayalam political action film
- Malik (2026 film), a Bangladeshi action film
- Malik, a 1975 music album by Lafayette Afro Rock Band

== Other uses ==
- Storm Malik, a 2022 European windstorm
- MALIK (fraternity), an American college fraternity

== See also ==
- Maalik, in Islam, the guardian of hell or purgatory
- Maalik (film), a list of films
- Malach (disambiguation)
- Malak (disambiguation)
- Malaka (disambiguation)
- Malek (disambiguation)
- Malika (disambiguation)
- Mallik Island, in the Canadian Arctic
- Melek (disambiguation)
- Melik (disambiguation)
- Maliki (disambiguation)
