= Melik (disambiguation) =

Melik is a masculine given name and surname of Arabic origin. It is also a hereditary Armenian noble title, in various Eastern Armenian principalities known as melikdoms encompassing modern Yerevan, Kars, Nakhichevan, Sevan, Lori, Artsakh, Northwestern Persia, and Syunik starting from the Late Middle Ages until the end of the nineteenth century. Notable people with the name include:

== Given name ==
- Melik Toğrul Arslan, Seljuk Sultan of Rum
- Melik Rahim Bey (died 1830), Azerbaijani noble
- Melik Brown (born 1984), American football player
- Melik Demirel, Turkish academic
- Melik Mehmed Gazi (1100–1142), ruler of Danishmendids
- Melik Janoyan (born 1985), Armenian javelin thrower
- Melik Khoury, Sierra Leonean-American university administrator
- Melik Ohanian (born 1969), French-Armenian contemporary artist
- Melik Raisian (born 1961), Georgian economist and politician
- Melik Shahnazar II (died 1792), Armenian noble
- Melik Zünnun (died 1175), ruler of Danishmendids

== Surname ==
- Anton Melik (1890–1966), Slovene geographer
- Ioan Mire Melik (1840–1889), Romanian mathematician, educator, and political figure
- Rouben Melik (1921–2007), French-Armenian poet and a member of the French Resistance
- Sayuti Melik (1908–1989), Indonesian typist
- Vasilij Melik (1921–2009), Slovenian historian

== See also ==
- Meliki, formerly Melik, a village and a former municipality in Imathia, Greece
- Melikgyugh, meaning Melik village, a town in the Aragatsotn Province of Armenia
- Musée Edgar Mélik, museum within the historic castle Château de Cabriès
- Malach (disambiguation) / Malakh
- Malak (disambiguation)
- Malek (disambiguation)
- Malik
- Melek (disambiguation)
