= Məlikli =

Məlikli or Melikli or Myalikli or Malikli may refer to:

- Məlikli, Agdam, Azerbaijan
- Məlikli, Qabala, Azerbaijan
- Məlikli, Yardymli, Azerbaijan
- Melikli, Zangilan, Azerbaijan
- Məlikli, Zardab, Azerbaijan
