= Malaka =

Malaka or Malaca may refer to:

== People ==
- Kaus-malaka, king of Udumi (Edom) during the reign of the Assyrian king Tiglath-Pileser III
- Bernward Malaka (born 1962), German internet entrepreneur and consultant
- Malaka Dewapriya (born 1979), Sri Lankan filmmaker, visual artist, radio play writer
- Tan Malaka (1897–1949), Indonesian teacher, philosopher, politician
- Tebogo Malaka, South African Civil Servant

== Places ==
- Malaca in Hispania, the Punic name for Málaga, Spain
- Malaca in Numidia, the Punic name for Calama, now Guelma, Algeria
- Malaka Regency, a regency in the province of East Nusa Tenggara, Indonesia
- Malaka Kingdom, a Tetum kingdom centred in the modern-day regencies of Belu and Malaka, Indonesia
- Malaka Jaya, a village of Duren Sawit, East Jakarta, Indonesia
- Malaka Sari, a village of Duren Sawit, East Jakarta, Indonesia
- Roa Malaka, an administrative village at Tambora subdistrict, West Jakarta, Indonesia
- Selat Malaka, Malaysian, Indonesian and Jawi for Strait of Malacca, a narrow, 550 mi (890 km) stretch of water between the Malay Peninsula and the Indonesian island of Sumatra
- South Malaka, a locality/township of Allahabad, Uttar Pradesh, India
- Malacca, a state in Malaysia
  - Malacca City, capital of the Malaysian state
- Malacca Sultanate, a Malay sultanate centred in the modern-day state of Malacca, Malaysia
- Malakka (Kerala), a village in Thrissur, Kerala, India
- Malka, Jordan, Ottoman name of this Jordanian town

== Other uses ==
- Malakas, a Greek slang word
- Oxycilla malaca, a moth of family Erebidae
- Typhoon Malakas, name of several tropical cyclones in the western north Pacific Ocean
- Malaka (TV series), a Spanish television series released in 2019

== See also ==
- Malak (disambiguation)
- Malik (disambiguation)
- Malacca (disambiguation)
- Málaga, Spain
