= Malika =

Malika may refer to:

== Places ==
=== Nepal ===
- Malika, Baglung, a municipality
- Malika, Dailekh, a village development committee
- Malika Bota, a village development committee
- Malika Rural Municipality, Gulmi
- Malika Rural Municipality, Myagdi
- Malika Dhuri, a mountain

=== Elsewhere ===
- Malika, Thailand, a tambon
- Malika Parbat, a mountain in Pakistan

== Other uses ==
- Malika (given name)
- Malika, a 2015 EP by Tālā

== See also ==
- Malikaa, a 2017 Maldivian film
- Malikah (disambiguation)
- Mallika (disambiguation)
