= Malikova =

Malikova may refer to:

- Malikova, the feminine form of Malikov (surname), Russian and Azerbaijani surname
- Malíková, the feminine form of Malík, Czech and Slovak surname
- Helena Malikova (born 1983), French-Slovak civil servant
