= Malaika (disambiguation) =

"Malaika" is a Swahili song written by Tanzanian musician Adam Salim in 1945.

Malaika may also refer to:

- Malaika (name), a female given name
- Malaika (group), a South African Afro-pop music group
- Malaika (spider), a genus of South African spiders
- Malaika (singer) (born 1972), African American dance singer
- Malaika (actress) (born 1989), Ugandan actress, media personality, model and fashionista
- Malā'ikah, the Islamic view of angels

== See also ==
- Malak (disambiguation)
