= Tahirli =

Tahirli may refer to:

- Tahirli, Akçakoca
- Tahirli, Jalilabad, Azerbaijan
- Tahirli, Yardymli, Azerbaijan
