= Malak (given name) =

Malak is a given name. It derives from the Semitic word for "angel". (Arabic: ملاك, malāk; Hebrew מַלְאָךְ; Ge'ez መልዐክ, mal`āk; Aramaic מלאך). The plural of malak ("angels") is ملائكه malaa`ikahם malakim in Hebrew, and መላዕክት mala`ikt in Ge'ez.

In Arabic and Turkish, it is also used as a given name (both male and female).

The Turkish form of the name is Melek.

- Malak al-Kashif (born 1999), Egyptian transgender activist
- Malak Hifni Nasif (1886-1918), Egyptian feminist and poet
- Malak Jân Nemati (1906-1993), charismatic figure and a mystical writer and poet in Kurdish and Persian language
- Malak Karsh (1915–2001), Canadian photographer
- Malak Ismayil (born 2004), Azerbaijani chess player
- Malak Mattar (born 1999), Palestinian painter
- Malak Sukkar (1946-1992), Syrian pioneer actress

== See also ==
- Malak
- Malak (surname)
