= Mallika =

- Gender: Female
- Language: Sanskrit

Origin
- Meaning: "jasmine" "lamp"
- Region of origin: India

Other names
- Related names: Malika

Mallika is a Sanskrit Indian feminine given name, which means "jasmine". Notable people with the name include:

- Mallika (actress), Indian actress
- Mallika Boonmeetrakool Mahasook, Thai politician
- Mallika Chabba (born 1985), Indian painter
- Mallika Chopra (born 1971), American author and businesswoman
- Mallika Dutt (born 1962), Indian human rights activist
- Mallika Jesudasan (1956–2012), Singaporean murder victim
- Mallika Kapoor (born 1985), Indian actress
- Mallika Karki, Nepalese singer
- Mallika Sarabhai (born 1954), Indian dancer and activist
- Mallika Sengupta (1960–2011), Indian poet
- Mallika Sherawat (born 1976), Indian actress
- Mallika Srinivasan (born 1959), Indian businesswoman
- Mallika Sukumaran (born 1954), Indian actress
- Mallika Badrinath, Indian cookery book author

== See also ==
- Malika (given name)
