= 4th Parliament of Georgia =

The Fourth convocation of Parliament of Georgia (Georgian: საქართველოს მეოთხე მოწვევის პარლამენტი) was elected on November 5, 1995, on the basis of the new constitution.

Elections were held by proportional and majoritarian system. 150 of the 235 mandates of the Parliament were distributed proportionally to the parties that received more than 5% of the votes participating in the elections. 85 deputies were elected from the administrative units of Georgia. 12 majority deputies were automatically empowered, as they represented the majority deputies of Abkhazia's districts, and in the remaining 73 majority districts, elections were held as usual.

| N | Political party | Number of mandates | Proportional | Majoritarian |
|---|---|---|---|---|
| 1 | Union of Citizens of Georgia | 107 | 90 | 17 |
| 2 | National Democratic Party | 34 | 31 | 3 |
| 3 | Democratic Union for Revival | 31 | 25 | 6 |
| 4 | Block "Progress" | 4 | 0 | 4 |
| 5 | Socialist Party of Georgia | 4 | 0 | 4 |
| 6 | Support block | 3 | 0 | 3 |
| 7 | Union of Georgian Traditionalists | 2 | 0 | 2 |
| 8 | Union of Reformers of Georgia "National Consent" | 2 | 0 | 2 |
| 9 | Republican Party of Georgia | 1 | 0 | 1 |
| 10 | State-legal union | 1 | 0 | 1 |
| 11 | "lemm" | 1 | 0 | 1 |
| 12 | Deputies of Abkhazia | 12 | 0 | 12 |
| 13 | Independent candidates | 29 | 0 | 29 |

== List of deputies ==
1. Avtandil Abashidze
2. Aslan Abashidze
3. David Abashidze
4. Dali Abashidze
5. Vakhtang Abashidze
6. Badri Abzianidze
7. Guram Adamashvili
8. Revaz Adamia
9. Vitaly Aydinov
10. Levan Alavidze
11. Nodar Amaglobeli
12. Koba Amirkhanashvili
13. Teimuraz Andriadze
14. Mamuka Areshidze
15. Tamaz Akubardia
16. Armaz Akhvlediani
17. Zurab Akhmeteli
18. Simon (Jemal) Ajiashvili
19. Omar Baziar
20. Irakli Batiashvili
21. Paata Bakuradze
22. Ivane (Valiko) Baliashvili
23. Giorgi Baramidze
24. Malkhaz Baramidze
25. Constantine Barkaia
26. Ramiz Bakirov
27. Mels Bdoyan
28. Petre Beraya
29. Ramaz Berianidze
30. Jemal Beridze
31. Yuri Bibileishvili
32. Giorgi Bichashvili
33. Igor Bogomolov
34. Tamaz Bolkvadze
35. Goderdzi is a book
36. Nino Burjanadze
37. Bezhan (Zurab) Butshrikidze
38. Revaz Gagulashvili
39. Davit Gadelia
40. Demur Gadelia
41. Tamaz Gamkrelidze
42. Giorgi Gachechiladze
43. Hamlet Gegenava
44. Avtandil Geladze
45. Elguja Gvazava
46. Yuri (Giv) Gvritishvili
47. Givi Gigineishvili
48. Manana Gigineishvili
49. Ivane (Mamuka) Giorgadze
50. Valery Giorgobiani
51. Jemal Gogitidze
52. Giorgi Gogniashvili
53. Vakhtang Goguadze
54. Davit Gokadze
55. Bezhan Gunava
56. Roman Dalakishvili
57. Mamia Darchia
58. Tamaz Daushvili
59. Zakaria Devnozashvili
60. Koba Dvalishvili
61. Revaz Diasamidze
62. Rostom Dolidze
63. Giorgi Endeladze
64. Alexander Vanadze
65. Nodar Zazadze
66. Givi Zautashvili
67. Davit Zeikidze
68. Laerti Zubadalashvili
69. Jumber Takniashvili
70. Levan Tediashvili
71. Elene Tevdoradze
72. Lira Topuridze
73. Guram Turmanidze
74. Tamaz Thinadze
75. Dmitry Yankovsky
76. David Injia
77. Boris Kakubava
78. Ilia Kalandadze
79. Geno Kalandia
80. Zaza Kandelaki
81. Davit Kapanadze
82. Gurji Kacharava
83. Neli Kakhidze
84. Igor Kekua
85. Otar Kezherashvili
86. Vladimir is from Kvaratskhelia
87. Gennady (Gela) Kvatchantiradze
88. Roman Kvatchadze
89. Vakhtang Kvinikadze
90. Nestan Kirtadze
91. Giorgi Kobakhidze
92. Konstantin Kokoev
93. Givi Komakhidze
94. Teimuraz Kopaleishvili
95. Nodar Kochlamazashvili
96. Jambul (Jaba) Kokhreidze
97. Roman Kusian
98. Besik Lagvilava
99. Giorgi Lazarashvili
100. Givi Lominadze
101. Grigol (Giga) Lortkipanidze
102. Vazha Lortkipanidze
103. Roza Lortkipanidze
104. Nikoloz Mazmanidi
105. Nugzar (Khuta) Mamaladze
106. Eldar Mamistvalishvili
107. Savel Marsagishvili
108. Ada Marchania
109. Ilia Goliashvili
110. Manuchar Machaidze
111. Marcel Machavariani
112. Mikheil Machavariani
113. Malkhaz (Merab) Makharadze
114. Mikael Makhmudov
115. Konstantine Mgaloblishvili
116. Teimuraz Mgeliashvili
117. Jemal Megrelidze
118. Otar Melkadze
119. Irakli Merebashvili
120. Tamaz Mechiauri
121. Roman Miminoshvili
122. Lasha Mindeli
123. Mariam Mirianashvili
124. Marina waiting
125. Tengiz Motsradze
126. Genrikh Muradian
127. Gizo (Gia) Mchedlidze
128. Nugzar Navadze
129. Shalva Natelashvili
130. Gocha Natenadze
131. Mugadas Neimatov
132. Isaac Novruzov
133. Gayoz Nozadze
134. Zurab Noghaideli
135. Tengiz Onian
136. Davit Onofrishvili
137. Mikheil Osadze
138. Zaza Pataridze
139. Nodar Petashvili
140. Eduard Pochvalinsky
141. Zurab Zhvania
142. Davit Zghenti
143. Father Raik
144. Melik Raisian
145. Vakhtang Rcheulishvili
146. Mikheil Saakashvili
147. Giuli Samkharadze
148. Nikoloz Sanodze
149. Irina Sarishvili-Chanturia
150. Avtandil Sakvarelidze
151. Ramaz Sakvarelidze
152. Revaz Sakvarelidze
153. Jemal Sajaya
154. Jemal Svanidze
155. Zaza Sioridze
156. Zaza Sopromadze
157. Edward Surmanidze
158. Koba Sujashvili
159. Rostom Skhirtladze
160. Amiran Takidze
161. Vakhtang Talakhadze
162. Alexi Tatuashvili
163. Avtandil Tkebuchava
164. Davit Tkeshelashvili
165. Tamaz Fartenadze
166. Alexander Faghava
167. Nodar Paghava
168. German facade
169. Otar facade
170. Arnold Fenderava
171. Tornike is Fifi
172. Vladimir Karseladze
173. Guram Kashakashvili
174. Yuri is a stone
175. Levan Kidzinidze
176. Zurab Khoridze
177. Lana Ghoghoberidze
178. Vakhtang Kolbaya
179. Tamaz Shavtvaladze
180. Ivane (Nukri) Shatirishvili
181. Giorgi Shaishmelashvili
182. Vakhtang Shamiladze
183. Guram Sharadze
184. Tengiz Sharmanashvili
185. Eldar Shengelaya
186. Levan Shengelia
187. Otar Shengelia
188. Murman Shervashidze
189. Amiran Shubitidze
190. Givi Shugarov
191. Jansugh Charkviani
192. Levan Chachua
193. Tariel Chachua
194. Guram Chakhvadze
195. Paata Chekurishvili
196. Eldar Cherkezishvili
197. Kakha Chitaya
198. Leonide (Levan) Chikvanaya
199. Yuri Chikhradze
200. Pikria Chikhradze
201. Merab Chkhaidze
202. Shalva Chkhaidze
203. Zurab Chkheidze
204. Givi Civadze
205. Amiran Tsintsadze (1995-1997)
206. Zurab Tsintskiladze
207. Gia Tsikhistavi
208. Zurab Tskitishvili
209. Mevlud Tsiklauri
210. Soso Tsuntskaladze
211. Anzor Tsotsnava
212. David Tsulukidze
213. Nino (Nani) Chanishvili
214. Davit Cheishvili
215. Davit Chelidze
216. Ivery Chelidze
217. Tengiz Chikaberidze
218. Giorgi Chkhuaseli
219. Giorgi Chkhonia
220. Dilar Khabuliani
221. Vitali Khazaradze
222. Friedon Khalvashi
223. Ioseb Kharatishvili
224. Giorgi Kheviashvili
225. Giorgi Kheladze
226. Noah Khozrevanidze
227. Nino (Khatuna) is Khofer
228. Nestor (Mamuka) Khurtsilava
229. Teimuraz Khurtsidze
230. Ilia Khutsishvili
231. Vano Khukhunaishvili
232. Tamaz Khukhunashvili
233. Alexander Javakhishvili
234. Nodar Jayan
235. Davit Japaridze
236. Shota Japaridze
237. Giorgi Jackeli
238. Tengiz Jgushia
239. Alexander Jibladze
240. Mikhail Djibouti
241. Alexander Jikia
242. Kakha Jikia
243. Abdul Jijavadze
244. Giorgi Jojishvili
245. Bessarion Jugel
246. Idayat Huseynov
