= Maliki (disambiguation) =

Maliki is a school of Islamic law.

Maliki or al-Maliki may also refer to:

== People ==
- Abu Bakr al-Maliki, historian
- Nouri al-Maliki, a former prime minister of Iraq
- Muhammad Alawi al-Maliki, Saudi scholar
- Jonas Maliki, Sense8 character
- Turki Al-Maliki, Saudi colonel

== Places ==
- Maliq, a town and a municipality in Korçë County, Albania
- Maliki, Iran, a village in Hormozgan Province, Iran
- Məliki, a village de jure in the Agdam District of Azerbaijan, de facto in the Martakert Province of the self-proclaimed Republic of Artsakh

== Other uses ==
- Melkite, Middle-Eastern Christians
- Another name for the dingo

== See also ==
- Maleki (disambiguation), other places in Iran and a surname
- Malikism (disambiguation)
- Malik (disambiguation)
