= Artalyta Suryani =

Indonesian entrepreneur

- Born: February 19, 1962 (age 64); Bandar Lampung, Lampung
- Occupation: Businessperson
- Spouse: Surya Dharma
- Children: Imelda Dharma; Rommy Dharma Satyawan
- Criminal charges: Bribery
- Penalty: fives years in prison; 250 million rupiah fine

Artalyta Suryani, also known as Ayin (born February 19, 1962) is an Indonesian entrepreneur known for her involvement in the BLBI (Bantuan Likuiditas Bank Indonesia, Bank Indonesia Liquidity Support) prosecutor graft case. On July 29, 2008, Artalyta was found guilty by the Jakarta Corruption Court and sentenced to five years in prison for bribing Urip Tri Gunawan, chairman of the BLBI investigating prosecutor team, for 660,000 US dollar. The case also implicated a number of officials of the Attorney General's Office of Indonesia, resulting in their resignation or dismissal.

== Controversies ==
=== Land dispute ===
Businesswoman Siti Hartati Murdaya filed a lawsuit against Artalyta Suryani for illegally using the land in Buol Regency managed by Hartati's company PT Cipta Cakra Murdaya. Artalyta countered this by claiming that PT Cipta Cakra Murdaya have had no operating license since 1999. Court proceedings revealed that while PT Cipta Cakra Murdaya was awarded the location permit in 1994 by the regent of Buol, the business permit was awarded in 2011 to PT Sonokeling Buana, while PT Cipta Cakra Murdaya was obstructed from obtaining the permits.

=== Graft ===
Artalyta was arrested by the Corruption Eradication Commission (KPK) in early March 2008, a day after Urip Tri Gunawan was arrested in possession of 660,000 US dollar in cash. Urip was the chairman of the prosecutor team investigating the Bank Indonesia Liquidity Support (BLBI, Bantuan Likuiditas Bank Indonesia) case, which involved business tycoon Sjamsul Nursalim. Deputy Attorney General Kemas Yahya Rahman stopped the investigation on February 29, 2008. A conversation between Artalyta, Urip and Kemas wiretapped by KPK indicated that Artalyta committed bribery to influence the investigation. Artalyta pleaded not guilty, claiming the money was intended to help Gunawan's garage business. The court declined the plea and considered Artalyta's unclear statements in court as an aggravating factor. Artalyta was sentenced to five years in prison and a fine of 250 million rupiah, which was the maximum possible sentence for bribing a government official.

=== Lavish prison ===
In January 2010, a surprise inspection of the Pondok Bambu Women's Prison revealed that Artalyta's cell was equipped with various special facilities. These included an improved bed, sofa, cupboards, television, air conditioning, and baby care products for her adopted baby. She also employed three maids. According to actress and fellow inmate Zarima Mirafsur, this special treatment was in return for Artalyta's "contributions" to the prison.
