= Mallika (disambiguation) =

Mallika is an Indian given name.

Mallika may also refer to:

- Mallika (actress), Indian actress
- Malika Askari or Malika, Indian actress
- Mallika (1957 film), an Indian Tamil-language film
- Mallika (2010 film), an Indian film by Wilson Louis
- Mallika-E-Kitchen, an Indian cookery television series
- Mallika (mango), a mango cultivar
- Mallika jacksoni, a butterfly species
- Mallika Jaan, the protagonist, played by Manisha Koirala, of the 2024 Indian television series Heeramandi
  - "Mallikajaan: The Queen of Heeramandi", the first episode of the TV series
- Dr. Mallika Singhal, fictional plastic surgeon in the 2019 Indian film War, portrayed by Dipannita Sharma

== See also ==
- Malika (disambiguation)
