= Milak, Iran =

Milak, Iran (Persian: ميلك) may refer to:

- Milak, Dashtestan, Bushehr Province
- Milak, Ganaveh, Bushehr Province
- Milak, Qazvin
- Milak, Sistan and Baluchestan

== See also ==
- Milaki, Iran (disambiguation)
