= Mallika Chabba =

Indian painter

- Mallika Chabba
- Born: Dehradun, Uttarkhand, India
- Education: Government College of Fine Art, Chandigarh
- Known for: Artist Painter
- Notable work: Shiva
- Website: www.mallikachabba.com

Mallika Chabba is an Indian painter from Dehradun, India.

== Early life and career ==
Mallika grew up in the town of Dehradun, which lies in North India in a valley at the foothills of the Himalayan range. She started to paint from a very young age with the ambition to become an accomplished artist. Mallika attended the Government College of Fine Art, Chandigarh where she specialized as a sculptor. She completed the college with a Bachelor of Fine Art degree after which she moved to New Delhi to join the Indian National Trust for Art and Cultural Heritage (INTACH). Mallika learnt art restoration while working on oil paintings from the 18th century. She continued to paint and had her first solo exhibition for the charity group Child Health and Welfare Foundation.

Chabba contributed to the group "Bollywood art project" who are transforming the walls of Mumbai into colorful art work. She has also done an exclusive painting for the Bollywood movie BAKRA titled The Divine Goat.

== Exhibitions ==
Year	Gallery	City	Country
2006	Lalit Kala Academy Art Exhibition	Chandigarh	India
2009	‘Potpourri’ Solo Exhibition at the Claridges Hotel	Surajkund	India
2009	Charity Group exhibition For ‘Child Health and welfare Foundation’	Noida	India
2010	‘Ethereal’ Group exhibition at Art Museum	Chandigarh	India
2010	‘Amalgamation’ Group exhibition at Shihan Hussaini Art Gallery	Chennai	India
2010	The Art Conspiracy Festival for Artistic Revolution. The art Loft, Bandra west	Mumbai	India
2011	‘Disart’ Group exhibition	Noida	India
2011	Live painting, at Emaho. Travellers Meet, Café 1947	Old Manali	India
2011	‘Unwritten thoughts’ Group Exhibition at Chandigarh Museum and Art Gallery	Chandigarh	India
2013	Cover and Illustrations for Poetry books by Sandeep Singh IA&AS	Dehradun	India
2016	Group Exhibition Aura Art Gallery	Chandigarh	India
2017	Art director and set designing at “Engine Room” for a performing arts production “Parsley Square”.	Chandigarh	India
2018	‘Light In The Shadows’ Solo Exhibition Jaipur Marriott .	Jaipur	India
2018	Art director and set designing at “Engine Room” for a performing arts production “Akela” at Tagore Theatre.	Chandigarh	India
