= Malaika delicatula =

Scientific classification
- Kingdom: Animalia
- Phylum: Arthropoda
- Subphylum: Chelicerata
- Class: Arachnida
- Order: Araneae
- Infraorder: Araneomorphae
- Family: Phyxelididae
- Genus: Malaika
- Species: M. delicatula

Binomial name
- Malaika delicatula Griswold, 1990

Species of spider

Malaika delicatula is a species of spider in the family Phyxelididae. It is endemic to South Africa.

== Distribution ==
Malaika delicatula is endemic to the Western Cape province of South Africa. It is known from several localities in the Hottentots Holland Mountains including Sir Lowry's Pass, Stellenbosch (Lourensford), Kogelberg Nature Reserve, and Hermanus.

== Habitat and ecology ==
The species is a ground retreat-web cryptic spider that lives in damp and dark places. It has been recorded from the Fynbos biome at elevations ranging from 15 to 347 m above sea level.

== Conservation ==
Malaika delicatula is listed as Data Deficient by SANBI. The species is known only from the type series collected prior to 1901, and its current status remains unclear. More sampling is needed to determine the present species range. The species is protected in the Kogelberg Nature Reserve.

== Taxonomy ==
The species was originally described by Griswold in 1990 from Lourensford in the Western Cape.
