= Malikism (disambiguation) =

Malikism may refer to:

- Malikism is a school of Islamic law.
- Malikism in Algeria is the practice of fiqh jurisprudence in Algeria.

== See also ==
- Maleki (disambiguation)
- Maliki (disambiguation)
