= Yousef Alikhani =

Iranian writer

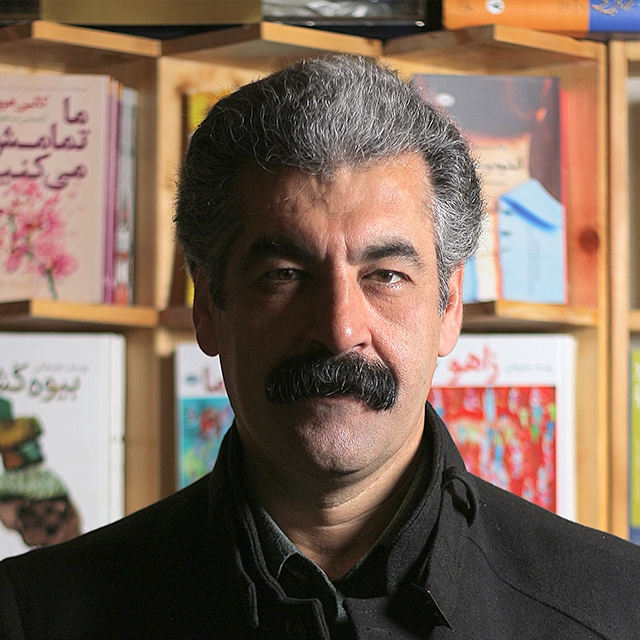
Yousef Alikhani

Yousef Alikhani (Persian: یوسف علیخانی; born 1975) is an Iranian writer.

== Early life ==
Alikhani was born in the Tati-speaking village of Milak, Qazvīn Province. He studied Arabic literature at the University of Tehran.

== Career ==
Alikhani released his third collection of short stories in April 2010.

== Works ==
=== Books ===
- Yousef, Alikhani (2018). خاما. p. 448. ISBN 978-6-003-84032-4.
- Biveh-koshi • Widow Killing, Aamout Publication, 2015. ISBN 978-600-6605-07-4.
- قصه های مردم الموت (Persian Edition) ISBN 978-6-008-59532-8
- Yousef, Alikhani (2010). Haunted In Milak. Candle ad Fog Ltd. p. 120. ISBN 978-9-642-66779-6.
- Aroos-e’-Beed (Willow’s Bride), Aamout Publication, 2009. ISBN 978-600-91197-5-2.
- Dragon Slayage, Aamout Publication, 2007. ISBN 978-600-91197-8-3.
- اژدهاکشان, ISBN 978-6-009-11978-3, 2009
- Yousef, Alikhani (2010). معجون عشق. p. 342. ISBN 978-6-009-15421-0.
- سه گانه یوسف علیخانی (Persian Edition)
- Ghadam Bekheir was my Grandmother, Aamout Publication, 2003. ISBN 978-600-91197-9-0.
- زاهو (Persian Edition), 2022.

=== Other books ===
- Yousef, Alikhani (2015). بیوه‌کشی. p. 304.
- Looking for Hassan Sabbah: the Life story of the god of Alamut for Young Adults, Qoqnoos Publication, 2007. ISBN 964-311-531-3.
- Saeb Tabrizi’s Life, Madraseh Publication, 2007. ISBN 964-385-865-0.
- Ibn Batuteh’s Life, Madraseh Publication, 2004. ISBN 964-385-416-7.
- Aziz and Negar: Re-reading a love story, Qoqnoos Publication, 2002
- The Third Generation of Fiction Writing in Today’s Iran: Interviews with Writers, Markaz Publication, 2001 ISBN 9-6430-5607-4

== Awards ==
Nominated in the Annual Zarrin-ghalam Awards (for “Biveh-koshi” ~ Widow Killing)

Nominated in the Mehregan-e-Adab Awards (for “Aroose Beed” ~ Willow's Bride)

Winner of the 10th Habib Ghanipour Annual Book Prize (for “Aroose Beed”)

Nominated in the 12th Ketab-e-Fasl Awards (for “Aroose Beed”)

Appraised in the 1st Jalal Al-Ahmad Literature Awards & Nominated in the 8th Hushang Golshiri Prize (for “Ezhdehakoshan” ~ Dragon Slaying)

Nominated in the 21st Islamic Republic of Iran Annual Book Awards & Winner of the 16th Roosta Festival Special Prize (for “Ghadam Bekheyr”)

Winner of Best Film in the 7th Young Cinema Regional Awards (for “Aziz & Negar _ A Documentary”)
