= Edgar Mélik =

French painter (1904–1976)

- Born: Paul-Edgar Melik-Minassiantz; 11 July 1904; Paris, France
- Died: 6 April 1976 (aged 71); Cabriès, France
- Education: Académie Lhote; Académie Scandinave; Académie Ranson
- Alma mater: Sorbonne
- Known for: Painting
- Movement: Surrealism, Expressionism
- Memorials: Musée Edgar Mélik

Edgar Mélik (born Paul-Edgar Melik-Minassiantz; 11 July 1904 – 6 April 1976) was a French painter of Armenian descent.

== Life and career ==
Mélik was born on 11 July 1904 in Paris to a family of Armenian origin. His mother was from Constantinople, and his father, a jeweler who settled in Paris, was born in Tabriz.

Mélik studied English and German at the Sorbonne before beginning to paint in 1928. He subsequently enrolled in the independent art academies of Montparnasse, training at the Académie Lhote, the Académie Scandinave (under Charles Dufresne and Othon Friesz), and, from January 1930, the Académie Ranson (under Amédée de la Patellière and Roger Bissière).

During his time in Paris, his first studio was located on the rue de Vaugirard, where he lived near the sculptors Constantin Brâncuși and Alberto Giacometti. He frequently visited the Maison des Amis des Livres, the bookshop of Adrienne Monnier, whom he depicted in his painting L'Atelier Idéal. His artistic philosophy was shaped by literary figures such as Arthur Rimbaud, Franz Kafka, Friedrich Nietzsche, and the Comte de Lautréamont. While he was influenced by Vincent van Gogh and Pablo Picasso's break from artistic tradition, Mélik did not adhere to cubism. He sought what he called a "plastic spirituality", declaring to the journal Comœdia in 1941 that he "rubs shoulders with surrealism but remains Nietzschean."

Mélik's travels significantly influenced his early work. He visited Morocco in late 1928, returning in 1933 for an exhibition at the Galerie Marcel Lévy in Tangier. His travels through Málaga, Granada, and Murcia produced early sketches of the region. He held his first Parisian exhibition in 1930 at the Galerie Carmine.

On 7 October 1932, intending to travel to the Far East, Mélik left Paris. His journey ended in Marseille, where he established a small studio on the rue Port Saïd, near the Plage des Catalans. His works from this period depict fishermen, street scenes, the Old Port, and the city's red-light districts. He was associated with the Compagnie du rideau gris theatrical troupe and the literary magazine Les Cahiers du Sud, which eventually published fifteen articles reviewing his exhibitions. In 1934, he held his first Marseille exhibition at the Galerie Da Silva.

Facing financial difficulties in February 1934, Mélik rented a portion of the Château de Cabriès, located between Aix-en-Provence and Marseille. This studio became the center of his artistic production. Though he continued to exhibit in Paris and Marseille, he distrusted the commercial art market and preferred to sell his work directly to visitors at the château.

=== Style ===
Mélik's body of work includes over 2,000 creations across various mediums, utilizing canvas, burlap, fiber cement, wood, and even boat sails. His use of colour evolved over his career: relying heavily on ochres in the early 1930s, shifting to a broader palette of warm colours in the 1940s, and restricting himself primarily to the primary colours of red, yellow, and blue from 1960 onwards.

Following a personal and artistic crisis between 1944 and 1946, Mélik shifted from painting external reality to creating a self-contained visual universe, stating, "My painting is a monolith." His technique progressed from smooth surfaces to textured matterism (matiérisme) by 1957, incorporating fragments of tile and thick grains of paint into his works.

He frequently depicted female figures, animals, and portraits of contemporaries such as Jean Mermoz, Victor Brauner, and Marcel Marceau, while rarely painting landscapes and still lifes.

Mélik died of a heart attack in front of his fireplace at the Château de Cabriès on 6 April 1976, at the age of 71.

== Legacy ==
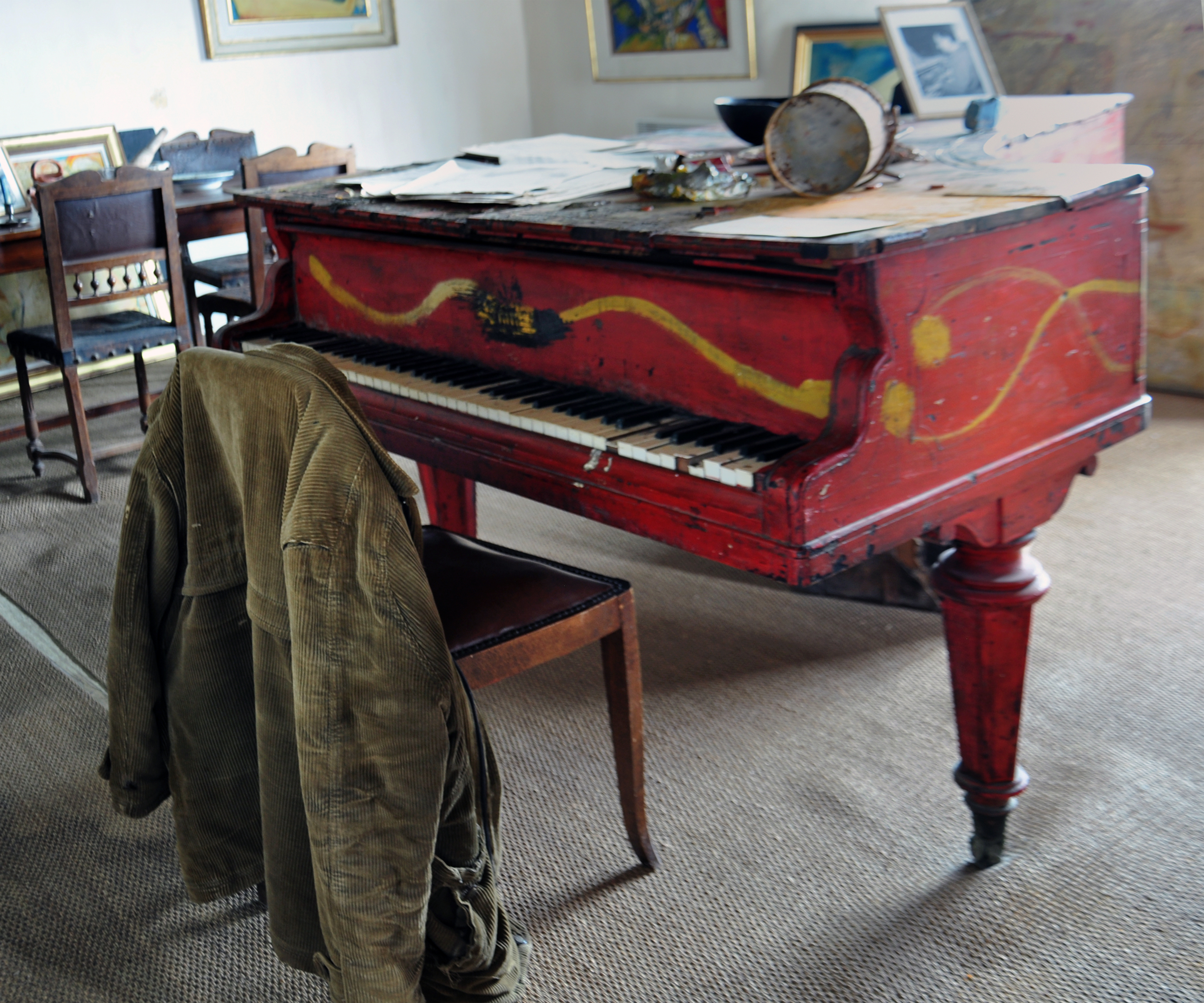
Mélik's red piano on display at the Musée de Cabriès.

In 1980, the Château de Cabriès was converted into the Musée Edgar Mélik. The museum preserves his former studio, including his distinct red grand piano and the chapel walls, which he covered in frescoes to create a Gesamtkunstwerk. The museum holds a permanent collection of his drawings and paintings and hosts annual summer exhibitions featuring other notable artists.

Reflecting on his body of work, the Belgian writer and critic Hubert Juin noted in his 1953 monograph: "Mélik's canvases scream. And for better or worse, we will have to hear them."

Mélik's works continue to be traded in the secondary art market and European auction houses.

== Bibliography ==
- Juin, Hubert (1953). Edgar Mélik ou la Peinture à la pointe du temps (in French). Marseille: Éditions de la Mandragore.
- Pontier, Jean-Marc. Les Sentinelles d'Edgar Mélik (Unpublished manuscript).
- Malis, Danièle. Déluge mystique (Exhibition catalogue). Éditions Musée de Cabriès, 1994.
- Stamboulian, Joseph. Mélik au fil des jours (Self-published, 2015).
