= Malka, Jordan =

Malka village بلدة ملكا
- Town
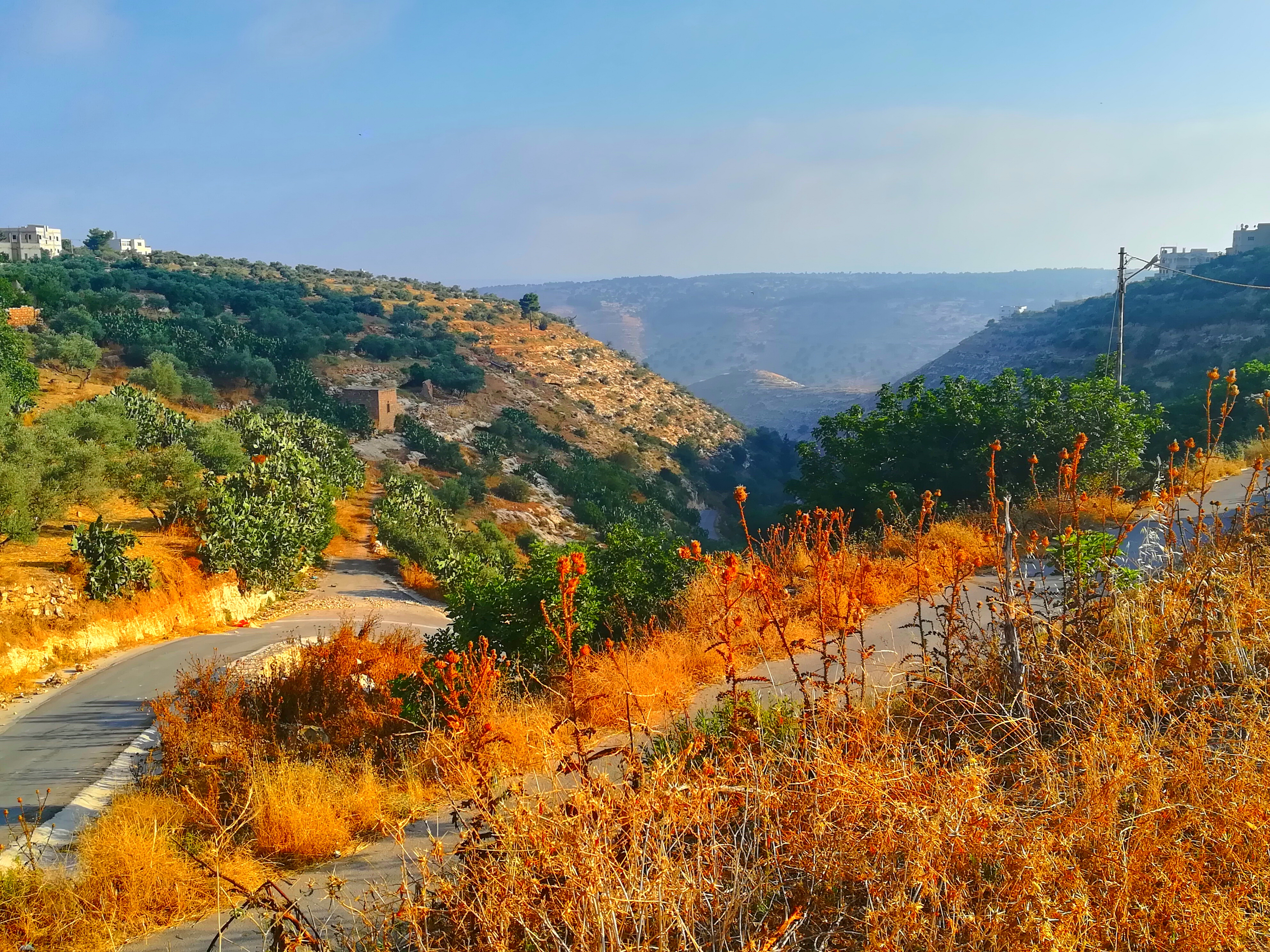
- Northern part of town

- Flag Seal

- Location within Jordan
- Coordinates: 32°40′27″N 35°45′00″E
- PAL: 221/232
- Country: Jordan
- Governorate: Irbid

Government
  - Mayor of Khalid Bin Al Waleed Municipality: Khaled Malkawi

Population (2015)
  - Total: 11,706
- Time zone: GMT +2
  - Summer (DST): +3
- Area code: +962(2)

Malka (Arabic: ملكا) is a town in Irbid Governorate, Jordan, within Bani Kinanah District. Official locality tables published by the Department of Statistics list Malka among the localities of Irbid. The village has the largest population in the Bani Kinanah region, with a total population of 14,618 people.

Malka is associated with Al-Arayes Pond, a natural pond/wetland site in the same district that has received conservation and press attention for its biodiversity and role for birds.

Malka Municipality was established in 1974 and remained so until 2001, when the municipalities in the Malka area were merged with Khalid bin Al-Waleed Municipality. Later, Malka and Mansoura Municipality, which is affiliated with Khalid bin Al-Waleed Municipality, was founded. Malka has a post office that was established in 1966, and a park was also created to serve the people of Malka and the surrounding villages.

== Name origin ==
Malka was named after a Roman queen who lived there, named "Malka." The caves, grottos, and olive trees indicate that Malka was home to various civilizations, including the Roman, Islamic, and Ottoman eras. It is also known for its rich traditions, customs, and folk songs.

== Demography ==
Jordan's official end‑2025 locality estimates list Malka with an estimated total population of 14,618 (7,428 male; 7,190 female) and 3,041 households.

Within Irbid Governorate, the Ministry of Interior describes the governorate as being in the far north of the country, with boundaries extending to the Jordanian–Syrian border and up to the Yarmouk River area.

== Geography and environment ==
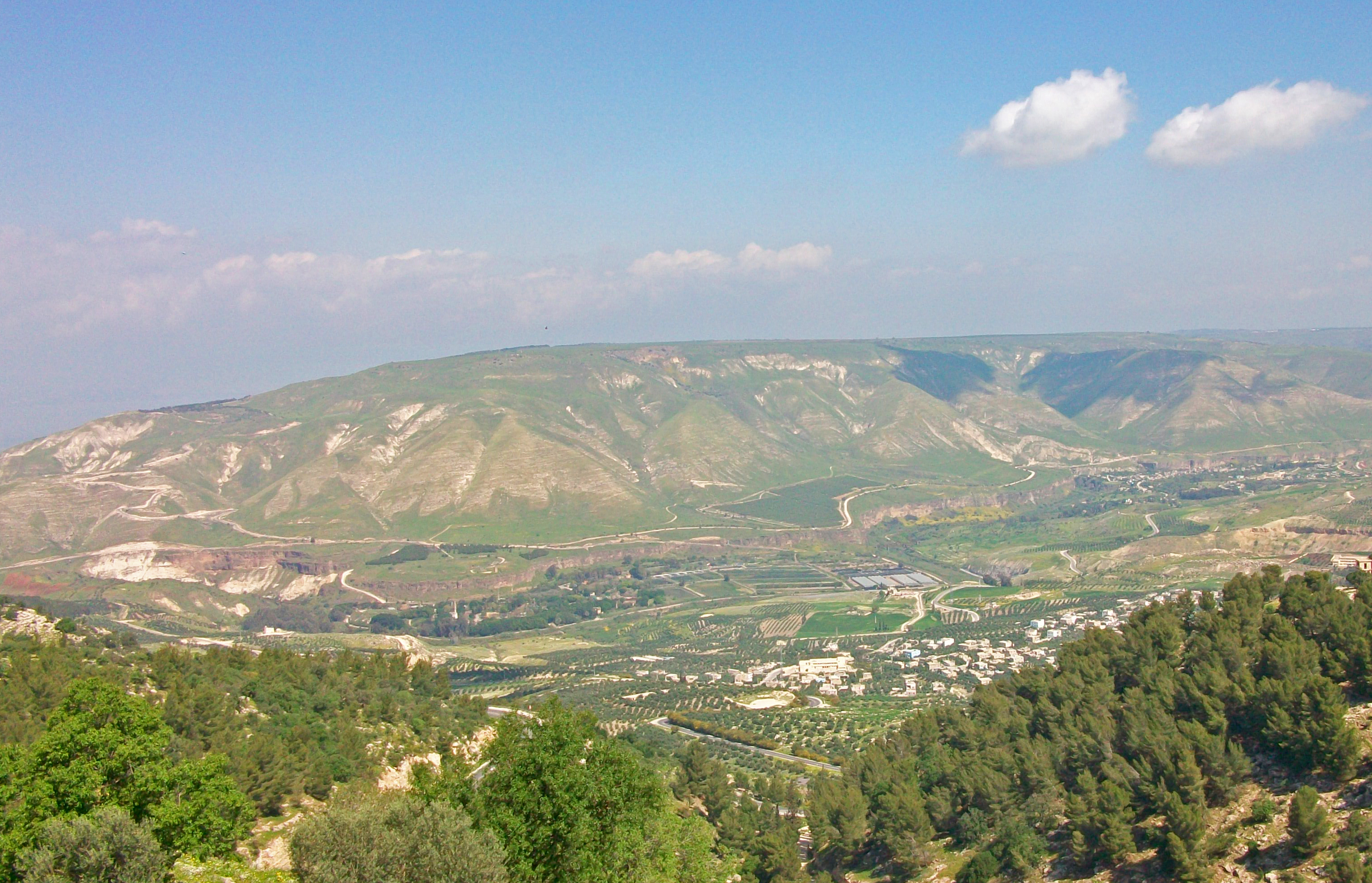
A view from Malka shows Al-Himma al-Urduniyya in the Jordan Valley of Bani Kinanah Department

Irbid Governorate lies in northern Jordan, with territory extending towards the Jordanian–Syrian border and the Yarmouk River; this broader setting helps explain why local wetlands and river-adjacent habitats in the governorate receive attention for ecology and bird migration.

Malka is located on a mountainous agricultural land with red soil. It is about 91 km from the capital Amman and from Irbid 22 km. It rises about 500 meters above sea level and is bordered to the east by Hatem and Abder, from the west by Umm Qays, from the north by Syria, from the south by Dukra and Kufr Asad. The total area of the organized land is approximately 1,700 dunums, and for the unorganized lands, it is about 8,096 dunums. Malka owned by Khalid bin al-Walid municipality, headed by Hussein Al-Malkawi.

=== Administration and local government ===
A Jordanian government municipal profile states that Khalid bin Al-Waleed Municipality was established on 9 August 2001 as part of municipal restructuring, and that it united five localities/areas, including Malka, Mansoura, Umm Qais, Al‑Mkhaybeh (Al‑Tahta), and Al‑Himma al‑Urduniyya.

=== Al-Arayes Pond ===
Jordanian press reporting places Al-Arayes Pond in far north‑west Jordan in Bani Kinanah District (Irbid Governorate). Published descriptions of the pond's physical characteristics vary by source and context, but multiple accounts describe a water body on the order of ~10 dunums and a depth around ~50 metres. Several newspapers frames the pond as a distinctive natural/geological feature and provides these figures.

=== Biodiversity and conservation context ===
Conservation-focused messaging and Jordanian press describe the pond as supporting resident and migratory birds and providing water for wildlife, with ecological value attributed to its role as a water source and habitat. The same coverage connects the pond to broader protected-landscapes management in the region. The Royal Society for the Conservation of Nature and press reporting describe the pond as lying within the area of the Khalid bin Al‑Waleed municipality near the Yarmouk River, and as environmentally relevant to the nearby Yarmouk Forest Reserve.

International conservation databases also include a profile for "Birket Al Arayes" on Protected Planet (drawing on the World Database on Protected Areas and associated UNEP‑WCMC compilation).

=== Tourism ===
Official tourism material from the Jordan Tourism Board lists "Arayes pond" among birdwatching sites that can be visited while basing in Ajloun and exploring nearby reserves.

== History ==
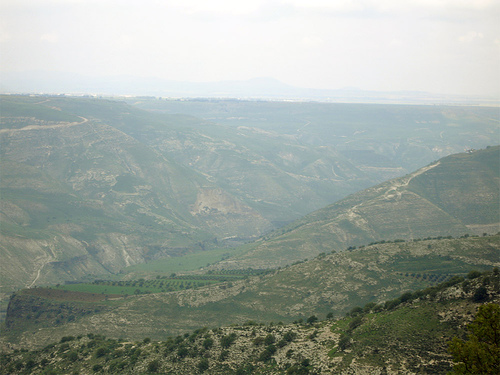
The battlefield of Yarmouk across a ravine.

The town overlooks the ancient Roman city of Jadara, which was one of the ten cities that made up the Decapolis union.

In August 636 the Battle of Yarmouk took place there between the Rashidun Caliphate and the Byzantine Empire which resulted in the Muslim conquest of the Levant.

=== Ottoman era ===
In 1596 it appeared in the Ottoman tax registers named as Malaka, situated in the nahiya (subdistrict) of Bani Kinana, part of the Sanjak of Hawran. It had 27 households and 15 bachelors; all Muslim. The villagers paid a fixed tax-rate of 25% on agricultural products; including wheat (4200 a.), barley (900 a.), summer crops (640 a.), fruit trees (1200 a.), and goats and bee-hives (140 a.). The total tax was 7,500 akçe. In 1838 Malka's inhabitants were predominantly Sunni Muslim.

In 1859 AD, the Governor of Irbid issued memorandum of lineage to the Ottomon government, testifying for the people of Malka and their lineage. See the note to the right.

Lineage Note, Governor of Irbid, Ishaq, 1859 AD

Raising this memorandum

The residents of the village of Malka, mentioned in the orders and memoranda from the great ministers and from our Muslim ancestors, that they are from the lineage of our master, the Qutb, Abdul Qadir Gilani, and in honor of their grandfather, that no one should oppose them in any way. Therefore, it was necessary to write this memorandum for them from us so that, by virtue of it and by virtue of the orders that are in them, no one should oppose them in any way.

Governor of Irbid Ishaq, 1859 AD

The Jordanian census of 1961 found 1,634 inhabitants in Malka.

== Notable figures ==
- Sheikh Ahmad bin Rashid bin Tarqan Al-Malkawi, grew up in Damascus, where he worked and worked in jurisprudence and hadeeth, he was mentioned in Extensive response book. He died in the year between 1400 and 1401.
- Suhaib Al Malkawi announcer on Al Jazeera
- Abdallah Malkawi announcer on France 24
- Mohammad Al-Malkawi is a Jordanian general that held the post of Chairman of the Joint Chiefs of Staff of the Jordanian Armed Forces from 18 July 1999 to 5 March 2002.
- As noted in the memorandum above, the Malkawi family traces back to Abdul Qadir Gilani.

== Bibliography ==
- Government of Jordan, Department of Statistics (1964). First Census of Population and Housing. Volume I: Final Tables; General Characteristics of the Population (PDF).
- Hütteroth, W.-D.; Abdulfattah, K. (1977). Historical Geography of Palestine, Transjordan and Southern Syria in the Late 16th Century. Erlanger Geographische Arbeiten, Sonderband 5. Erlangen, Germany: Vorstand der Fränkischen Geographischen Gesellschaft. ISBN 3-920405-41-2.
- Robinson, E.; Smith, E. (1841). Biblical Researches in Palestine, Mount Sinai and Arabia Petraea: A Journal of Travels in the year 1838. Vol. 3. Boston: Crocker & Brewster.
