= Milaki, Iran =

Milaki or Mileki or Meylaki (Persian: ميلكي) may refer to:

- Milaki, Hormozgan

== See also ==
- Milak, Iran (disambiguation)
- Maleki (disambiguation)
