= Malacca (disambiguation) =

Malacca is a state in Malaysia.

Malacca may also refer to:

== Places ==
- Malacca City or Malacca Town, the capital of the state of Malacca, which is recognised as UNESCO World Heritage site
  - Malacca River, which flows through Malacca City
  - Malacca Island, a man-made island
- Malacca Sultanate, an early sultanate based in the Malacca area
- Strait of Malacca, a major waterway separating Malaya and Sumatra
- Crown Colony of Malacca, formed in 1946 and merged with the Federation of Malaya after gaining independence from the United Kingdom in 1957
- Malacca, a barangay in Panglima Sugala, Tawi-Tawi, Philippines
- Malacca, the tourist name for the village U-rèk-ka on Car Nicobar, an island in India's Andaman and Nicobar Islands
- Malacca, Car Nicobar, a village in India
- Malacca, Nancowry, a village in India
- Malacca Banks, sandbanks in India's Gulf of Khambhat

== Other uses ==
- Battle of Malacca (disambiguation)
- HMS Malacca, three ships
- Malacca International Airport, Batu Berendam, Malacca, Malaysia
- Malacca FM, a regional Malay language radio station in Malacca City
- Malacca, the stem of the rattan palm, used for making walking sticks and umbrella sticks
- Malacca tree, a common name for Phyllanthus emblica

== See also ==
- Malaka (disambiguation)
- Molucca (disambiguation)
- Malakka (Kerala), a village in Kerala, India
- Malakas, a Greek slang word
