= Malika Dhuri =

Coordinates: 28°28′15″N 83°17′36″E

Malika Dhuri is a 3,700 m (12,100 ft) high mountain peak in Muna, Myagdi, Nepal. The name is derived from two local words Malika (name of the place) and Dhuri (mountain peak).

== Geography ==
It entirely lies in Dhaulagiri Rural Municipality - 3, Muna, Nepal. It touches the borderline of Baglung District. Its height is about 3,700 m (12,100 ft) above sea level. It touches the border line of Dhorpatan hunting reserve. Almost all the villages around the Myagdi River (also called Myagdi Khola in the local language) and few parts of Baglung District can be seen from this place. It is the peak place of Muna village and also of the Myagdi District. It is taller than other mountains in Myagdi District as well as in Baglung District. As it lies on the border of Myagdi and Baglung; it may also be known by the name of “joint view point of myagdi and baglung”.

At the peak, there is no forest. But on the lower portion there is a dense forest. From this forest two rivers come out. In this forest (in Malika Dhuri) there are many wild animals and birds such as Ghoral, Kasturi (musk deer), danphe, and munnal. From the peak of this Malika Dhuri in the northern part, Dhaulagiri, Churen, Gurja hills and in the eastern part, Machapuchare hills can be seen. This peak is covered with snow in the winter season and temperature falls below zero degrees Celsius. In the summer season it seems green.

The old people of Muna village say that here used to hold a fair up to 2003 B.S.(1946 A.D.).

== Gallery ==
Views seen from malika dhuri to the east showing Mt. machhapuchchhre

Views seen from malika dhuri to the south showing the northern part of baglung district

Views seen from malika dhuri to the east along myagdi khola

Views seen from malika dhuri to the north showing Mt. dhaulagiri

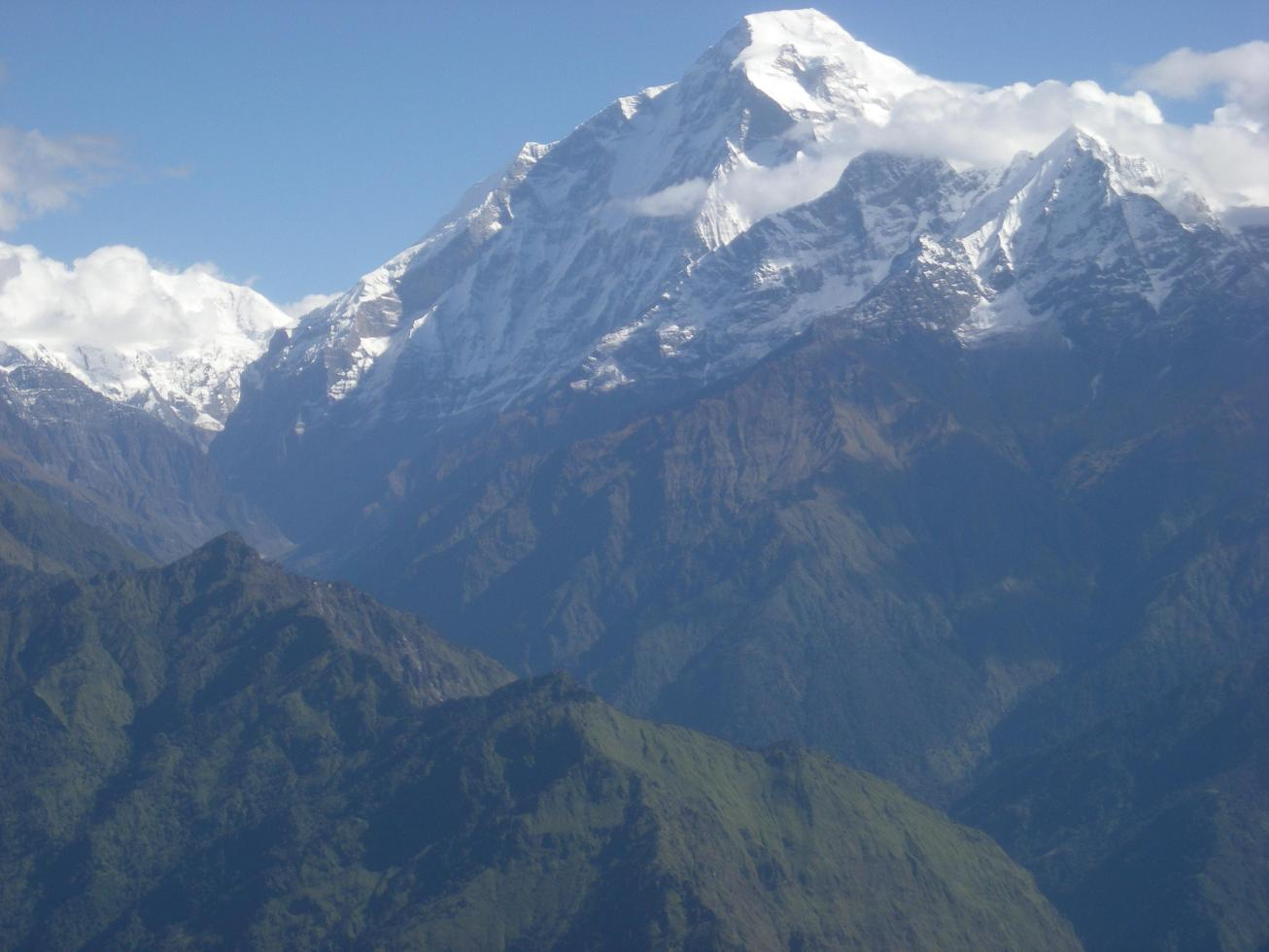
Views seen from malika dhuri to the north showing Mt. dhaulagiri

Views seen from malika dhuri to the north showing Mt.dhaulagiri with clouds
