= Malikah =

Malikah may refer to:

- Malikah, the Semitic word for queen (see Malik)
- Malikah, Yemen
- Malikah or Al-Nadirah, princess of Hatra

== See also ==
- Malik (disambiguation)
