= Molucca (disambiguation) =

- The Moluccas or Maluku Islands are an archipelago in Indonesia.
- Moluccans are the indigenous people of the Moluccas

Molucca, Moluccas, or Moluccan may also refer to:

- Molucca Sea. sea northwest of the Moluccas
- Gran Moluccas, historical name for Mindanao, Philippines
- Molucca bean, Hebridean name for nickernut

== See also ==
- Malacca (disambiguation), similar spelling
