= Malikov (surname) =

Malikov (Russian: Маликов; feminine: Malikova, Russian: Маликова) is a Turkic muslim surname. Notable people with the surname include:

- Afag Malikova (born 1947), Azerbaijani dancer
- Anna Malikova (born 1965), Uzbek pianist
- Andrey Malikov (born 1954), Soviet speed skater
- Arif Malikov (1933–2019), Azerbaijani and Soviet composer
- Asif Malikov (born 1971), Azerbaijani weightlifter
- Dmitri Malikov (footballer) (born 1977), Russian footballer
- Dmitry Malikov (born 1970), Russian composer, singer and record producer
- Najiba Malikova (1921–1992) Azerbaijani actress
- Nigar Malikova (born 1983), Azerbaijani footballer
- Pavel Malikov (born 1986), Russian boxer
- Rail Malikov (born 1985), Azerbaijani footballer
- Telman Malikov (born 1950), Azerbaijani scientist
- Valeriy Malikov (1942–2016), Ukrainian statesmen

== See also ==
- Malíkov
