= Malak (surname) =

Malak is a surname. Notable people with the surname include:

- Jonah Malak, Canadian documentary filmmaker, producer and editor
- Hedaya Malak (born 1993), Egyptian taekwondo practitioner
- Rima Abdul Malak (born 1979), French politician
- Waldemar Malak (1970 1992), weightlifter from Poland

== See also ==
- Malachias
- Malak
- Malak (given name)
