= Al-Arayes Pond =

Pond in Bani Kinanah district, Jordan

- Al-Ara'is Pond
- بركة العرائس (Arabic); بركة العرايس (Levantine Arabic)
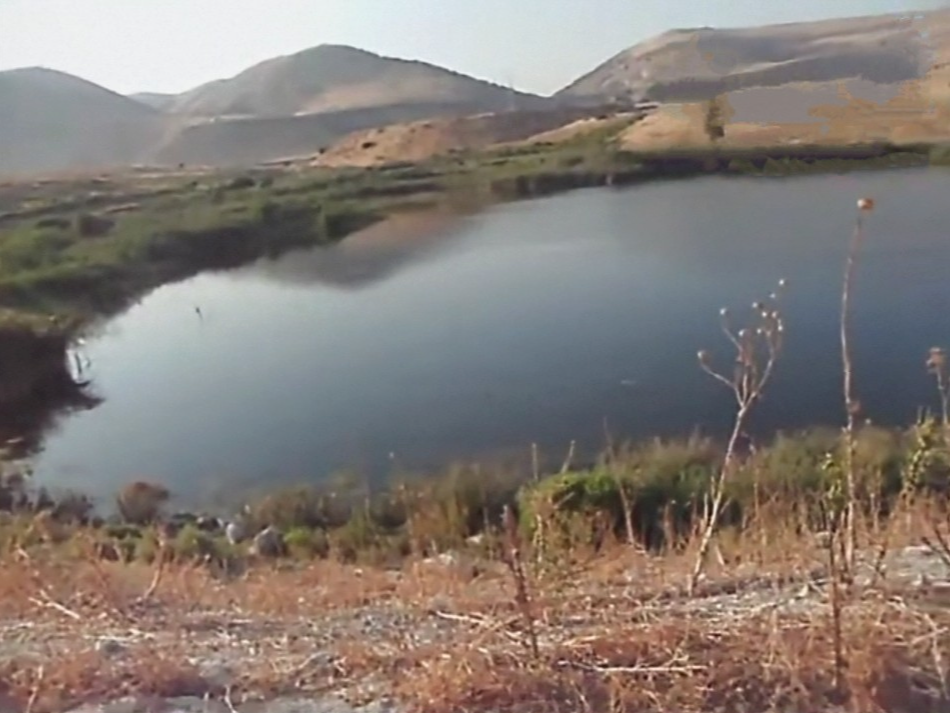
- View of the lake

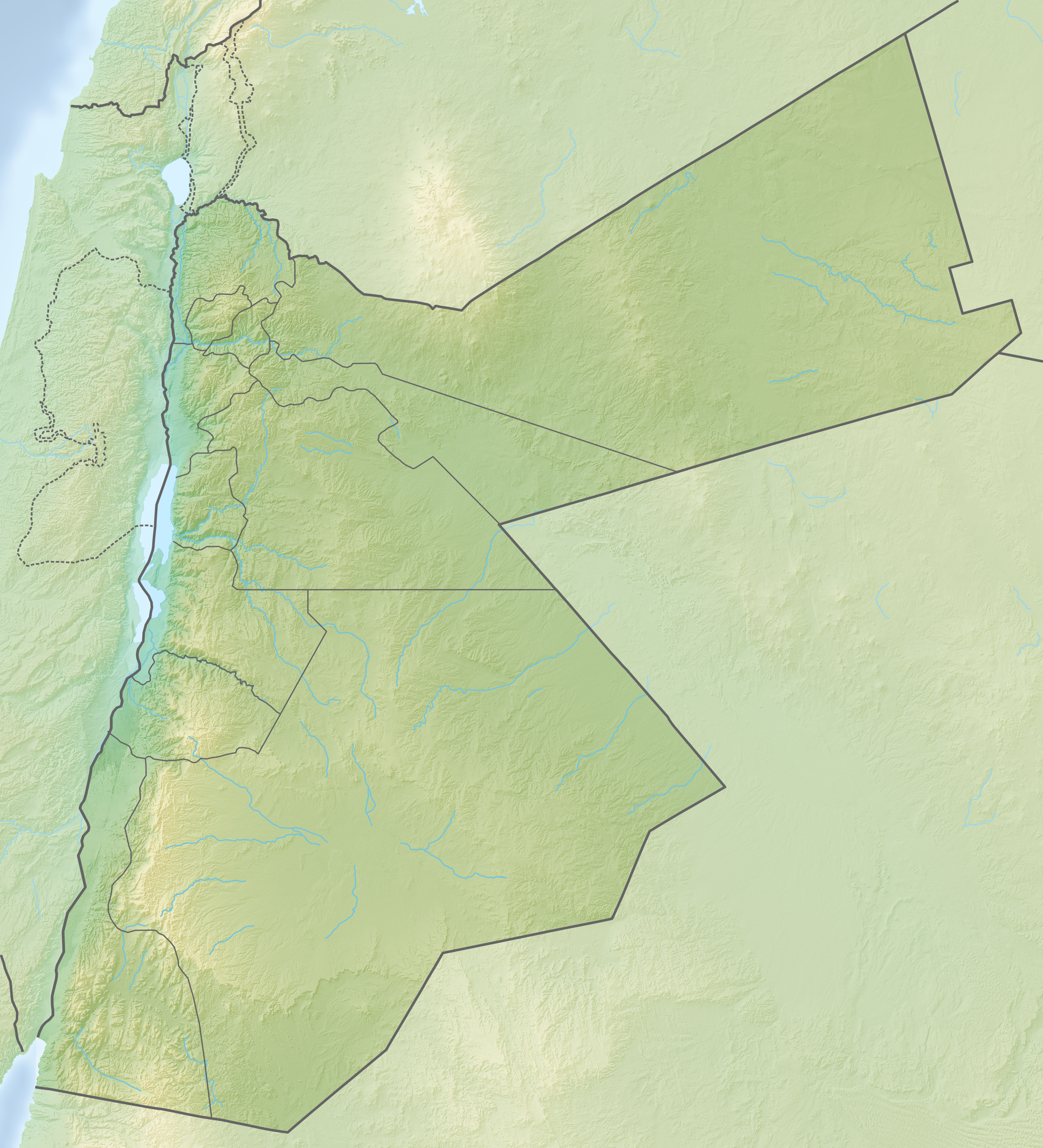
- Location within Jordan Location within Middle East Location within Asia
- Coordinates: 32°42′13″N 35°41′50″E
- Type: Natural Pond
- Primary inflows: Major inflow sources — rainfall and underground aquifers
- Basin countries: Jordan
- Max. length: 10 dunums (10,000 m^{2})
- Max. width: 0.1 km (0 mi) (Approx. 100 meters)
- Surface area: 32 km^{2} (7,907 acres) (Approx. 7,915.2 acres)
- Average depth: 50 m (164 ft)
- Max. depth: 60 m (197 ft)
- Water volume: 200,000 m^{3} (0 km^{3})
- Shore length^{1}: 300 m (984 ft)
- Frozen: Never
- Islands: None
- Sections/sub-basins: Overview
- Settlements: Malka, Irbid Governorate, Jordan
- ^{1} Shore length is not a well-defined measure.

Al-Arayes Pond (Jordanian Arabic: بركة العرايس, romanized: Birket il-ʿArāyis) or Al-Ara'is Pond (Standard Arabic: بركة العرائس, romanized: Birkat al-ʿArāʾis, lit. 'Brides' Pond') is a natural water body located in the village of Malka, within the Bani Kinanah district of Irbid Governorate in northern Jordan. Situated approximately 500 meters south of the Yarmouk River and near the Jordanian Hamma and Al-Wehda Dam, the pond lies opposite the Golan Heights, with the Yarmouk River serving as the boundary.

== Geographical features ==
The pond covers a surface area of about 10 dunums (10,000 m^{2}), with the surrounding area encompassing around 32 km^{2} (7,907 acres). Its depth is estimated to be 50 m (164 ft), with a maximum depth of 60 m (197 ft). The primary source of water for Al-Arayes Pond is rainfall, and it is utilized for irrigating nearby agricultural lands. The Royal Society for the Conservation of Nature states that Birket Al Arayes occupies a unique ecological location and preserves numerous wildlife species (both animal and plant) that have become endangered due to the advancement of human civilization. Its significance is also heightened by the fact that it remains filled with water year-round, thanks to a spring at its bottom.

The director of the Environmental Studies Center at the Hashemite University mentioned that the pond water accumulates in the depression, forming a pool, but its exact nature remains unclear. He noted that the area might suggest the presence of hot water or organic compounds like methane or hydrogen sulfide, possibly indicating underlying hydrocarbon resources. The hole has a diameter of about one kilometer, with depths ranging from 30 meters at the edges to 50 meters in the center. The external diameter is estimated to be around 5 kilometers, with additional measurements planned.

Environmental experts note that the pond and its surroundings are home to various reptile species recorded in Jordan, including lizards, snakes (Natrix tessellata), and frogs such as the green toad and marsh frog. There are also over a hundred species of resident and migratory birds in the area. Another experts caution that the pond could face environmental decline if neglected, with some species of freshwater turtles already at risk due to pollution and limited food sources. The study also indicates the presence of rare mammals in the area, including the Egyptian mongoose, red fox, wolf, jackal, striped hyena, forest cat, and European hedgehog. The forest cat and water fox are particularly vulnerable species.
