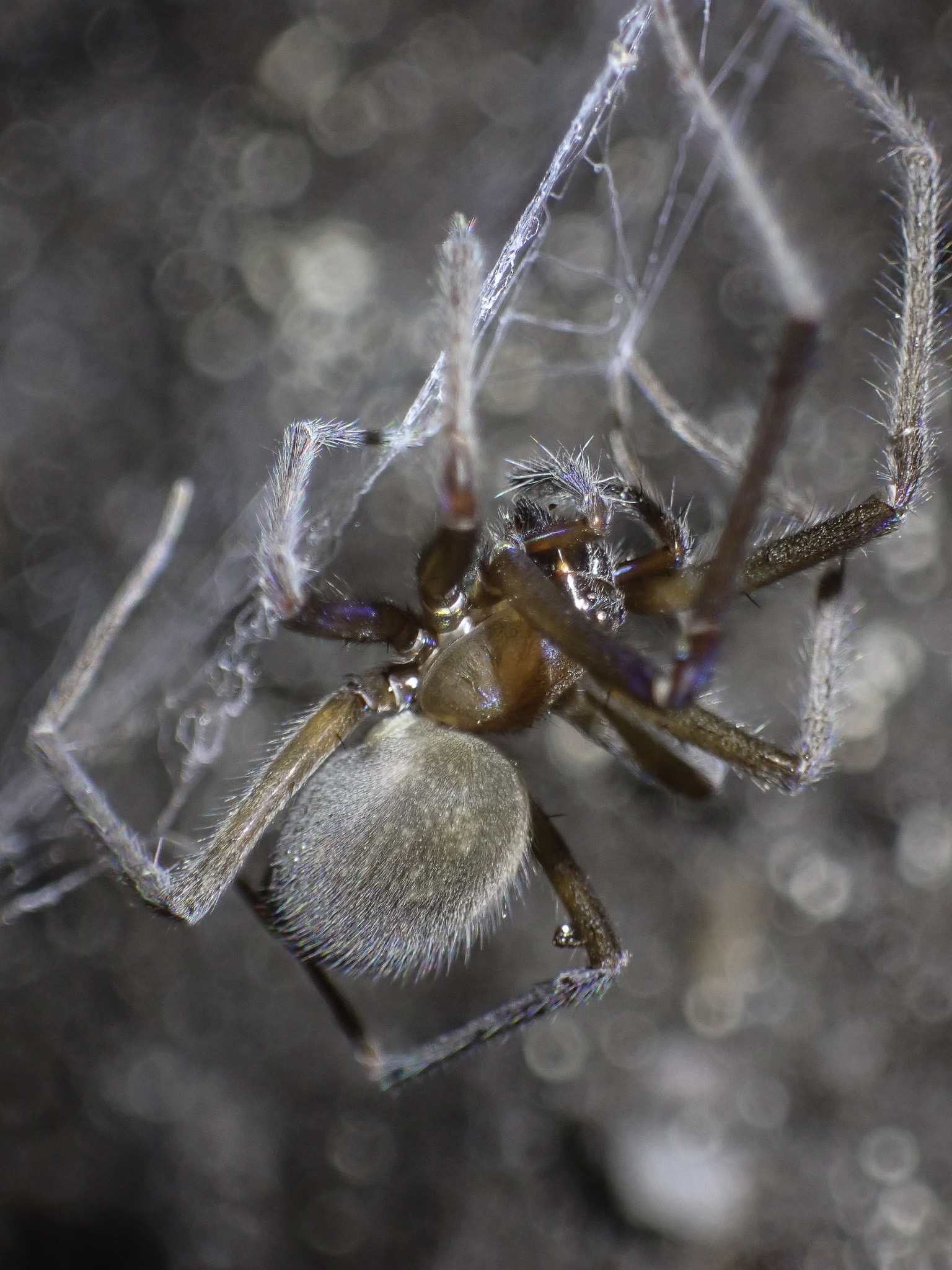

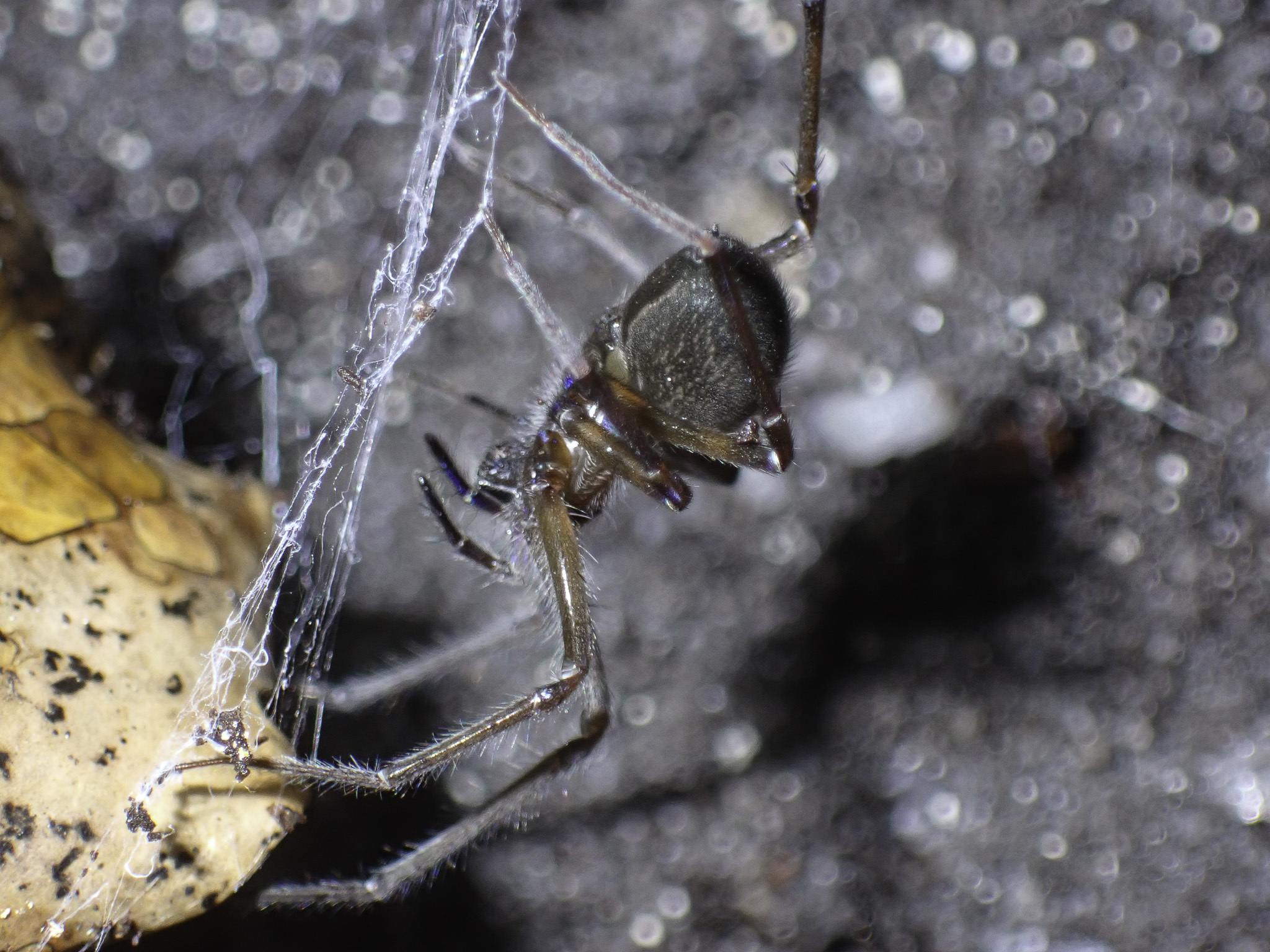

Conservation status
- Least Concern (IUCN 3.1)

Scientific classification
- Kingdom: Animalia
- Phylum: Arthropoda
- Subphylum: Chelicerata
- Class: Arachnida
- Order: Araneae
- Infraorder: Araneomorphae
- Family: Phyxelididae
- Genus: Malaika
- Species: M. longipes

Binomial name
- Malaika longipes (Purcell, 1904)

Synonyms
- Auximus longipes Purcell, 1904; Haemilla grindleyi Lawrence, 1964; Phyxelida grindleyi Brignoli, 1983

= Malaika longipes =

Species of spider

Malaika longipes is a species of spider in the family Phyxelididae. It is endemic to South Africa and is commonly known as the Table Mountain malaika hackled band spider.

== Distribution ==
Malaika longipes is endemic to the Western Cape province of South Africa, with a distribution centered around the Cape Peninsula. Notable locations include Constantia, Kalk Bay Caves, Muizenberg, Simon's Town, and numerous locations within Table Mountain National Park including Bats Caves, Constantia Berg Caves, Devil's Peak, Skeleton Gorge, Kirstenbosch National Botanical Garden, Newlands Forest, Wynberg Caves, Cecilia Spilhaus, Constantia Nek, Orange Kloof, and Tokai.

== Habitat and ecology ==
The species is a ground retreat-web cryptic spider that lives in damp and dark places. It has been found mostly in moister ravines on the slopes of Table Mountain, in indigenous forest, as well as Fynbos. The species has been recorded from primary and indigenous forest, as well as the Wynberg Caves in Table Mountain and Kalk Bay Caves. It occurs at elevations from 6 to 279 m above sea level.

== Description ==
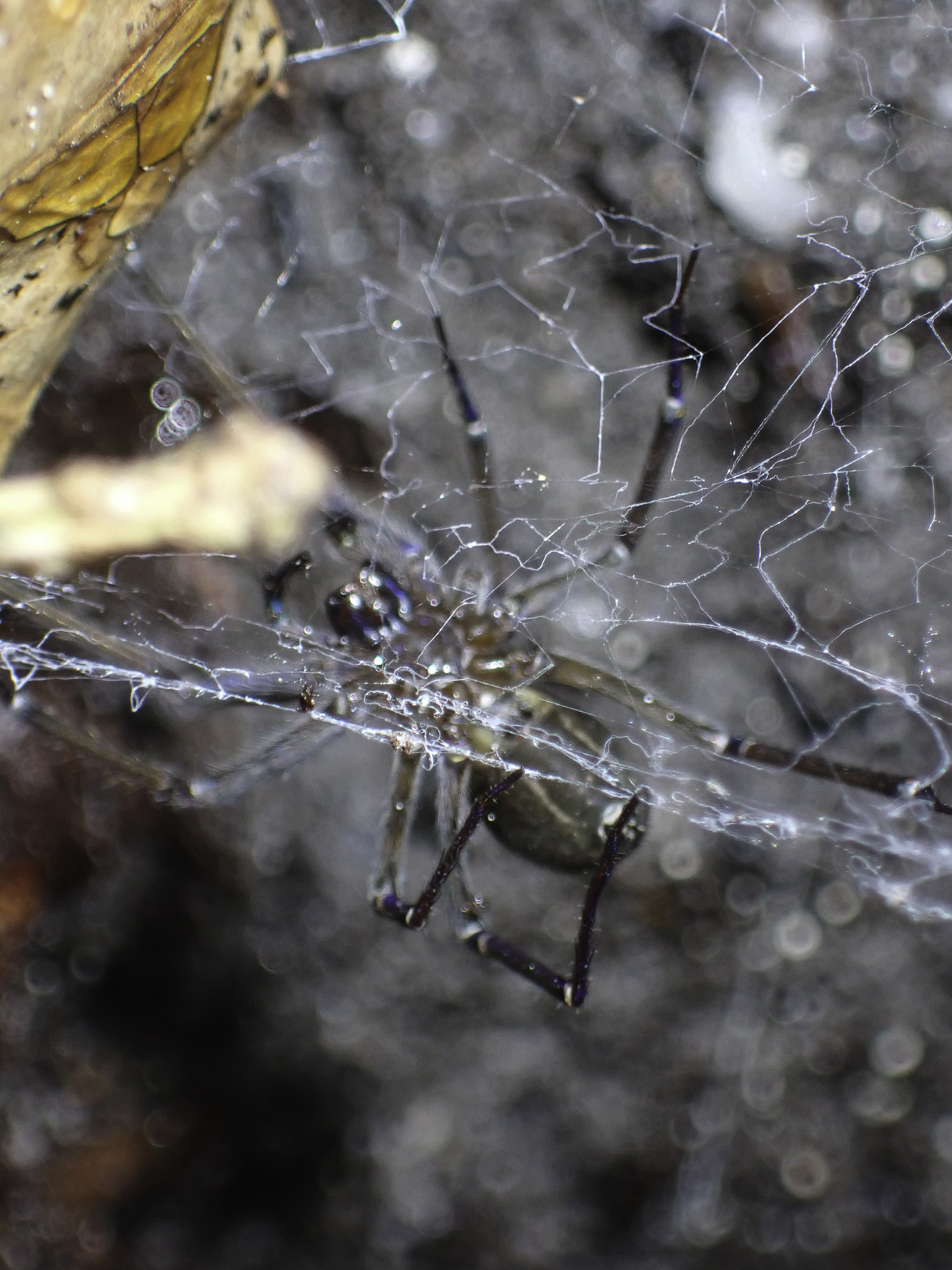

== Conservation ==
Malaika longipes is listed as Rare due to its restricted distribution. The species occurs within one of South Africa's large protected areas, the Table Mountain National Park, and is unlikely to face future threats. There are no significant threats to the species.

== Taxonomy ==
The species was originally described by Purcell in 1904 as Auximus longipes from Devil's Peak in Table Mountain National Park. It was subsequently described as Haemilla grindleyi by Lawrence in 1964 and transferred to Phyxelida by Brignoli in 1983 before being placed in its current genus and synonymized by Griswold in 1990. Malaika longipes is the type species of the genus Malaika.
