= Duren Sawit (kelurahan) =

Duren Sawit, Duren Sawit
- Kelurahan
- Location within Jakarta
- Coordinates: 6°13′51.3″S 106°54′52.7″E
- Country: Indonesia
- Province: Jakarta
- City: East Jakarta
- District: Duren Sawit

Area
  - Total: 4.55 km^{2} (1.76 sq mi)

Population (2016)
  - Total: 69,517
  - Density: 15,300/km^{2} (39,600/sq mi)

Duren Sawit is a village (kelurahan) of Duren Sawit, East Jakarta, Indonesia. The village is also the seat of administration of the Duren Sawit district. It has a population of just under 70,000 in 2016, making it the fourth most populated village in the district.

It was previously part of the Jatinegara district until 1990, when a presidential decree created the Duren Sawit district.
