= Duren Sawit =

Coordinates: 6.2352°S 106.9159°E

Duren Sawit is a district (kecamatan) of East Jakarta, Indonesia. The rough boundaries of Duren Sawit are I Gusti Ngurah Rai road to the north, Kali Sunter to the west, and Kali Malang to the south. The district borders the districts of Jatinegara to the west, Cakung and Pulo Gadung to the north, and Makasar to the south, and Bekasi to the east.

Duren Sawit was part of Jatinegara district until 1990. The district of Duren Sawit was established with the issuance of Presidential Decree No. 60 year 1990.

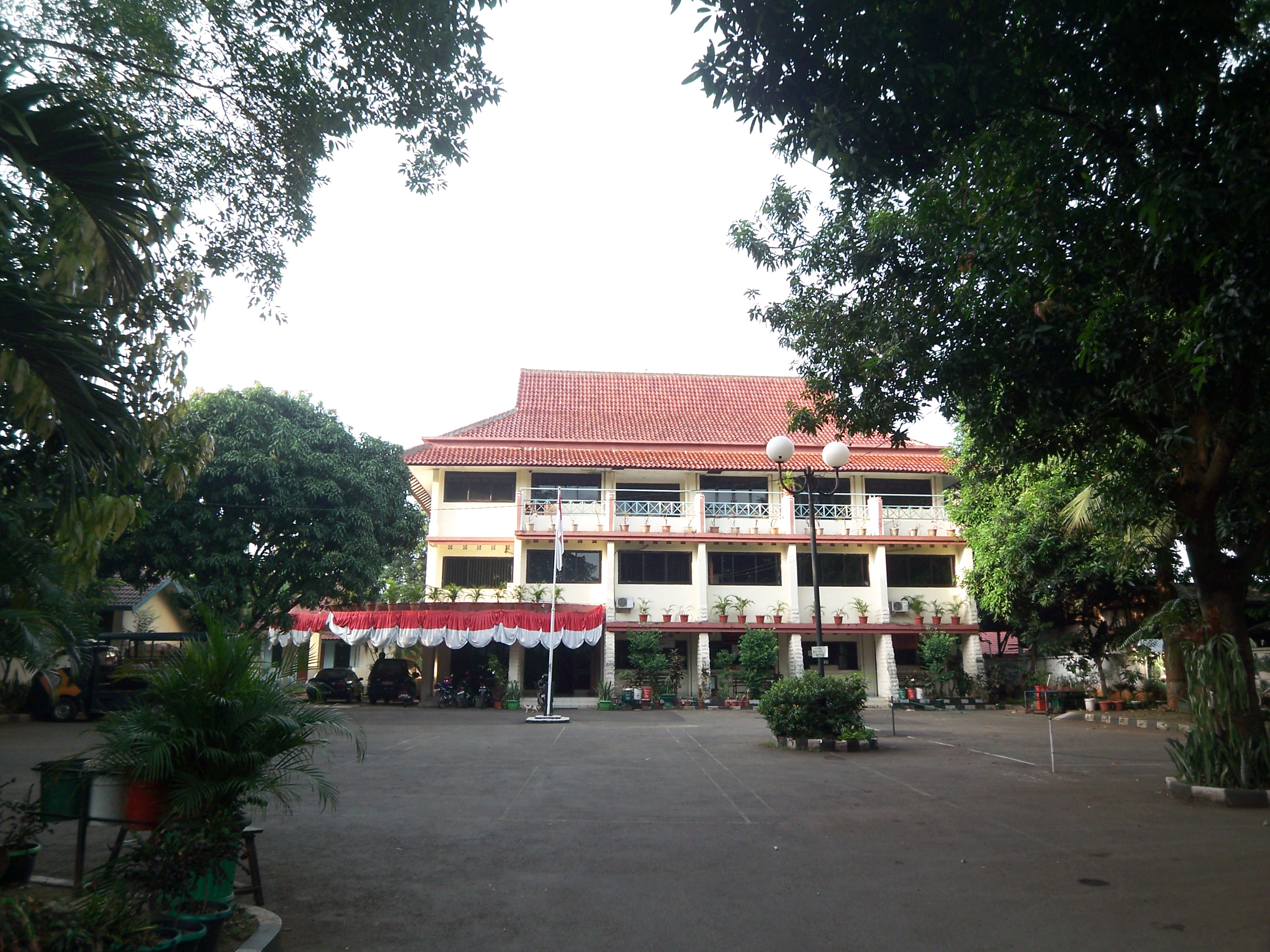
Administrative Village Building of Pondok Kelapa

== Administrative divisions ==
Duren Sawit district is divided into seven Kelurahan or urban villages:

- Pondok Bambu - area code - 13430
- Duren Sawit - area code - 13440
- Pondok Kelapa - area code - 13450
- Pondok Kopi - area code - 13460
- Malaka Jaya - area code - 13460
- Malaka Sari - area code - 13460
- Klender - area code - 13470
