= Pondok Kopi =

Village in East Jakarta, Indonesia

Pondok Kopi is a village (kelurahan) of Duren Sawit, East Jakarta, Indonesia.
