= Maleki, Sistan and Baluchestan =

Maleki ملكي
- Village
- Location within Iran
- Coordinates: 31°05′26″N 61°42′41″E
- Country: Iran
- Province: Sistan and Baluchestan
- County: Hirmand
- Bakhsh: Central
- Rural District: Margan

Population (2006)
  - Total: 280
- Time zone: UTC+3:30 (IRST)
  - Summer (DST): UTC+4:30 (IRDT)

Maleki (Persian: ملكي, also Romanized as Malekī; also known as Deh-e Malekī) is a village in Margan Rural District, in the Central District of Hirmand County, Sistan and Baluchestan Province, Iran. At the 2006 census, its population was 280, in 48 families.
