= Tahirli, Yardymli =

Tahirli
- Municipality
- Location within Azerbaijan
- Coordinates: 38°57′N 48°20′E
- Country: Azerbaijan
- Rayon: Yardymli

Population
  - Total: 522
- Time zone: UTC+4 (AZT)
  - Summer (DST): UTC+5 (AZT)

Tahirli (also, Tairli) is a village and municipality in the Yardymli Rayon of Azerbaijan. It has a population of 522. The municipality consists of the villages of Tahirli and Məlikli.
