= Telman Malikov =

Azerbaijani scientist

Telman Malikov (born January 5, 1950, in Baku) is an Azerbaijani scientist. He is a professor at Azerbaijan National Academy of Sciences Institute of Mathematics and Mechanics.

== Early life ==
In 1972, Malikov graduated in mechanics and mathematics at Azerbaijan State University (now Baku State University (BSU)) with an honors diploma. That year, he went to Ganja State University (GSU) as a teacher. From December 1972 to 1975, he was a postgraduate at BSU. From 1976 to 1977 he worked at GSU. From 1977 to 2013 he worked at Azerbaijan Technology University in Ganja. From 1990 to 2005, he was a manager of the Higher Mathematics Department. From 2000 to 2013, he was rector of Azerbaijan Technology University. Starting in 2014, he began work at the University of Mathematics and Mechanics of Azerbaijan National Academy of Sciences.

== Research ==
In 1972, Malikov entered postgraduate study at Azerbaijan State University. In 1976, he defended his dissertation on "The research of intrinsic processes in optimum systems" on "Differential and Integral equations". He earned the degree of physical-mathematics sciences.

In 2005, he defended his thesis on a "Discrete Mathematics and Mathematical Cybernetics", on the topic of "Necessary conditions for optimality in some of optimal management processes".

Malikov studied optimal management following the work of Q. T. Ahmadov, associate member of Azerbaijan National Academy of Sciences.

Malikov suggested new methods to obtain the necessary conditions for optimality in described processes with simple equations, integrodifferential equations, Goursat-Darboux and acted equations. His methods give an opportunity for optimality in some problems that were impossible to explore (for example, in processes with neutral type equations) and to obtain necessary conditions for optimality of special management in necessary conditions and different meanings. He authored more than 80 articles, 2 textbooks, 3 monographs, and crafted more than 10 inventions and patents. His scientific works were published in Russia, US, UK and in scientific journals.

Malikov led scientific investigators and advised doctoral candidates. In 2002, he was awarded with the "Gold Medal" of the French Association for industry for his achievements in education. He was a member of the defence council of doctors and candidates of sciences on Discrete Mathematics and Mathematical Cybernetics of Cybernetic Institute of Azerbaijan National Academy of Sciences.
