= Melik Raisian =

Georgian economist and politician

- Born: April 11, 1961 (age 65); Akhalkalaki, Georgian SSR, USSR
- Citizenship: Georgian
- Education: Yerevan Institute of Public Economy

Melik Raisian (born April 11, 1961, in Akhalkalaki) is a Georgian economist and politician.

He graduated from the Department of Financial Accounting of the Yerevan Institute of Public Economy. In 1995–1999, he was a member of the Parliament of the 4th convocation of Georgia (majority), from the "Union of Georgian Citizens" electoral block. From 1999 to 2004 he was a member of the Parliament of the 5th convocation of Georgia (Akhalkalaki majority), from the same electoral block. In 2004–2008 – a member of the Parliament of the 6th convocation of Georgia with a party list, from the "National Movement – Democrats" electoral bloc.

In the 2020 Georgian parliamentary election, the "United National Movement" and the united opposition presented "Strength in unity" as the candidate for the majority in the Akhalkalaki-Ninotsminda electoral district. He received 4.04% (1,251) of the vote and finished fifth.
