= Sarab-e Maleki =

Sarab-e Maleki سرابملكي
- Village
- Location within Iran
- Coordinates: 33°40′26″N 48°30′46″E
- Country: Iran
- Province: Lorestan
- County: Khorramabad
- Bakhsh: Bayravand
- Rural District: Beyranvand-e Shomali

Population (2006)
  - Total: 111
- Time zone: UTC+3:30 (IRST)
  - Summer (DST): UTC+4:30 (IRDT)

Sarab-e Maleki (Persian: سرابملكي, also Romanized as Sarāb-e Malekī, Sarāb-e Melkī, Sarv-e Malekī, and Sarvmaliki) is a village in Beyranvand-e Shomali Rural District, Bayravand District, Khorramabad County, Lorestan Province, Iran. At the 2006 census, its population was 111, in 23 families.
