= Malaki, Hormozgan =

Malaki ملكي
- Village
- Location within Iran
- Coordinates: 26°45′33″N 55°41′34″E
- Country: Iran
- Province: Hormozgan
- County: Qeshm
- Bakhsh: Shahab
- Rural District: Salakh

Population (2006)
  - Total: 193
- Time zone: UTC+3:30 (IRST)
  - Summer (DST): UTC+4:30 (IRDT)

Malaki (Persian: ملكي, also Romanized as Malakī and Malekī) is a village in Salakh Rural District, Shahab District, Qeshm County, Hormozgan Province, Iran. At the 2006 census, its population was 193, in 45 families.
