= Malaka Jaya =

Subdistrict in East Jakarta City, Jakarta, Indonesia

Malaka Jaya is a village (kelurahan) of Duren Sawit, East Jakarta, Indonesia.
