= Maleki (surname) =

Maleki is a surname. Notable people with the surname include:

- Christopher Maleki (born 1964), American actor
- Iman Maleki (born 1976), Iranian painter
- Khalil Maleki (1903–1969), Iranian political figure
- Mohammad Maleki (1934–2020), Iranian academic
- Mojtaba Maleki (born 1983), Iranian strongman and powerlifter
- Mojtaba Maleki (born 2002), Iranian AI Engineer and Computer Scientist
