= Məlikli, Qabala =

Məlikli
- Municipality
- Location within Azerbaijan Location within Shaki-Zagatala Economic Region
- Coordinates: 40°48′01″N 47°50′40″E
- Country: Azerbaijan
- Rayon: Qabala

Population
  - Total: 560
- Time zone: UTC+4 (AZT)
  - Summer (DST): UTC+5 (AZT)

Məlikli (also, Melikli) is a village and municipality in the Qabala Rayon of Azerbaijan. It has a population of 560.
