= Məlikli, Zardab =

Məlikli
- Municipality
- Location within Azerbaijan
- Coordinates: 40°12′47″N 47°31′47″E
- Country: Azerbaijan
- Rayon: Zardab

Population
  - Total: 1,745
- Time zone: UTC+4 (AZT)
  - Summer (DST): UTC+5 (AZT)

Məlikli (also, Melikli) is a village and municipality in the Zardab Rayon of Azerbaijan. It has a population of 1,745.
