= Tahirli, Jalilabad =

Village and municipality in Azerbaijan

Tahirli is a village and municipality in the Jalilabad Rayon of Azerbaijan. It has a population of 367.
