= Bani Kinanah district =

Bani Kinanah District لواء بني كنانة
- District
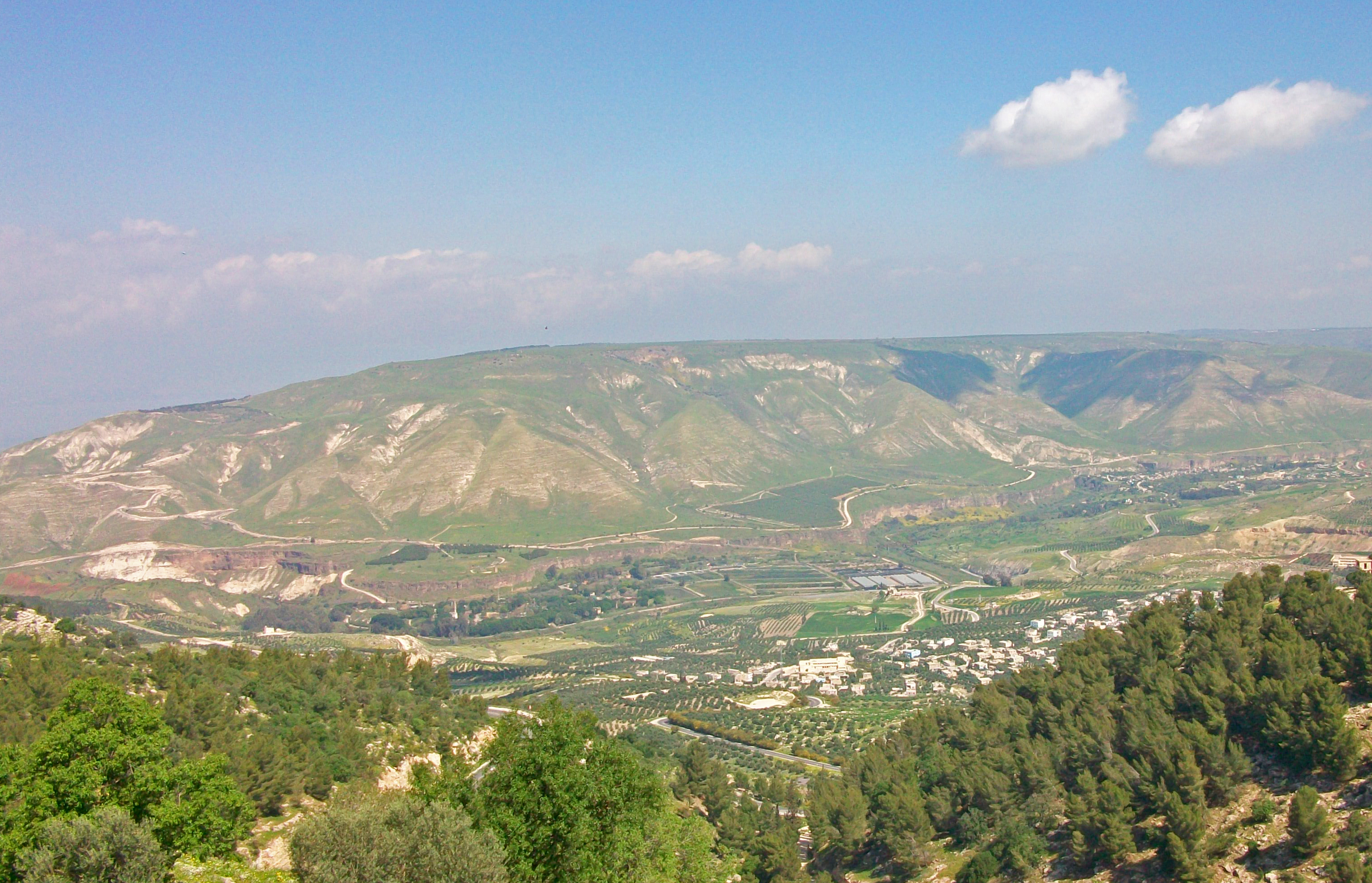
- A view of Al-Himma in the Jordan Valley of Bani Kinanah District

- Location within Jordan
- Coordinates: 32°38′48″N 35°41′00″E
- Country: Jordan
- Governorate: Irbid Governorate
- Administrative Center: Sama al-Rousan

Area
  - Total: 252.9 km^{2} (97.6 sq mi)

Population (2015 census)
  - Total: 131,797
- Time zone: GMT +2
  - Summer (DST): +3
- Area code: +962(2)

Bani Kinanah District (Arabic: لواء بني كنانة) is one of the nine districts that constitute the Irbid Governorate of Jordan. It has a population of over 130,000. Its administrative center is in Sama al-Rousan. There are five municipal councils in the district, many educational, and service institutions. The district is served by the Yarmouk Hospital. It's named after the Arabic clan of Kinana which is one of the oldest known Arabian clans since pre-Islamic era that still reside in the area.

== Geography ==
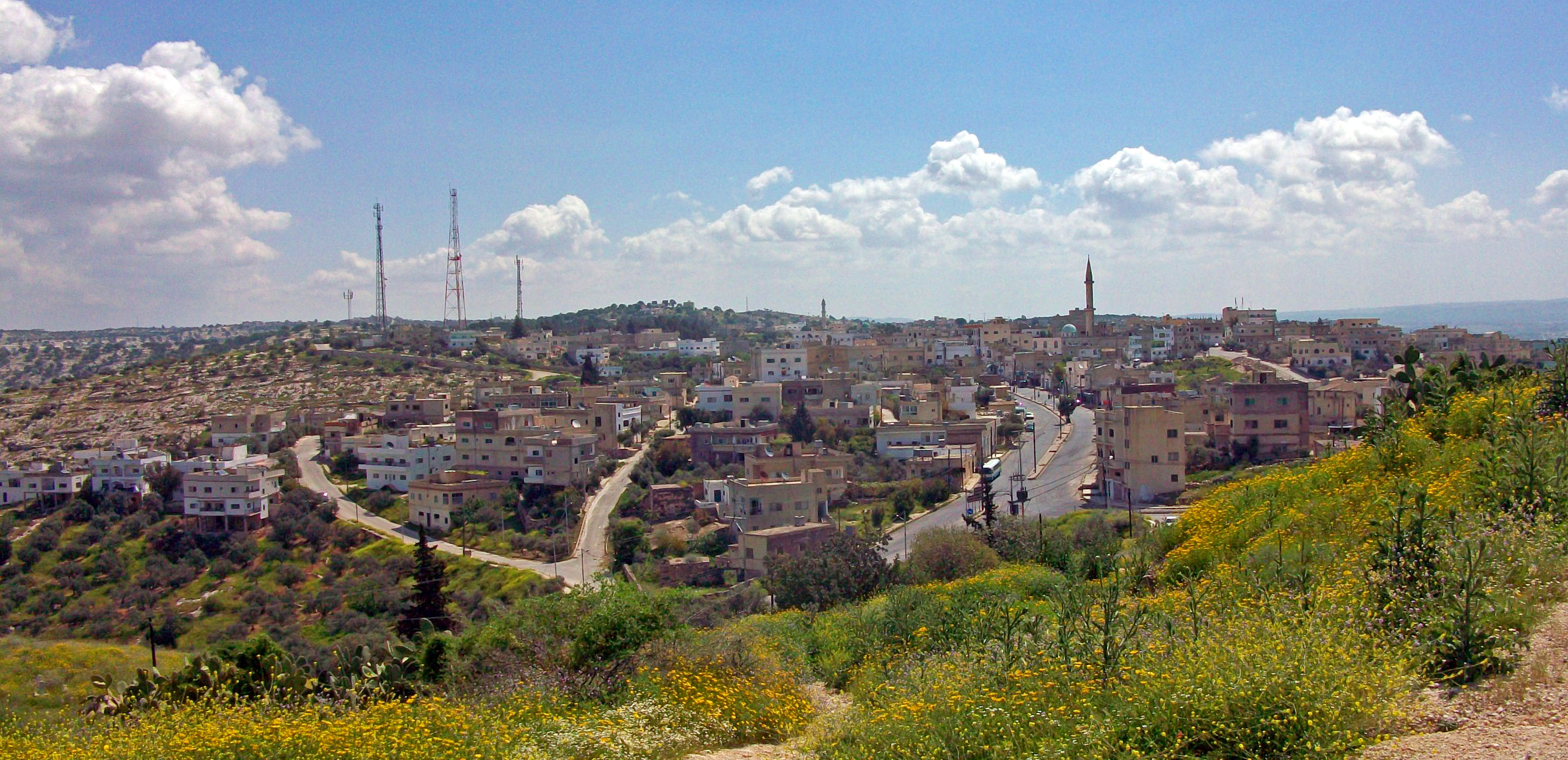
The town of Umm Qais in Bani Kinanah District

The Bani Kinanah District is situated in the north-western edge of Jordan overlooking the Sea of Galilee. It is one of the nine districts of Irbid Governorate.

The Bani Kinanah district has the largest lake in the north of Jordan, called Al-Arayes Pond.
