= Muna, Nepal =

Muna, Nepal मुना
- Village development committee
- Location in Nepal Muna, Nepal (Nepal)
- Coordinates: 28.50°N 83.32°E
- Country: Nepal
- Zone: Dhaulagiri Zone
- District: Myagdi District

Population (1991)
  - Total: 2,152
- Time zone: UTC+5:45 (Nepal Time)

Muna, Nepal is a village development committee in Myagdi District in the Dhaulagiri Zone of western-central Nepal. At the time of the 1991 Nepal census it had a population of 2152 people living in 456 individual households.
