= Malak =

Mal'ak (also spelled Malak, Melek) may refer to:

- Malak, Northern Territory a suburb in the City of Darwin, Australia
- Mal'ak Elohim or angel of the Lord
- Darth Malak, a character from the fictional Star Wars universe
- Malak (given name)
- Malak (surname)
- Malak (title), administrative title in the Horn of Africa

== See also ==
- Angels in Judaism
- Angels in Islam
- Malach (disambiguation)
- Malik (disambiguation)
- Malaka (disambiguation)
- Melek (disambiguation)
- Malaika (disambiguation)
