= Maleki, Khuzestan =

Maleki مالكي
- Village
- Location within Iran
- Coordinates: 30°42′34″N 48°38′29″E
- Country: Iran
- Province: Khuzestan
- County: Shadegan
- Bakhsh: Central
- Rural District: Jaffal

Population (2006)
  - Total: 1,638
- Time zone: UTC+3:30 (IRST)
  - Summer (DST): UTC+4:30 (IRDT)

Maleki (Persian: مالكي, also Romanized as Mālekī) is a village in Jaffal Rural District, in the Central District of Shadegan County, Khuzestan Province, Iran. At the 2006 census, its population was 1,638, in 181 families.
