= Aliabad-e Maleki =

Aliabad-e Maleki علي اباد مالكي
- Village
- Country: Iran
- Province: South Khorasan
- County: Nehbandan
- Bakhsh: Shusef
- Rural District: Shusef

Population (2006)
  - Total: 47
- Time zone: UTC+3:30 (IRST)
  - Summer (DST): UTC+4:30 (IRDT)

Aliabad-e Maleki (Persian: علي اباد مالكي, also Romanized as ‘Alīābād-e Māleḵī) is a village in Shusef Rural District, Shusef District, Nehbandan County, South Khorasan Province, Iran. At the 2006 census, its population was 47, in 9 families.
