= Bollywood Art Project =

Indian urban art project

Bollywood Art Project (BAP) is an urban art project started in 2012 in Mumbai, India in memoir of popular Hindi Cinema of Bollywood. It is the brainchild of artist Ranjit Dahiya and is aimed at mapping the cinematic history of Bollywood over the last century.

== Inspiration ==
The city of Mumbai is synonymous with Bollywood. However, there is little visual presence of Bollywood in the city apart from the upcoming film banners and hoardings. The corporate advertisements and political content has taken over most of the display areas and there is little or no trace left of the movie-town it was.

Through this initiative, BAP wants to revisit the rich culture of Bollywood and bring Bollywood out onto the streets, and make it publicly accessible. Although it has started out with the medium of street art to affect a larger audience, it has the intent of opening up to various art forms also within public spaces.

== Ranjit Dahiya ==
Founder artist of BAP, Ranjit Dahiya is originally from a small town named Sonipat in Haryana, India. He did his bachelor's degree in fine art from College of Art, Chandigarh, and further went on to do his postgraduate in graphic design from the National Institute of Design, Ahmedabad. He had over 8 years of experience in various kind of communication design projects in the industry as well as his own startup, Digital Moustache. Dahiya was always passionate about street art and hand painted Bollywood Posters and has been engaged with this theme of work for 18 years.

In 2009, Dahiya's poster of the film 'Sarkar Raj' represented Bollywood at the event Salon du Cinema at Paris, inaugurated by Amitabh Bachchan. His work 'History of Bollywood', a collection of paintings of Indian film posters, was exhibited at La Rochelle, France, during the 32nd International Festival, where he also painted a community mural (32 ft x 18 ft). 'History of Bollywood' was also featured as an exhibition at Durban, South Africa, for the 28th International Film Festival.

== Timeline ==
This project was initiated by Ranjit Dahiya. The murals will be made on walls people's houses of Bandra suburb of Mumbai. The first ever mural made is a poster from a 1953 film Anarkali and is of 20 feet (6.1 m). Bollywood actors and actresses have given permission to paint their houses which are located here.
