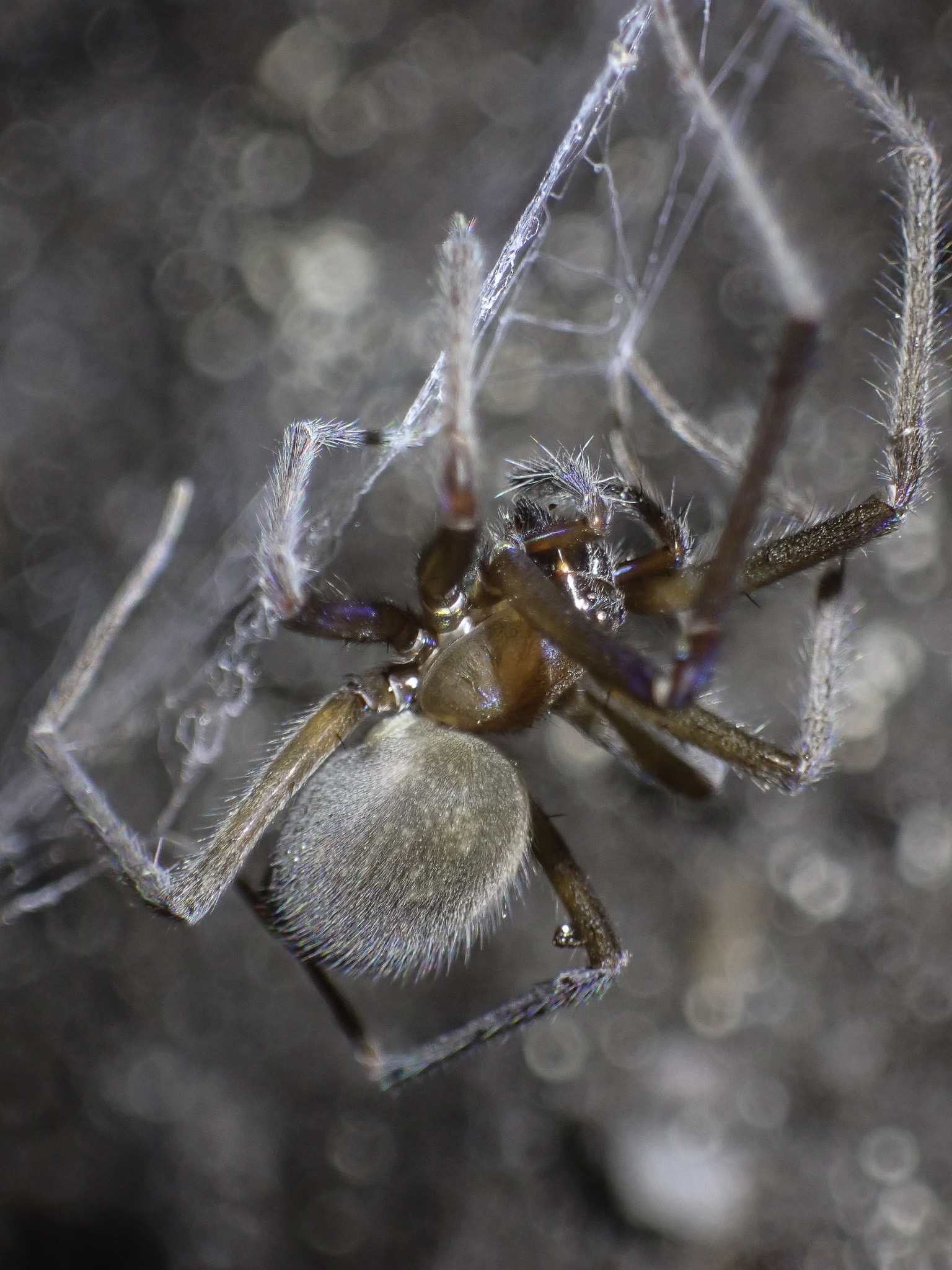
- M. longipes
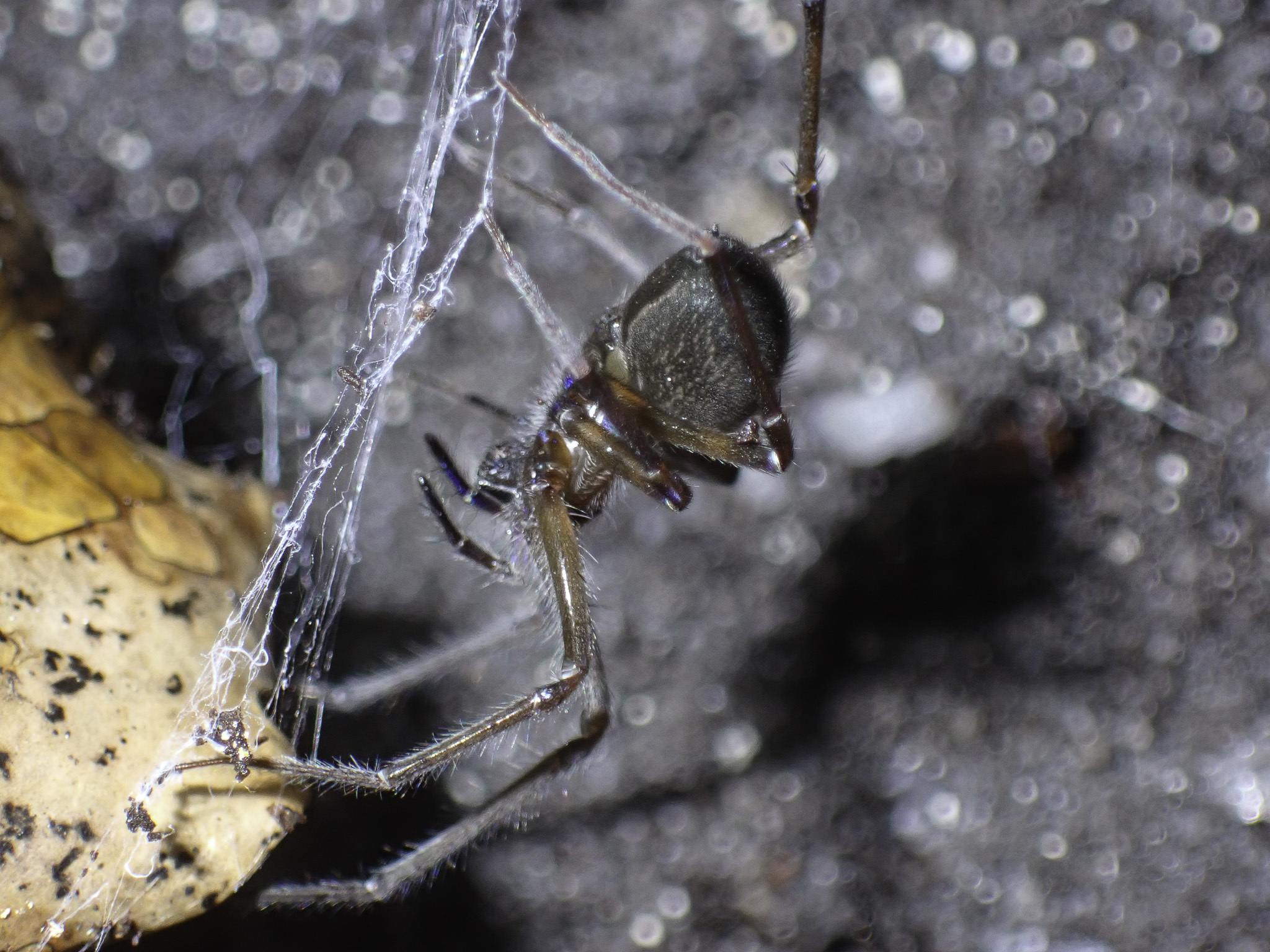
- M. longipes

Scientific classification
- Kingdom: Animalia
- Phylum: Arthropoda
- Subphylum: Chelicerata
- Class: Arachnida
- Order: Araneae
- Infraorder: Araneomorphae
- Family: Phyxelididae
- Genus: Malaika; Lehtinen, 1967

Type species
- M. longipes (Purcell, 1904)

Species
- M. delicatula Griswold, 1990; M. longipes (Purcell, 1904)

= Malaika (spider) =

Genus of spiders

Malaika is a genus of South African araneomorph spiders in the family Phyxelididae, and was first described by Pekka T. Lehtinen in 1967.

== Species ==
As of September 2025 this genus contains two described species, found only in South Africa:

- Malaika delicatula Griswold, 1990
- Malaika longipes (Purcell, 1904)
