= Malaika (name) =

Malaika is a female given name.

People with the name include:

- Malaika Arora, Indian actress, dancer, model and television personality
- Malaika Firth, Kenyan-born British model
- Malaika Griffin, Anti-white racist convicted of the 1999 murder of Jason Patrick Horsley
- Malaika Rapolu, American tennis player
- Malaika Vaz, Indian TV presenter and wildlife filmmaker
