= Melek Delilbaşı =

Turkish byzantinist (1947–2022)

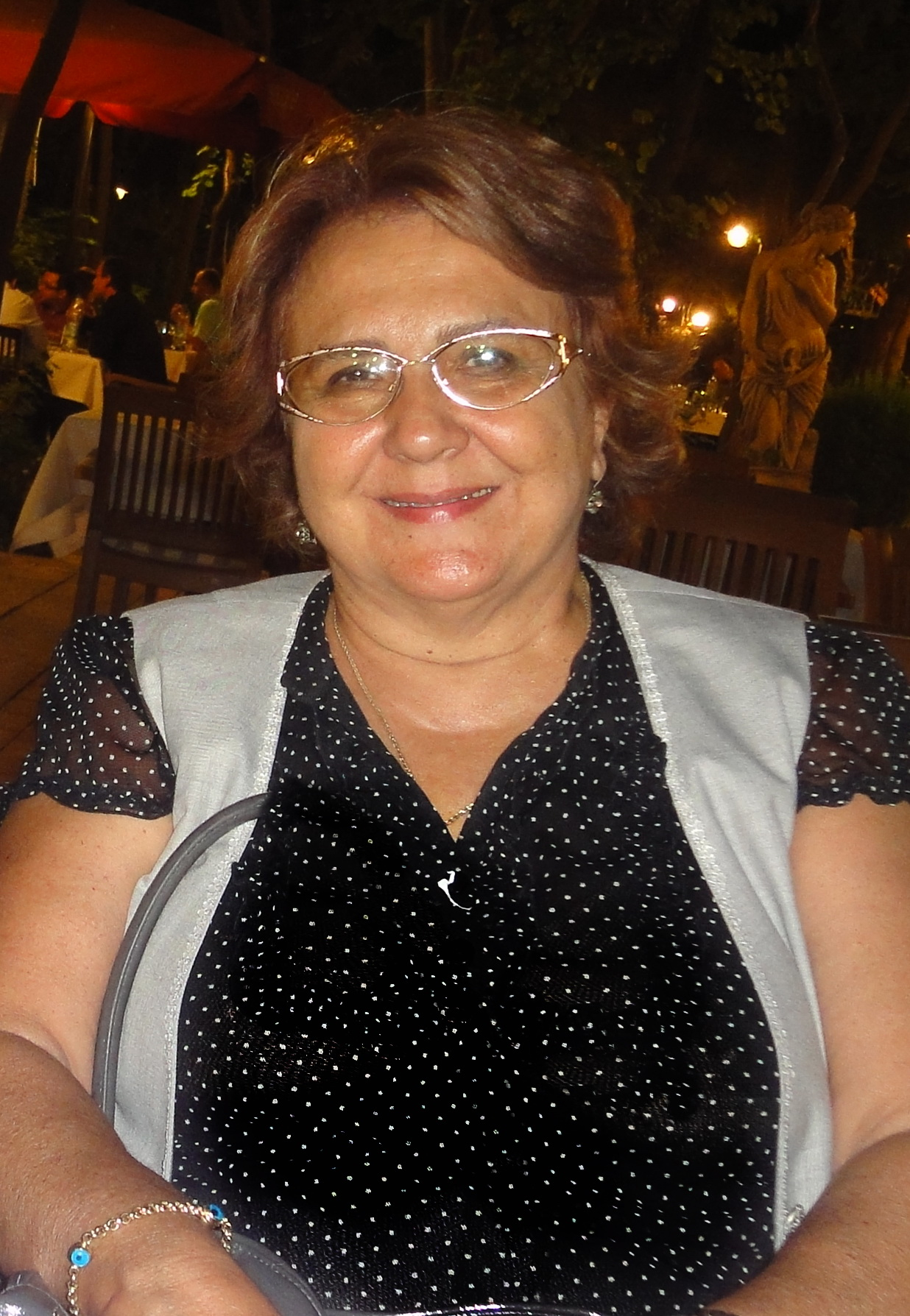
- Born: 12 July 1947; Istanbul, Turkey
- Died: 27 October 2022 (aged 75); Istanbul, Turkey

Academic work
- Discipline: Ottoman and Byzantine history
- Institutions: Ankara University

Melek Delilbaşı (12 July 1947 – 27 October 2022) was a Turkish historian of the Ottoman and Byzantine empires. She was Dean of the Faculty of Language, History and Geography of Ankara University.

== Education ==
Delilbaşı was educated at Şişli College and Çamlıca Girls' High School in Istanbul. In 1964 she joined Department of History at Ankara University and completed her undergraduate degree in 1968. In March 1973, she received her doctorate for a thesis J.Anagnostis: Sultan II.Murad Dönemine Ait Bir Bizans Kaynağı ('J. Anagnostis: a Byzantine source from the period of Sultan Murad II'). Subsequently, Delilbaşı undertook research for her habilitation at King's College London and the British Museum.

== Career ==
Delilbaşı became Associate Professor in 1980, and was promoted to Professor in November 1988. During the 1980s and 90s she held several fellowships at the Dumbarton Oaks Byzantine Studies program in Washington, D.C.. In 1990, she founded the Department of Modern Greek Language and Literature. Delilbaşı was Dean of the Faculty of Language, History and Geography of Ankara University from 1995 until 2001. She was director of the Center for Ottoman Studies from 2005 until 2009. Delilbaşı's personal library was donated to the ANAMED branch of the Koç University Suna Kıraç Library in 2018.

== Publications ==
- (1983). Ortaçağ’da Türk Hükümdarları Tarafından Batılılara Ahidnamelerle Verilen İmtiyazlara Genel Bir Bakış. BELLETEN, 47(185), 95–104. https://doi.org/10.37879/ttkbelleten.1134185
- (1987). Selânik ve Yanya’da Osmanlı Egemenliğinin Kurulması. BELLETEN, 51(199), 75–101. https://doi.org/10.37879/belleten.1987.75
- (1997). 1564 Tarihli Mufassal Yanya Livası Tahrir Defterine Göre Yanya Kenti ve Köyleri. Belgeler, 17(21), 1-40. https://izlik.org/JA49CK44SB
- with İnalcık, H., & Zachariadou, E. A. (2013). İki İmparatorluk tek coğrafya : Bizans’tan Osmanlı’ya geçişin Anadolu ve Balkanlar’daki izleri (1. baskı). Ithaki. ISBN 9786053752998
