= Malika (given name) =

- Pronunciation: Arabic: [maː.lɪk] "Ma-Lee-Ka"
- Gender: Female

Origin
- Origin: Arabic or Greenlandic (unrelated)
- Meaning: Owner (مَالِك); King (مَلِك); Ocean wave (Greenlandic)

Malika is the Arabic word for 'queen' and the feminine form of the name Malik.

== Given name ==
- Judith Malika Liberman (born 1978), French storyteller, writer and teacher
- Malika or al-Nadirah, princess of Hatra per Perso-Arabic traditions
- Malika al-Fassi (1919–2007), Moroccan writer
- Malika Amar Sheikh (born 1957), Marathi Indian writer
- Malika Andrews (born 1995), American sports journalist
- Malika Askari, Indian actress, sister of actress Mumtaz
- Malika Ayane (born 1984), Italian singer
- Malika Benarab-Attou (born 1963), French politician
- Malika Dahlan, a fictional character from the British soap opera Doctors
- Malika El Aroud (born 1960), Moroccan internet Islamist living in Belgium
- Malika Kalontarova (born 1950), Tajik American dancer
- Malika Kishwar (1803–1858), queen of Awadh
- Malika Louback, Djiboutian-French fashion model and engineer
- Malika Ménard (born 1987), Miss France 2010
- Malika Mokeddem (born 1949), Algerian writer
- Malika Oufkir (born 1953), Moroccan writer
- Malika Pukhraj (1912–2004), Pakistani singer
- Malika Tahir, French figure skater
- Malika-e-Tarranum, honorific of Noor Jehan (1926–2000), singer from British India and later Pakistan
- Malika Tirolien (born 1983), Guadeloupean-born singer-songwriter living in Montréal
- Malika Zarra, Moroccan singer
- Nia-Malika Henderson, American journalist
- Princess Lalla Malika of Morocco (1933–2021), Moroccan princess

== See also ==
- Mallika, given name
