= Maalik (film) =

Maalik, the name of an angel in Islam, is the title of the following films:

- Maalik (1972 film), an Indian Hindi drama film
- Maalik (2016 film), a Pakistani political-thriller film
- Maalik (2025 film), a Hindi action thriller film
