= Milak, Qazvin =

Milak ميلك
- Village
- Location within Iran
- Coordinates: 36°35′49″N 50°12′05″E
- Country: Iran
- Province: Qazvin
- County: Qazvin
- Bakhsh: Alamut-e Gharbi
- Rural District: Rudbar-e Shahrestan

Population (2006)
  - Total: 64
- Time zone: UTC+3:30 (IRST)
  - Summer (DST): UTC+4:30 (IRDT)

Milak (Persian: ميلك, also Romanized as Mīlak) is a village in Rudbar-e Shahrestan Rural District, Alamut-e Gharbi District, Qazvin County, Qazvin Province, Iran. At the 2006 census, its population was 64, in 30 families.

== Notable people ==
- Yousef Alikhani, writer, born in Milak in 1975.
