= Məlikli, Yardymli =

Məlikli
- Location within Azerbaijan
- Coordinates: 38°57′N 48°19′E
- Country: Azerbaijan
- Rayon: Yardymli
- Municipality: Tahirli
- Time zone: UTC+4 (AZT)
  - Summer (DST): UTC+5 (AZT)

Məlikli (also, Melikli and Myalikli) is a village in the Yardymli Rayon of Azerbaijan. The village forms part of the municipality of Tahirli.
