= South Malaka =

Locality/township of Prayagraj, Uttar Pradesh, India

Coordinates: 25.440°N 81.845°E

South Malaka is a locality/township of Prayagraj, Uttar Pradesh, India. It is close to the railway track connecting Prayagraj to Varanasi and Gorakhpur. The other important institutions in the locality are Government Inter College and U.P.Government Central Library.
