= Château de Cabriès =

Castle in Provence-Alpes-Côte d'Azur, France

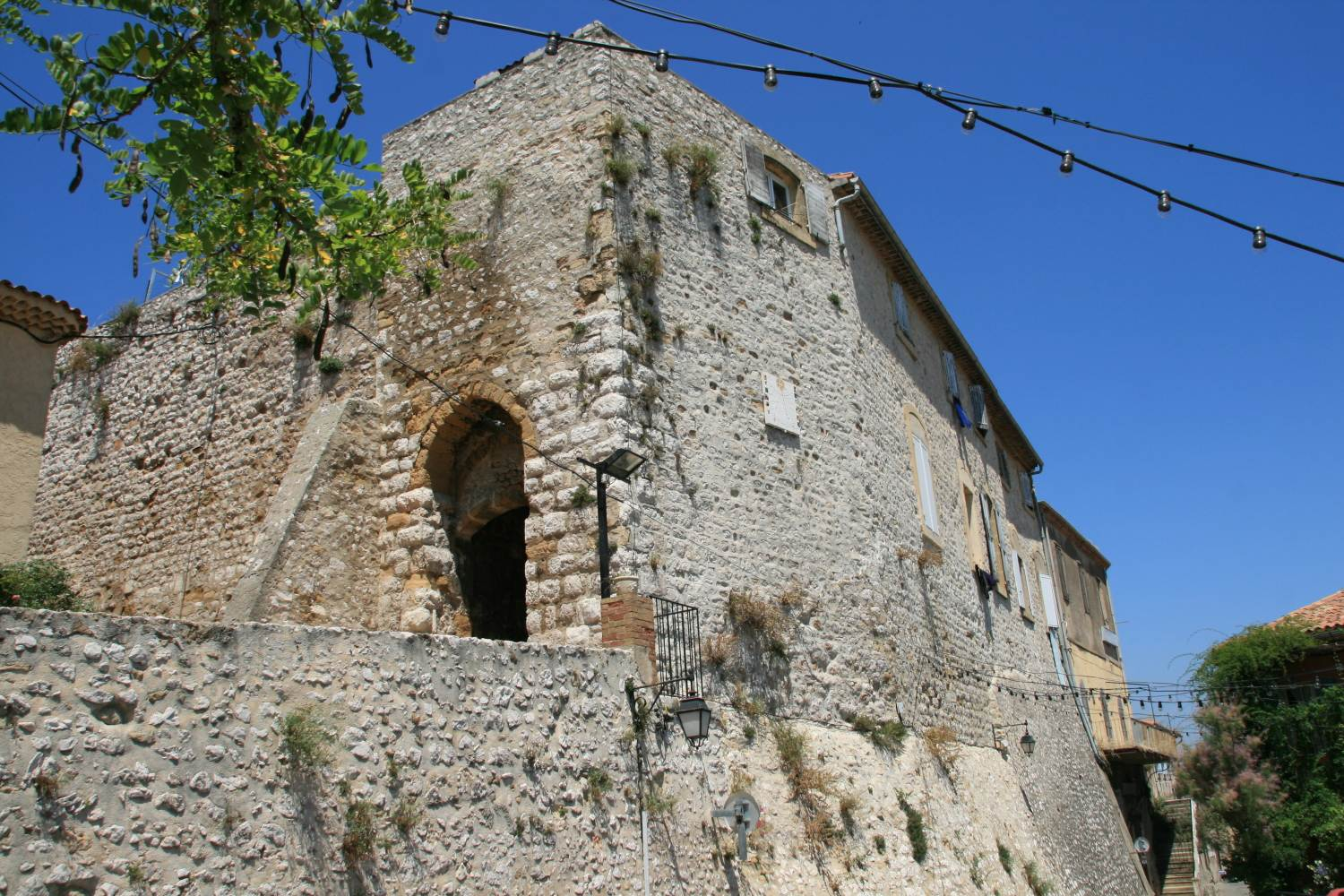
- The castle on the left
- Interactive map of the Château de Cabriès area

General information
- Coordinates: 43.4412°N 5.3791°E

The Château de Cabriès is an historic castle in Cabriès, Bouches-du-Rhône, Provence-Alpes-Côte d'Azur, France. It houses the Musée Edgar Mélik.

== History ==
The original castle was built in the 8th century, and a stone structure (castrum de Cabriera) was first documented in the Pergam list in 1200. The earliest known deed in the seigniorial history of Cabriès dates to 1237, when Anselme Férus sold the fiefdom and the castle to Ramon Berenguer IV, Count of Provence. The castle, which was a former stronghold for the Counts of Provence, was transformed into a residential estate in the 18th century, during which its exteriors were remodelled with French windows.

In 1934, the northern wing was acquired by the French painter Edgar Mélik (1904–1976). He painted murals on most of the interior walls and within the 17th-century chapel, and built a studio that offers an uninterrupted view of the Montagne Sainte-Victoire.

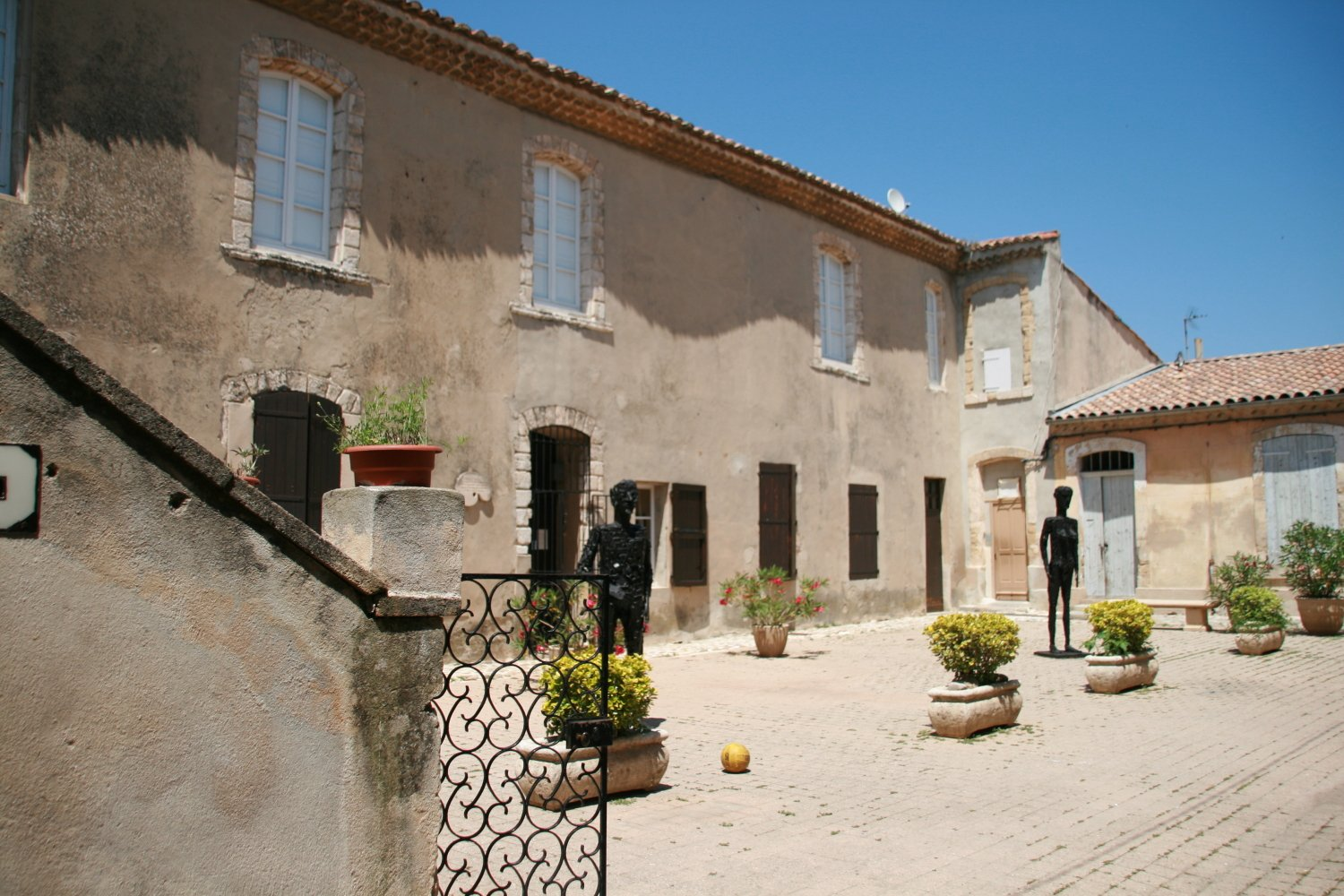
Château de Cabriès - courtyard

== Culture ==
The castle now houses the Musée Edgar Mélik, dedicated to the painter's collection. His extensive mural work throughout the building is considered unique within the region. Alongside Mélik's art, the museum hosts temporary exhibitions and displays a collection of local archaeological artifacts.
