= Melikgyugh =

Village in Aragatsotn, Armenia

Melikgyugh Մելիքգյուղ
- Location within Armenia Location within Aragatsotn
- Coordinates: 40°40′10″N 44°21′27″E
- Country: Armenia
- Province: Aragatsotn
- Municipality: Aparan

Population (2011)
  - Total: 999
- Time zone: UTC+4
  - Summer (DST): UTC+5

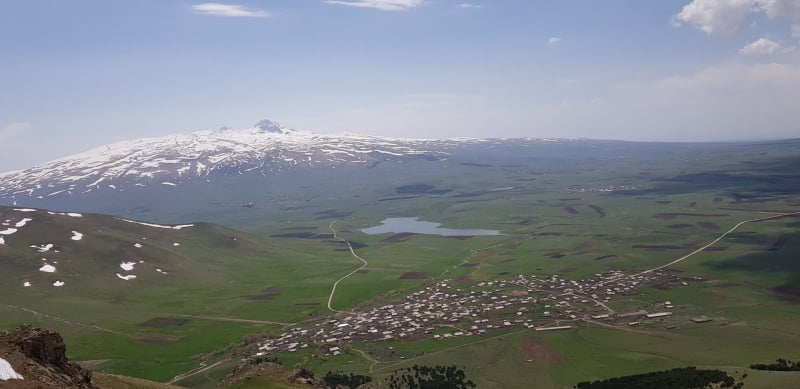

Melikgyugh (Armenian: Մելիքգյուղ) is a village in the Aparan Municipality of the Aragatsotn Province of Armenia.
