= Malaka Sari =

Urban village in East Jakarta City, Jakarta, Indonesia

Malaka Sari is a village (kelurahan) of Duren Sawit, East Jakarta, Indonesia.
