= Pondok Bambu =

Pondok Bambu is a village (kelurahan) of Duren Sawit, East Jakarta, Indonesia. Before the establishment of the Subdistrict Duren Sawit, the village is under the administration of the Subdistrict Jatinegara.
