= Mallika Badrinath =

Indian writer

- Born: Salem, Tamilnadu, India
- Occupations: food writer, cookbook author, TV chef
- Years active: 1989-present
- Website: www.mallikascookery.com

Mallika Badrinath is an Indian food writer, chef, cookbook author and host of cooking shows.

She is the author of 29 cookery books in English and 30 books in Tamil, together containing more than 4,000 recipes. Some of her books have been translated into Telugu, Kannada and Hindi. Her books include the Tamil “Siru Dhaniya Samayal” series, containing recipes using traditional nutritious ingredients and millets such as Sirudhaniyangal Ragi, kambu, Saamai, thinai, varagu, cholam and kudhiraivali.

== Early life ==
Born and brought up in Salem, a town in Tamilnadu, India, Mallika completed her Bachelors in Home Science from Salem. In the late 1980s, at the age of 21, she married Badrinath, a chartered accountant from Chennai. In an interview with The Hindu, she admitted to have rarely cooked before marriage as they lived in a large joint family of 25, and had a cook and an assistant cook to do the cooking. However, she was interested in recipes and collected them in a scrap book, writing all of them.

== Literary career ==
In Chennai, Mallika continued to cook and collect recipes. These included recipes that she had received from her mother and aunt, which she would rewrite into notebooks, with variations based on her experience. Soon, she had 10 such handwritten books, including 80 recipes for side dishes. Her husband encouraged her to publish these recipes, resulting in her first book "100 Vegetarian Recipes" published in 1988. As her books became popular she took up writing full-time, publishing later books through her own publishing house "Pradeep enterprises". Her husband, Badrinath, too reduced his work to help her market her books.

The 1990s saw an increase in access to cable television in India, however there were few cookery programs in regional language such asTamil. As a result, Mallika began to get offers for television shows on cookery, initially with Doordarshan and then with Sun TV.

Mallika says she tries to write one book per year.

== Other ventures ==
In 1999, Mallika started to market masalas (Indian cooking powders) under the company "Mallika Home Products", often known as MHP. She continues to write articles related to cooking in magazines including Kungumam, Kumudam, Mangaiyar Malar, Snegithi, Porpadham and Gokulam kadir. She has hosted cookery shows on Sun TV (Ungal Manasukku Pidichadhu Mattum), Jaya TV (“Arusuvai Neram”) where her shows have run for more than 15 years. She has also featured in cookery shows in Polimer TV and Sakthi TV-Sri Lanka. She hosts her own YouTube channel called "Mallika's cookery".

== Personal life ==
Mallika is married and lives in Chennai with her husband. They have two children, from whom they have three grandchildren.

== Awards ==
Mallika has received a number of awards including the “Priyadarshini Award” in 1998, which is given to women entrepreneurs in India. Her other awards include:

- “Mahila Ratna” Award - presented by the Tamil Nadu Arya Vysya Mahila Sabha in 1998
- “Arusuvai Gnaana Kalamani” Award presented by the Thenn Indhiya Samayal Kalaignargal Sangam
- “Acharya Award” in the field of cooking presented by Call Chennai in 2006
- “Best Cookery Show Host” Award presented by the Mylapore Academy in 2006
- “Arusuvai Arasi” Award presented by International Lions Clubs in 2008
- “Nala Maharani” conferred by Kungumam – Tamil magazine
- “Professional Excellence Award” by Rotary Club – Tirunagar & My Madurai
- “Sigaram Thotta Penmani” Award by Vijay TV on Women`s Day 2012
