= Elene Tevdoradze =

Georgian politician (born 1938)

Elene Tevdoradze Order of Honor
- ელენე თევდორაძე

President of the State Forgiveness Commission
- In office 2004–2013
- President: Giorgi Margvelashvili
- Succeeded by: Aleko Elisashvili

Member of the Parliament
- In office 1995–2008

Personal details
- Born: September 5, 1938 (age 88) Tbilisi, Georgia SSR, Soviet Union
- Party: Komsomol; Union of Citizens of Georgia (1993-2003); United National Movement (since 2003)
- Education: Institute of Foreign Languages of Tbilisi

Elene Tevdoradze (Georgian: ელენე თევდორაძე; born 5 September 1938), is a Georgian politician, teacher, and former member of the Parliament of Georgia.

== Biography ==
Tevdoradze was born in Tbilisi on 5 September 1938. She graduated from the Faculty of German Language and Literature at the Institute of Foreign Languages of Tbilisi in 1960. From 1962 to 1963, she was a secondary school teacher in the city of Rustavi, and became the local leader of Komsomol from 1963 to 1965. In 1972, Tevdoradze was named deputy principal of Tbilisi School No. 3 and became the principal of 90th School of Tbilisi in 1975.

Tevdoradze was a member of the Union of Citizens of Georgia party from 1993 until its dissolution in 2003. Since then, she has been a member of the UNM. She was member of the Parliament of Georgia from 1995 to 2008, and served as the president of the State Commission of Forgiveness from 2004 to 2013. She was also the Deputy Minister for Reintregation Affairs in 2004.

In 2008, Tevdoradze received the Order of Honor for her personal contribution towards parliamentary development and the protection of human rights in Georgia.
