= Malika Bota =

Coordinates: 29°26′N 82°4′E

Malika Bota मालिका बोटा
- Municipality
- Interactive map of Malika Bota
- Country: Nepal
- Zone: Karnali Zone
- District: Jumla District

Population (1991)
  - Total: 1,318
- Time zone: UTC+5:45 (Nepal Time)

Malika Bota is a village development committee in Jumla District in the Karnali Zone of north-western Nepal. At the time of the 1991 Nepal census it had a population of 1318 persons living in 178 individual households.
