= Malach =

Malach or Malakh may refer to:

- Angel (Judaism): malach/malakh is the word for angel in Hebrew
- Malachim (Hasidic group) associated to Chabad
- Malachim, alphabet created in the 16th century and derived from the Hebrew and Greek alphabets
- Malach, organization of Israeli Sign Language interpreters

== People ==
- Bob Malach (born 1954), American jazz saxophonist
- Chaim Avraham Dov Ber Levine HaCohen (died 1938), known as "the Malach"
- John Malach Shaw (1931–1999), United States federal judge
- Kathleen Malach (1926–2011), All-American Girls Professional Baseball League player
- Lorraine Malach (1933–2003), Canadian ceramic artist

== See also ==
- Malak (disambiguation)
  - Malak, see Angels in Islam
- Malachi
