= Məlikli, Agdam =

Məlikli
- Location within Azerbaijan Location within Karabakh Economic Region
- Coordinates: 40°06′17″N 46°45′43″E
- Country: Azerbaijan
- District: Aghdara
- Time zone: UTC+4 (AZT)
  - Summer (DST): UTC+5 (AZT)

Məlikli (Malikli, formerly, Maniklu and Adıgözəlbəyli) is a village in the Aghdara District of Azerbaijan. The village had an Azerbaijani-majority prior to their expulsion during the First Nagorno-Karabakh war.
