= Melek =

Melek may refer to:

== People ==
=== Given name ===
- Melek Amet (1960–2008), Romanian model
- Melek Sina Baydur (born 1948), Turkish retired diplomat and former Ambassador of Turkey
- Melek Baykal (born 1954), Turkish actress
- Melek Bilge (born 1989), Turkish professional female basketball player
- Melek Delilbaşı (1947–2022), Turkish historian
- Melek Hu (born 1989), Chinese-born Turkish table tennis player
- Melek Mazici (born 1956), Turkish-Finnish visual artist
- Melek Mosso (born 1988), Turkish singer
- Melek Özdil (born 1916), Turkish rower
- Melek Taus, a central figure of the Yazidi religion
- Melek Tourhan (1869–1956), Queen consort of Egypt

=== Surname ===
- Abdurrahman Melek (1896–1978), prime minister of the Republic of Hatay

=== Epithet ===
- Melek Ahmed Pasha (1604–1662), Ottoman grand vizier
- Melek Mehmed Pasha (1719–1802), Ottoman Bosnian grand vizier

== Other uses ==
- Melek (album), an album by Candan Erçetin
- Melek, Nitra District, village in the Nitra District, Slovakia

== See also ==
- Malak (disambiguation)
