= Malík =

Malík (feminine: Malíková) is a Czech and Slovak surname. Notable people with the surname include:

- Anna Belousovová (née Malíková; born 1959), Slovak politician
- Barbora Malíková (born 2001), Czech sprinter
- Helena Malikova (born 1983), French-Slovak civil servant
- Jan Malík (born 1992), Czech footballer
- Marek Malík (born 1975), Czech ice hockey player
- Štefan Malík (born 1966), Slovak race walker
- Zuzana Malíková (born 1983), Slovak race walker
