= List of Phyxelididae species =

This page lists all described species of the spider family Phyxelididae accepted by the World Spider Catalog as of January 2021:

== A ==
=== Ambohima ===
Ambohima Griswold, 1990

- A. andrefana Griswold, Wood & Carmichael, 2012 — Madagascar
- A. antsinanana Griswold, Wood & Carmichael, 2012 — Madagascar
- A. avaratra Griswold, Wood & Carmichael, 2012 — Madagascar
- A. maizina Griswold, Wood & Carmichael, 2012 — Madagascar
- A. pauliani Griswold, 1990 — Madagascar
- A. ranohira Griswold, Wood & Carmichael, 2012 — Madagascar
- A. sublima Griswold, 1990 (type) — Madagascar
- A. vato Griswold, Wood & Carmichael, 2012 — Madagascar
- A. zandry Griswold, Wood & Carmichael, 2012 — Madagascar
- A. zoky Griswold, Wood & Carmichael, 2012 — Madagascar

== K ==
=== Kulalania ===
Kulalania Griswold, 1990

- K. antiqua Griswold, 1990 (type) — Kenya

== L ==
=== Lamaika ===
Lamaika Griswold, 1990

- L. distincta Griswold, 1990 (type) — South Africa

== M ==
=== Malaika ===
Malaika Lehtinen, 1967

- M. delicatula Griswold, 1990 — South Africa
- M. longipes (Purcell, 1904) (type) — South Africa

=== Manampoka ===
Manampoka Griswold, Wood & Carmichael, 2012

- M. atsimo Griswold, Wood & Carmichael, 2012 (type) — Madagascar

=== Matundua ===
Matundua Lehtinen, 1967

- M. silvatica (Purcell, 1904) (type) — South Africa

== N ==
=== Namaquarachne ===
Namaquarachne Griswold, 1990

- N. angulata Griswold, 1990 — South Africa
- N. hottentotta (Pocock, 1900) — South Africa
- N. khoikhoiana Griswold, 1990 (type) — South Africa
- N. thaumatula Griswold, 1990 — South Africa
- N. tropata Griswold, 1990 — South Africa

== P ==
=== Phyxelida ===
Phyxelida Simon, 1894

- P. abyssinica Griswold, 1990 — Ethiopia
- P. anatolica Griswold, 1990 — Cyprus, Turkey, Israel
- P. apwania Griswold, 1990 — Kenya, Tanzania
- P. bifoveata (Strand, 1913) — East Africa
- P. carcharata Griswold, 1990 — Kenya
- P. crassibursa Griswold, 1990 — Kenya
- P. eurygyna Griswold, 1990 — Malawi
- P. irwini Griswold, 1990 — Kenya
- P. jabalina Griswold, 1990 — Tanzania
- P. kipia Griswold, 1990 — Tanzania
- P. makapanensis Simon, 1894 (type) — South Africa
- P. mirabilis (L. Koch, 1875) — Ethiopia
- P. nebulosa (Tullgren, 1910) — Kenya, Tanzania
- P. pingoana Griswold, 1990 — Kenya
- P. sindanoa Griswold, 1990 — Kenya
- P. tanganensis (Simon & Fage, 1922) — Tanzania
- P. umlima Griswold, 1990 — Tanzania

=== Pongolania ===
Pongolania Griswold, 1990

- P. chrysionaria Griswold, 1990 — South Africa
- P. pongola Griswold, 1990 (type) — South Africa

== R ==
=== Rahavavy ===
Rahavavy Griswold, Wood & Carmichael, 2012

- R. fanivelona (Griswold, 1990) (type) — Madagascar
- R. ida Griswold, Wood & Carmichael, 2012 — Madagascar
- R. malagasyana (Griswold, 1990) — Madagascar

== T ==
=== Themacrys ===
Themacrys Simon, 1906

- T. cavernicola (Lawrence, 1939) — South Africa
- T. irrorata Simon, 1906 (type) — South Africa
- T. monticola (Lawrence, 1939) — South Africa
- T. silvicola (Lawrence, 1938) — South Africa
- T. ukhahlamba Griswold, 1990 — South Africa

== V ==
=== Vidole ===
Vidole

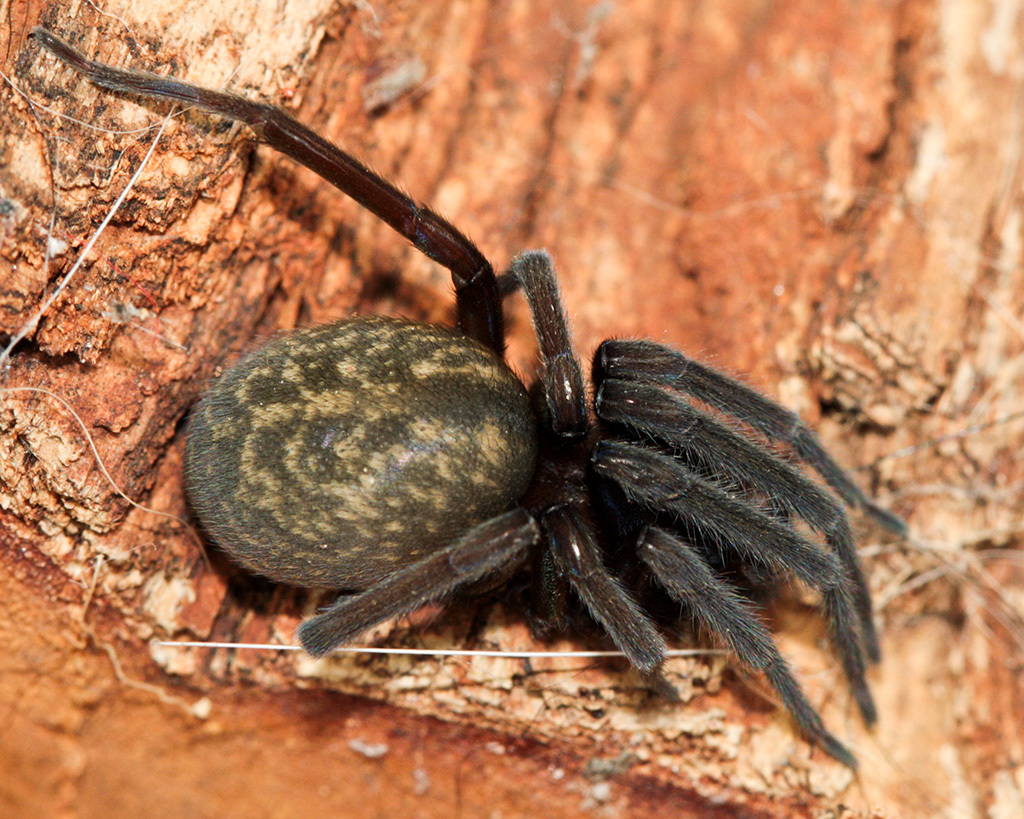
Vidole capensis

Vidole Lehtinen, 1967

- V. capensis (Pocock, 1900) (type) — South Africa
- V. helicigyna Griswold, 1990 — South Africa
- V. lyra Griswold, 1990 — South Africa
- V. schreineri (Purcell, 1904) — South Africa
- V. sothoana Griswold, 1990 — Lesotho, South Africa

=== Vytfutia ===
Vytfutia Deeleman-Reinhold, 1986

- V. bedel Deeleman-Reinhold, 1986 (type) — Indonesia (Sumatra)
- V. pallens Deeleman-Reinhold, 1989 — Borneo

== X ==
=== Xevioso ===
Xevioso Lehtinen, 1967

- X. amica Griswold, 1990 — South Africa
- X. aululata Griswold, 1990 — South Africa
- X. cepfi Pett & Jocqué, 2020 — Mozambique
- X. colobata Griswold, 1990 — South Africa
- X. jocquei Griswold, 1990 — Malawi
- X. kulufa Griswold, 1990 — South Africa
- X. lichmadina Griswold, 1990 — South Africa
- X. megcummingae Pett & Jocqué, 2020 — Malawi, Zimbabwe
- X. orthomeles Griswold, 1990 — Zimbabwe, Eswatini, South Africa
- X. tuberculata (Lawrence, 1939) (type) — South Africa
- X. zuluana (Lawrence, 1939) — South Africa
