= Xevioso tuberculata =

Ingwavuma Xevioso Hackled Band Spider

Conservation status
- Least Concern (SANBI Red List)

Scientific classification
- Kingdom: Animalia
- Phylum: Arthropoda
- Subphylum: Chelicerata
- Class: Arachnida
- Order: Araneae
- Infraorder: Araneomorphae
- Family: Phyxelididae
- Genus: Xevioso
- Species: X. tuberculata

Binomial name
- Xevioso tuberculata (Lawrence, 1939)

Synonyms
- Haemilla tuberculata Lawrence, 1939

Species of spider

Xevioso tuberculata is a species of spider in the family Phyxelididae. It is endemic to South Africa and is commonly known as the Ingwavuma Xevioso hackled band spider.

== Distribution ==
Xevioso tuberculata is endemic to South Africa and occurs in two provinces, KwaZulu-Natal and Mpumalanga. The species is found at altitudes of 646 to 647 m above sea level. Locations include Ingwavuma in KwaZulu-Natal and Crocodile Valley Estate in Mpumalanga.

== Habitat and ecology ==
Xevioso tuberculata inhabits the Savanna biome. These ground retreat-web cryptic spiders live in dark places. The species has been recorded from citrus orchards and is able to survive in agroecosystems.

== Conservation ==
Xevioso tuberculata is listed as Least Concern by the South African National Biodiversity Institute. Despite being known from only two collections, the species has been recorded from citrus orchards and is able to survive in agroecosystems. It is suspected to be more widespread and currently under collected. There are no significant threats to the species.

== Taxonomy ==
The species was originally described by Lawrence in 1939 as Haemilla tuberculata from Ingwavuma in KwaZulu-Natal. It was later revised by Griswold in 1990 and is known from both sexes.
