= Namaquarachne thaumatula =

Scientific classification
- Kingdom: Animalia
- Phylum: Arthropoda
- Subphylum: Chelicerata
- Class: Arachnida
- Order: Araneae
- Infraorder: Araneomorphae
- Family: Phyxelididae
- Genus: Namaquarachne
- Species: N. thaumatula

Binomial name
- Namaquarachne thaumatula Griswold, 1990

Synonyms
- Auximus hottentottus Purcell, 1908 (misidentified); Matundua hottentottus Lehtinen, 1967 (misidentified)

Species of spider

Namaquarachne thaumatula is a species of spider in the family Phyxelididae. It is endemic to South Africa.

== Distribution ==
Namaquarachne thaumatula is endemic to the Northern Cape province of South Africa. It is known from two localities, Steinkopf and Gams 60.

== Habitat and ecology ==
The species is a ground retreat-web cryptic spider found in the arid Succulent Karoo biome. It has been recorded at elevations ranging from 718 to 870 m above sea level.

== Conservation ==
Namaquarachne thaumatula is listed as Data Deficient by SANBI. The species is known from only two localities, with specimens originally collected in 1904. Mining activities at both sites may pose a threat to the species. More sampling is needed to determine the species range.

== Taxonomy ==
The species was originally described by Griswold in 1990 from Steinkopf. The species had been previously misidentified as Auximus hottentottus by Purcell in 1908 and as Matundua hottentottus by Pekka Lehtinen in 1967.
