= Xevioso lichmadina =

Haenertsburg Xevioso Hackled Band Spider

Conservation status
- Vulnerable (SANBI Red List)

Scientific classification
- Kingdom: Animalia
- Phylum: Arthropoda
- Subphylum: Chelicerata
- Class: Arachnida
- Order: Araneae
- Infraorder: Araneomorphae
- Family: Phyxelididae
- Genus: Xevioso
- Species: X. lichmadina

Binomial name
- Xevioso lichmadina Griswold, 1990

Species of spider

Xevioso lichmadina is a species of spider in the family Phyxelididae. It is endemic to South Africa and is commonly known as the Haenertsburg Xevioso hackled band spider.

== Distribution ==
Xevioso lichmadina is endemic to Limpopo, where it occurs at several localities at altitudes ranging from 657 to 1,399 m above sea level. Locations include Haenertsburg, Swartbos Forest, Trichardtsdal, Wolkberg Nature Reserve, Lekgalameetse Nature Reserve (including Farm The Downs, Balloon Forest, and Farm Malta), and Vhembe Biosphere Vhuvha.

== Habitat and ecology ==
Xevioso lichmadina inhabits the Savanna biome. These ground retreat-web cryptic spiders live in dark places. A male was sampled from beneath leaves in forest litter in riverine forest.

== Conservation ==
Xevioso lichmadina is listed as Vulnerable by the South African National Biodiversity Institute. In several locations, the species is experiencing ongoing loss of habitat, which qualifies it for Vulnerable status. There is ongoing transformation of its habitat outside protected areas to agroforestry plantations, crop cultivation, and urban development. The species is protected in Legalameetse Nature Reserve and Wolkberg Nature Reserve, but more sampling is needed.

== Taxonomy ==
The species was described by Griswold in 1990 from Haenertsburg and is known from both sexes.
