= Namaquarachne khoikhoiana =

Scientific classification
- Kingdom: Animalia
- Phylum: Arthropoda
- Subphylum: Chelicerata
- Class: Arachnida
- Order: Araneae
- Infraorder: Araneomorphae
- Family: Phyxelididae
- Genus: Namaquarachne
- Species: N. khoikhoiana

Binomial name
- Namaquarachne khoikhoiana Griswold, 1990

Species of spider

Namaquarachne khoikhoiana is a species of spider in the family Phyxelididae. It is endemic to South Africa.

== Distribution ==
Namaquarachne khoikhoiana is endemic to the Northern Cape province of South Africa, known only from the type locality at Kamieskroon in the Kamies Mountains.

== Habitat and ecology ==
The species is a ground retreat-web cryptic spider recorded beneath boulders in montane Fynbos biome. It has been found at 759 m above sea level.

== Conservation ==
Namaquarachne khoikhoiana is listed as Data Deficient by SANBI. The species is known only from the type locality based on specimens collected in 1985. More sampling is needed to determine the species range.

== Taxonomy ==
The species was originally described by Griswold in 1990 from Kamieskroon. Namaquarachne khoikhoiana is the type species of the genus Namaquarachne.
