= Xevioso aululata =

Bergvliet Xevioso Hackled Band Spider

Conservation status
- Least Concern (SANBI Red List)

Scientific classification
- Kingdom: Animalia
- Phylum: Arthropoda
- Subphylum: Chelicerata
- Class: Arachnida
- Order: Araneae
- Infraorder: Araneomorphae
- Family: Phyxelididae
- Genus: Xevioso
- Species: X. aululata

Binomial name
- Xevioso aululata Griswold, 1990

Species of spider

Xevioso aululata is a species of spider in the family Phyxelididae. It is endemic to South Africa and is commonly known as the Bergvliet Xevioso hackled band spider.

== Distribution ==
Xevioso aululata is endemic to Mpumalanga, where it occurs at several localities at altitudes ranging from 171 to 1,649 m above sea level. Locations include Bergvliet Forest Station, Ohrigstad, Crocodile Bridge, and God's Window.

== Habitat and ecology ==
Xevioso aululata inhabits the Grassland and Savanna biomes. These ground retreat-web cryptic spiders live in damp and dark places and make webs on the ground. The species has been sampled with pitfall traps in pine plantations in Bergvliet State Forest and is able to survive in pine plantations, which is one of the main land uses within its range.

== Conservation ==
Xevioso aululata is listed as Least Concern by the South African National Biodiversity Institute. Although there has been extensive transformation of the species' habitat to agroforestry plantations, crop cultivation and urban development, the species is able to survive in pine plantations. No direct threats are known.

== Taxonomy ==
The species was described by Griswold in 1990 from Bergvliet State Forest and is known from both sexes.
