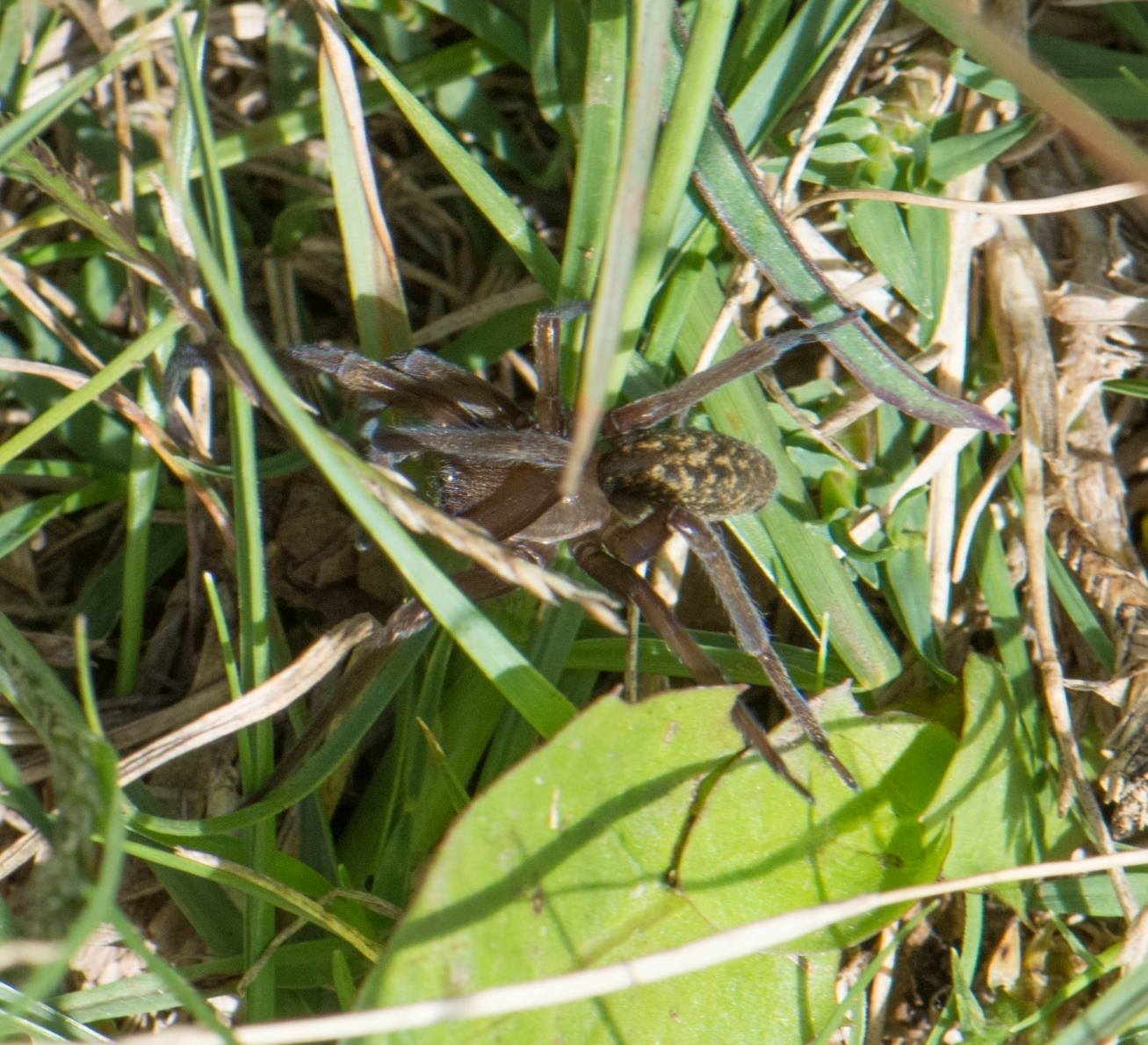

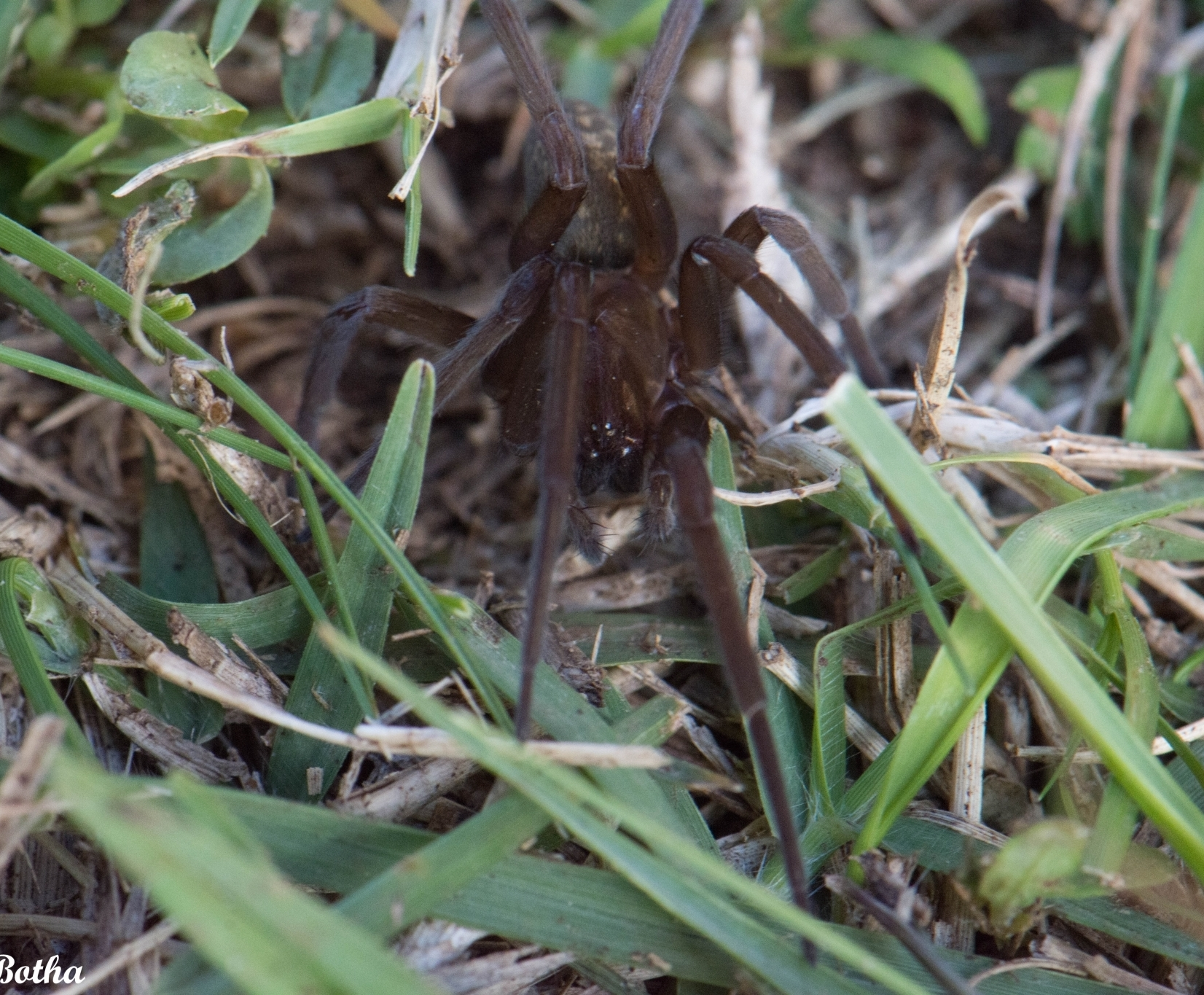

Scientific classification
- Kingdom: Animalia
- Phylum: Arthropoda
- Subphylum: Chelicerata
- Class: Arachnida
- Order: Araneae
- Infraorder: Araneomorphae
- Family: Phyxelididae
- Genus: Namaquarachne
- Species: N. tropata

Binomial name
- Namaquarachne tropata Griswold, 1990

= Namaquarachne tropata =

Grootvadersbos Namaquarachne Hackled Band Spider

Species of spider

Namaquarachne tropata is a species of spider in the family Phyxelididae. It is endemic to South Africa and is commonly known as the Grootvadersbos Namaquarachne hackled band spider.

== Distribution ==
Namaquarachne tropata is endemic to South Africa, with records from both the Eastern Cape and Western Cape provinces. In the Eastern Cape, it has been recorded from Tsitsikamma National Park at Storms River Mouth. In the Western Cape, it is known from Lily Vlei Nature Reserve, Marloth Nature Reserve in the Swellendam District, Riviersonderend, Grootvadersbos, and Diepwalle Forest Station.

== Habitat and ecology ==
The species is a ground retreat-web cryptic spider that lives in dark places. It has been recorded from indigenous and coastal forests as well as bat caves in the Forest biome. The species occurs at elevations ranging from 45 to 242 m above sea level.

== Description ==
Namaquarachne tropata is known from both sexes. The species shares the general morphological characteristics of the genus Namaquarachne, with a total length of 5.5-10.5 mm and a sparsely setose body.

== Conservation ==
Namaquarachne tropata is listed as Least Concern by SANBI. Despite a relatively small distribution range, the species occurs in indigenous forests, which are not significantly threatened. The species is protected in five protected areas including Lily Vlei Nature Reserve, Marloth Nature Reserve, Diepwalle Forest Station, and Garden Route National Park (Tsitsikamma National Park).

== Taxonomy ==
The species was originally described by Griswold in 1990 from Grootvadersbos.
