= Xevioso colobata =

Mariepskop Xevioso Hackled Band Spider

Conservation status
- Least Concern (SANBI Red List)

Scientific classification
- Kingdom: Animalia
- Phylum: Arthropoda
- Subphylum: Chelicerata
- Class: Arachnida
- Order: Araneae
- Infraorder: Araneomorphae
- Family: Phyxelididae
- Genus: Xevioso
- Species: X. colobata

Binomial name
- Xevioso colobata Griswold, 1990

Species of spider

Xevioso colobata is a species of spider in the family Phyxelididae. It is endemic to South Africa and is commonly known as the Mariepskop Xevioso hackled band spider.

== Distribution ==
Xevioso colobata is endemic to South Africa and is distributed across three provinces, KwaZulu-Natal, Limpopo, and Mpumalanga. The species occurs at altitudes ranging from 42 to 1,328 m above sea level.

In KwaZulu-Natal, it is found at Mkuze Game Reserve. In Limpopo, it occurs at Klaserie Game Reserve and Lekgalameetse Nature Reserve. In Mpumalanga, it has been recorded from Crocodile Valley Estate and Mariepskop.

== Habitat and ecology ==
Xevioso colobata inhabits the Savanna biome and has also been found in citrus orchards. These ground retreat-web cryptic spiders live in damp and dark places.

== Conservation ==
Xevioso colobata is listed as Least Concern by the South African National Biodiversity Institute. Although the species is known only from males, it is relatively widespread and is known to survive in agroecosystems. There are no significant threats to the species. It is protected in Klaserie Game Reserve, uMkhuze Game Reserve, and Legalameetse Nature Reserve.

== Taxonomy ==
The species was described by Griswold in 1990 from Mariepskop and is known only from males.
