= Xevioso kulufa =

Hanglip Xevioso Hackled Band Spider

Conservation status
- Least Concern (SANBI Red List)

Scientific classification
- Kingdom: Animalia
- Phylum: Arthropoda
- Subphylum: Chelicerata
- Class: Arachnida
- Order: Araneae
- Infraorder: Araneomorphae
- Family: Phyxelididae
- Genus: Xevioso
- Species: X. kulufa

Binomial name
- Xevioso kulufa Griswold, 1990

Species of spider

Xevioso kulufa is a species of spider in the family Phyxelididae. It is endemic to South Africa and is commonly known as the Hanglip Xevioso hackled band spider.

== Distribution ==
Xevioso kulufa is endemic to South Africa and is distributed across three provinces, KwaZulu-Natal, Limpopo, and Mpumalanga. The species occurs at altitudes ranging from 78 to 969 m above sea level.

Locations include Empangeni in KwaZulu-Natal; Hanglip Forest and Tzaneen in Limpopo; and Nelspruit in Mpumalanga.

== Habitat and ecology ==
Xevioso kulufa occurs in montane forest within the Savanna biome. These ground retreat-web cryptic spiders live in damp and dark places. The species has also been sampled in macadamia orchards in Nelspruit, showing it can survive in agroecosystems.

== Conservation ==
Xevioso kulufa is listed as Least Concern by the South African National Biodiversity Institute. The species is able to survive in agroecosystems and there are no significant threats to the species. It is protected in Hanglip Forest Station.

== Taxonomy ==
The species was described by Griswold in 1990 from Hanglip Forest in Limpopo and is known from both sexes.
