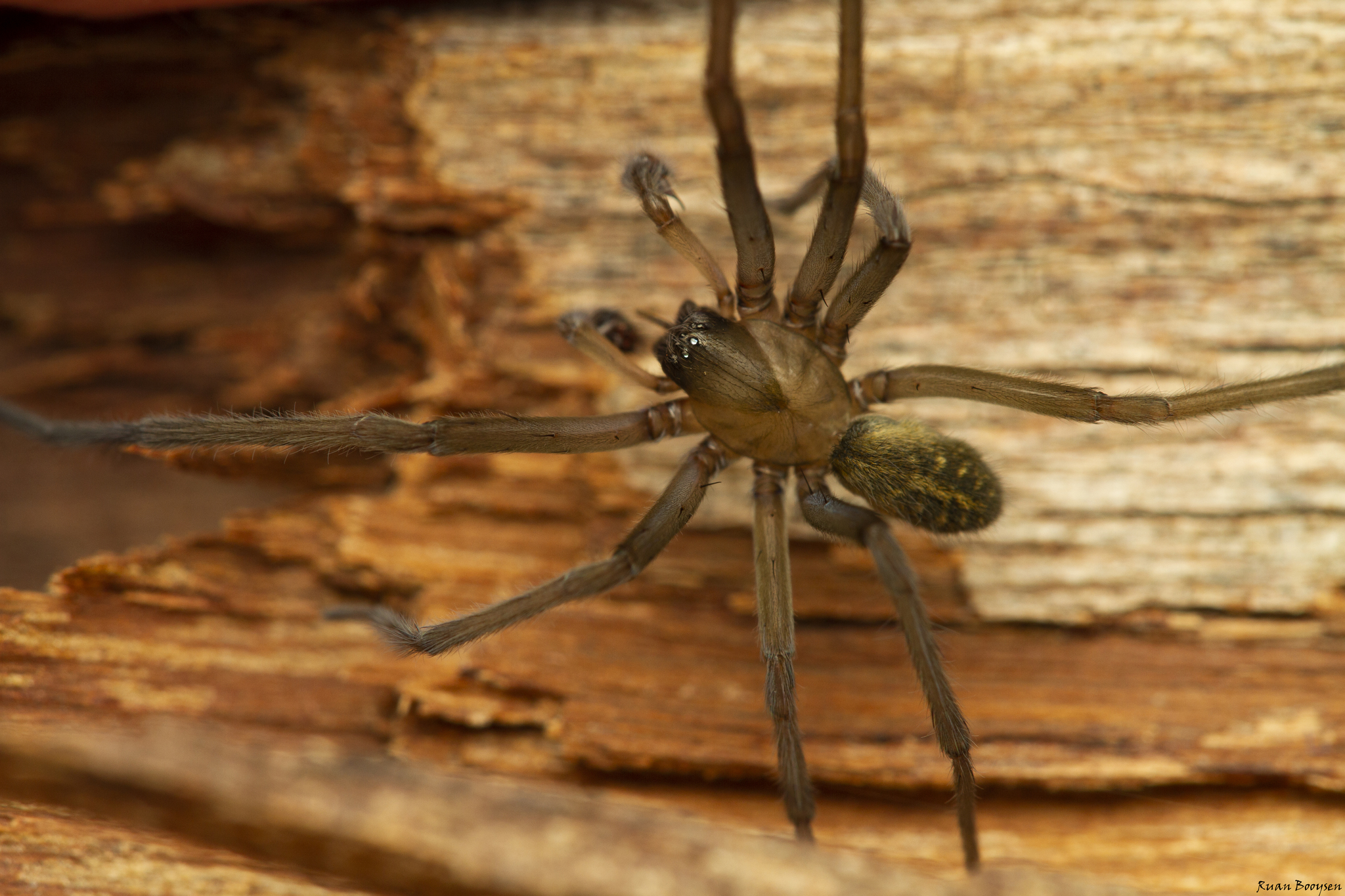
- male
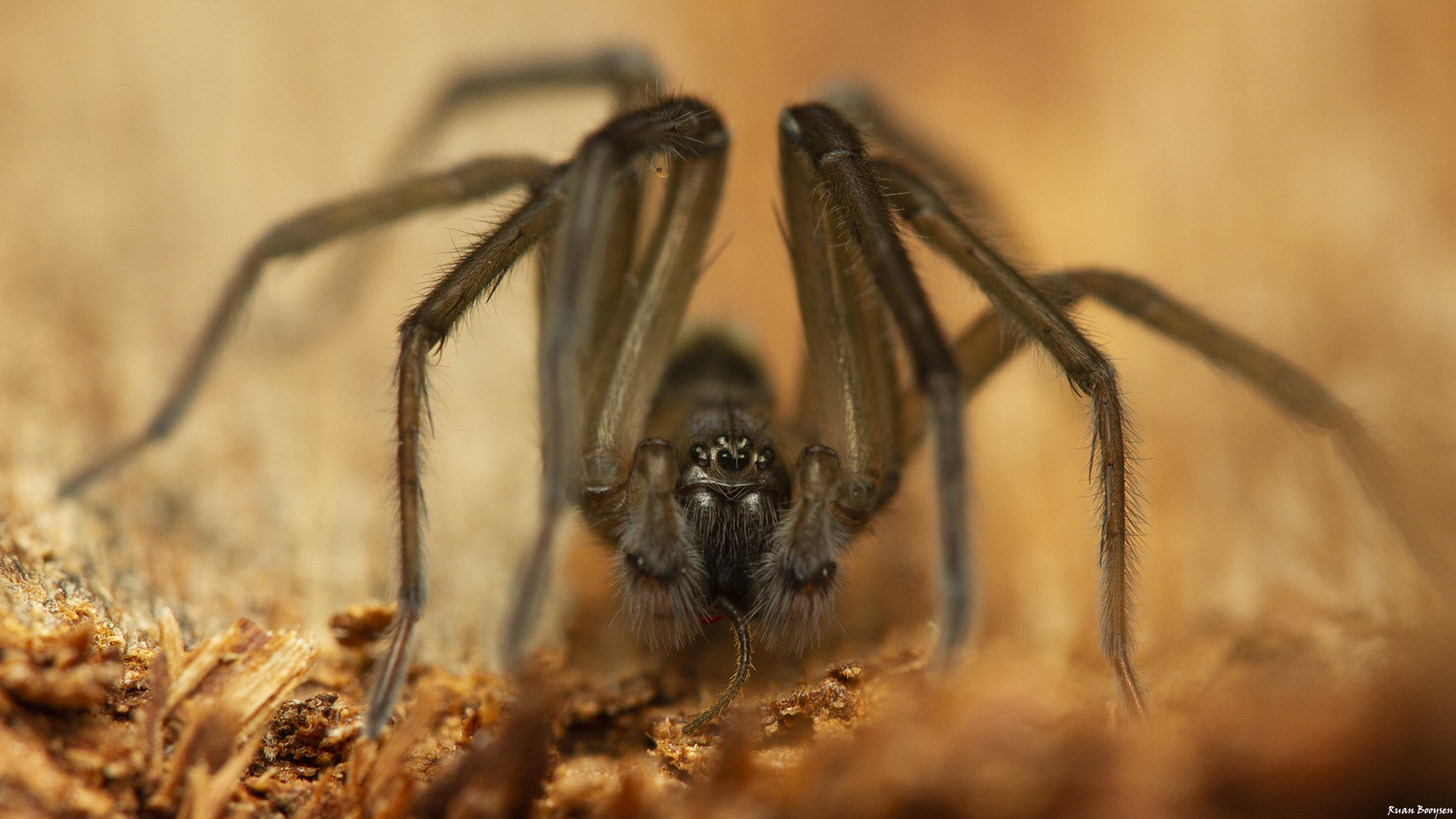
- male

Scientific classification
- Kingdom: Animalia
- Phylum: Arthropoda
- Subphylum: Chelicerata
- Class: Arachnida
- Order: Araneae
- Infraorder: Araneomorphae
- Family: Phyxelididae
- Genus: Xevioso
- Species: X. amica

Binomial name
- Xevioso amica Griswold, 1990

= Xevioso amica =

Natal Xevioso Hackled Band Spider

Species of spider

Xevioso amica is a species of spider in the family Phyxelididae. It is endemic to South Africa and is commonly known as the Natal Xevioso hackled band spider.

== Distribution ==
Xevioso amica is endemic to KwaZulu-Natal, where it has a widespread distribution across various localities including eight protected areas. The species occurs at altitudes ranging from 3 to 1,154 m above sea level.

Notable locations include the iSimangaliso Wetland Park (Cape Vidal, Hellsgate, Fanie's Gate, Lake St. Lucia at Charters Creek, and False Bay), Hluhluwe Nature Reserve, Ithala Game Reserve, Ndumo Game Reserve, Ngome State Forest, and Ophathe Game Reserve. Other locations include Empangeni, Enseleni Nature Reserve, Louwsburg, Richards Bay, and Vryheid.

== Habitat and ecology ==
Xevioso amica inhabits the Indian Ocean Coastal Belt and Savanna biomes. These ground retreat-web cryptic spiders live in damp and dark places and are among the most common cribellate spiders found in coastal dune forests and swamp forests in Zululand. They are typically collected beneath rocks, logs, and tree bark.

== Conservation ==
Xevioso amica is listed as Least Concern by the South African National Biodiversity Institute due to its wide geographical range. There are no significant threats to the species. It is protected in several protected areas including iSimangaliso Wetland Park, Hluhluwe Nature Reserve, Ithala Nature Reserve, Ndumo Game Reserve, Ngome State Forest, and Ophathe Game Reserve.

== Taxonomy ==
The species was described by Griswold in 1990 from Lake St. Lucia in the iSimangaliso Wetland Park.
