= Xevioso zuluana =

Scientific classification
- Kingdom: Animalia
- Phylum: Arthropoda
- Subphylum: Chelicerata
- Class: Arachnida
- Order: Araneae
- Infraorder: Araneomorphae
- Family: Phyxelididae
- Genus: Xevioso
- Species: X. zuluana

Binomial name
- Xevioso zuluana (Lawrence, 1939)

Synonyms
- Haemilla zuluana Lawrence, 1939

Species of spider

Xevioso zuluana is a species of spider in the family Phyxelididae. It is endemic to South Africa.

== Distribution ==
Xevioso zuluana is endemic to KwaZulu-Natal, where it occurs in the Tugela River Valley at altitudes ranging from 82 to 1,153 m above sea level. Locations include Middledrift, Kranskop at Emakabeleni, and Mfongosi.

== Habitat and ecology ==
Xevioso zuluana inhabits the Savanna biome. These ground retreat-web cryptic spiders live in dark places.

== Conservation ==
Xevioso zuluana is listed as Data Deficient. The species has been sampled from different localities in the Tugela River Valley, but most of the sampled material was collected prior to 1940. The status of the species remains obscure and more sampling is needed to determine the species' current range. The species is potentially threatened by agricultural activities in the Tugela River Valley.

== Taxonomy ==
The species was originally described by Lawrence in 1939 as Haemilla zuluana with the type locality given only as Zululand. It was later revised by Griswold in 1990 and is known from both sexes.
