= Pongolania pongola =

Scientific classification
- Kingdom: Animalia
- Phylum: Arthropoda
- Subphylum: Chelicerata
- Class: Arachnida
- Order: Araneae
- Infraorder: Araneomorphae
- Family: Phyxelididae
- Genus: Pongolania
- Species: P. pongola

Binomial name
- Pongolania pongola Griswold, 1990

Species of spider

Pongolania pongola is a species of spider in the family Phyxelididae. It is endemic to South Africa.

== Distribution ==
Pongolania pongola is known only from KwaZulu-Natal, specifically from Pongola at Farm Vergeval. The species occurs at an altitude of 271 m above sea level.

== Habitat and ecology ==
This species inhabits the Savanna biome. Pongolania pongola is a ground-web cryptic spider that lives in dark places.

== Conservation ==
Pongolania pongola is listed as Data Deficient due to lack of data and taxonomic reasons. This Mpumalanga endemic is known only from a single female collected from the type locality in 1985. The status of the species remains obscure, and additional sampling is needed to collect males and determine the species' range. Threats to this species are unknown.

== Taxonomy ==
The species was originally described by Griswold in 1990 from specimens collected at Pongola. Pongolania pongola serves as the type species for the genus Pongolania and is known from only the female.
