= Pongolania chrysionaria =

Johannesburg Pongolania Hackled Band Spider

Conservation status
- Least Concern (SANBI Red List)

Scientific classification
- Kingdom: Animalia
- Phylum: Arthropoda
- Subphylum: Chelicerata
- Class: Arachnida
- Order: Araneae
- Infraorder: Araneomorphae
- Family: Phyxelididae
- Genus: Pongolania
- Species: P. chrysionaria

Binomial name
- Pongolania chrysionaria Griswold, 1990

Species of spider

Pongolania chrysionaria is a species of spider in the family Phyxelididae. It is endemic to South Africa and is commonly known as the Johannesburg Pongolania hackled band spider.

== Distribution ==
Pongolania chrysionaria is distributed across the two South African provinces of Gauteng and Mpumalanga. The species occurs at altitudes ranging from 219 to 1,871 m above sea level.

== Habitat and ecology ==
This species inhabits the Grassland biome. Pongolania chrysionaria is a ground retreat-web cryptic spider that lives in dark places. The species has been recorded from citrus orchards and maize fields, demonstrating its ability to survive in agroecosystems.

== Conservation ==
Pongolania chrysionaria is listed as Least Concern by the South African National Biodiversity Institute. Despite having a restricted range, the species is able to survive in agroecosystems and is protected in the Suikerbosrand Nature Reserve and Klipriviersberg Nature Reserve. There are no significant threats to the species.

== Taxonomy ==
The species was originally described by Griswold in 1990 from specimens collected in Johannesburg. Pongolania chrysionaria is known from only the female.
