= Namaquarachne angulata =

Kamaggas Namaquarachne Hackled Band Spider

Scientific classification
- Kingdom: Animalia
- Phylum: Arthropoda
- Subphylum: Chelicerata
- Class: Arachnida
- Order: Araneae
- Infraorder: Araneomorphae
- Family: Phyxelididae
- Genus: Namaquarachne
- Species: N. angulata

Binomial name
- Namaquarachne angulata Griswold, 1990

Species of spider

Namaquarachne angulata is a species of spider in the family Phyxelididae. It is endemic to South Africa and is commonly known as the Kamaggas Namaquarachne hackled band spider.

== Distribution ==
Namaquarachne angulata is endemic to the Northern Cape province of South Africa. It is known from only two localities, the type locality at Kamaggas and the Richtersveld Transfrontier National Park.

== Habitat and ecology ==
The species is a ground retreat-web cryptic spider recorded from the Succulent Karoo and Desert biomes. It has been found at elevations ranging from 231 to 250 m above sea level.

== Conservation ==
Namaquarachne angulata is listed as Data Deficient due to limited distribution data and taxonomic knowledge. The species was originally described from specimens collected in 1904, with only one additional record from the Richtersveld Transfrontier National Park since then. More sampling is needed to collect the male and determine the species range. The species is protected within the Richtersveld Transfrontier National Park.

== Taxonomy ==
The species was originally described by Griswold in 1990 from the type locality Kamaggas.
