= Phyxelida makapanensis =

Cave Phyxelida Hackled Band Spider

Conservation status
- Least Concern (SANBI Red List)

Scientific classification
- Kingdom: Animalia
- Phylum: Arthropoda
- Subphylum: Chelicerata
- Class: Arachnida
- Order: Araneae
- Infraorder: Araneomorphae
- Family: Phyxelididae
- Genus: Phyxelida
- Species: P. makapanensis

Binomial name
- Phyxelida makapanensis Simon, 1894

Species of spider

Phyxelida makapanensis is a species of spider in the family Phyxelididae. It is endemic to South Africa and is commonly known as the cave Phyxelida hackled band spider.

== Distribution ==
Phyxelida makapanensis is distributed across three South African provinces: Gauteng, Limpopo, and Mpumalanga. The species occurs at altitudes ranging from 415 to 1,734 metres above sea level.

== Habitat and ecology ==
This species inhabits the Grassland and Savanna biomes. Phyxelida makapanensis is a ground retreat-web cryptic spider that lives in damp and dark places. The species has been found deep within Makapan's Cave, where individuals spin very irregular cribellate webs beneath stones or in cracks on cave walls. The flocculent egg sac is attached to the web. Outside of caves, specimens have also been collected from the Grassland biome.

== Conservation ==
Phyxelida makapanensis is listed as Least Concern by the South African National Biodiversity Institute. The species has a wide geographical range and is protected in Klipriviersberg Nature Reserve and Witwatersrand Nature Reserve There are no known significant threats to the species.

== Etymology ==
The species name derives from its type locality at Makapansgat in Limpopo.

== Taxonomy ==
The species was originally described by Eugène Simon in 1894 from specimens collected at Makapansgat in Limpopo. The genus Phyxelida was revised by Griswold in 1990. Phyxelida makapanensis is known from both sexes and serves as the type species for its genus.
