= Namaquarachne hottentotta =

Scientific classification
- Kingdom: Animalia
- Phylum: Arthropoda
- Subphylum: Chelicerata
- Class: Arachnida
- Order: Araneae
- Infraorder: Araneomorphae
- Family: Phyxelididae
- Genus: Namaquarachne
- Species: N. hottentotta

Binomial name
- Namaquarachne hottentotta (Pocock, 1900)

Synonyms
- Auximus hottentottus Pocock, 1900; Matundua hottentottus Lehtinen, 1967

Species of spider

Namaquarachne hottentotta is a species of spider in the family Phyxelididae. It is endemic to South Africa.

== Distribution ==
Namaquarachne hottentotta is endemic to the Northern Cape province of South Africa, known only from the type locality at Garies.

== Habitat and ecology ==
The species is a ground retreat-web cryptic spider recorded from the Succulent Karoo biome. It has been recorded from 327 m above sea level.

== Description ==
Namaquarachne hottentotta is known only from the female.

== Conservation ==
Namaquarachne hottentotta is listed as Data Deficient due to limited distribution data and taxonomic knowledge. The species is known only from the type female collected prior to 1900, and its current status remains unclear. More sampling is needed to collect the male and determine the species range.

== Taxonomy ==
The species was originally described by Pocock in 1900 as Auximus hottentottus from Garies. It was subsequently transferred to Matundua by Pekka Lehtinen in 1967 and then to its current genus by Griswold in 1990.

== Morphology and diagnosis ==
The species is known only from the female specimen used in the original description. As with other members of the family Phyxelididae, it exhibits a compact body form associated with a ground-dwelling lifestyle and retreat-web construction. Diagnostic characters distinguishing this species are primarily based on genital morphology, which remains the principal basis for species identification within the family.

The original description provided limited somatic detail, reflecting early 20th-century taxonomic practices. Later taxonomic revisions reassessed the species using comparative morphology across Phyxelididae, confirming its placement within the genus Namaquarachne based on female genital structures and general body proportions.

No male specimen has been recorded to date, and male diagnostic characters remain unknown. As a result, intraspecific variation and sexual dimorphism cannot currently be assessed for this species.
