= Vytfutia =

Scientific classification
- Kingdom: Animalia
- Phylum: Arthropoda
- Subphylum: Chelicerata
- Class: Arachnida
- Order: Araneae
- Infraorder: Araneomorphae
- Family: Phyxelididae
- Genus: Vytfutia; Deeleman-Reinhold, 1986

Type species
- V. bedel Deeleman-Reinhold, 1986

Species
- V. bedel Deeleman-Reinhold, 1986 – Indonesia (Sumatra); V. pallens Deeleman-Reinhold, 1989 – Borneo

Genus of spiders

Vytfutia is a genus of Indonesian araneomorph spiders in the family Phyxelididae, and was first described by Christa Laetitia Deeleman-Reinhold in 1986. As of June 2019 it contains only two species, found only on Borneo and Sumatra: V. bedel and V. pallens.
