= Ambohima =

Scientific classification
- Kingdom: Animalia
- Phylum: Arthropoda
- Subphylum: Chelicerata
- Class: Arachnida
- Order: Araneae
- Infraorder: Araneomorphae
- Family: Phyxelididae
- Genus: Ambohima; Griswold, 1990

Type species
- A. sublima Griswold, 1990

Species
- 10, see text

Genus of spiders

Ambohima is a genus of Malagasy araneomorph spiders in the family Phyxelididae, and was first described by C. E. Griswold in 1990.

== Species ==
As of June 2019 it contains ten species, found only on Madagascar:

- Ambohima andrefana Griswold, Wood & Carmichael, 2012 – Madagascar
- Ambohima antisinanana Griswold, Wood & Carmichael, 2012 – Madagascar
- Ambohima avaratra Griswold, Wood & Carmichael, 2012 – Madagascar
- Ambohima maizina Griswold, Wood & Carmichael, 2012 – Madagascar
- Ambohima pauliani Griswold, 1990 – Madagascar
- Ambohima ranohira Griswold, Wood & Carmichael, 2012 – Madagascar
- Ambohima sublima Griswold, 1990 (type) – Madagascar
- Ambohima vato Griswold, Wood & Carmichael, 2012 – Madagascar
- Ambohima zandry Griswold, Wood & Carmichael, 2012 – Madagascar
- Ambohima zoky Griswold, Wood & Carmichael, 2012 – Madagascar
