= Rahavavy =

Scientific classification
- Kingdom: Animalia
- Phylum: Arthropoda
- Subphylum: Chelicerata
- Class: Arachnida
- Order: Araneae
- Infraorder: Araneomorphae
- Family: Phyxelididae
- Genus: Rahavavy; Griswold, Wood & Carmichael, 2012

Type species
- R. fanivelona (Griswold, 1990)

Species
- R. fanivelona (Griswold, 1990); R. ida Griswold, Wood & Carmichael, 2012; R. malagasyana (Griswold, 1990)

Genus of spiders

Rahavavy is a genus of Malagasy araneomorph spiders in the family Phyxelididae, and was first described by C. E. Griswold, H. M. Wood & A. D. Carmichael in 2012. As of June 2019 it contains only three species, found only on Madagascar: R. fanivelona, R. ida, and R. malagasyana.
