= Kulalania =

Scientific classification
- Kingdom: Animalia
- Phylum: Arthropoda
- Subphylum: Chelicerata
- Class: Arachnida
- Order: Araneae
- Infraorder: Araneomorphae
- Family: Phyxelididae
- Genus: Kulalania; Griswold, 1990
- Species: K. antiqua

Binomial name
- Kulalania antiqua Griswold, 1990

Genus of spiders

Kulalania is a monotypic genus of Kenyan araneomorph spiders in the family Phyxelididae containing the single species, Kulalania antiqua. It was first described by C. E. Griswold in 1990, and is only found in Kenya.
