= Lamaika =

Scientific classification
- Kingdom: Animalia
- Phylum: Arthropoda
- Subphylum: Chelicerata
- Class: Arachnida
- Order: Araneae
- Infraorder: Araneomorphae
- Family: Phyxelididae
- Genus: Lamaika
- Species: L. distincta

Binomial name
- Lamaika distincta Griswold, 1990

Species of spider

Lamaika distincta is a species of spider of the monotypic genus Lamaika in the family Phyxelididae. It is endemic to South Africa.

== Distribution ==
Lamaika distincta has a very limited distribution in South Africa, known only from the type locality at Ruigtevlei, Sedgefield in the Western Cape.

== Habitat and ecology ==
The species inhabits cool-temperate forests in the Forest biome. It is a cryptic ground spider that makes retreat-webs in damp and dark places. The species has been recorded from 27 m above sea level.

== Description ==
Lamaika distincta is known only from the male. The species has a total length of 4.08 mm. The carapace, venter of cephalothorax, and legs are yellow-brown, while the abdomen is grey. The cephalic region has a faint, narrow, dark V-shaped mark in front of the thoracic fovea, extending toward the ocular area. The ocular area has black pigment surrounding each eye and extending between the anterior eyes.

The carapace is longer than wide with an entire margin bearing long setae along the margin and posteriorly. The thoracic fovea is long, deep and narrow. The abdomen is oval with a dense layer of fine setae. Males have distinctive modifications on the first leg's metatarsus including a short, subbasal retrolateral process surmounted by a slender, sinuate clasping spine.

== Conservation ==
Lamaika distincta is listed as Data Deficient due to limited distribution data and taxonomic knowledge. The species is known only from specimens collected in 1990, and the female remains unknown. Additional sampling is needed to determine the species' range and collect female specimens.

== Taxonomy ==
The species was originally described by Griswold in 1990 from Sedgefield in the Western Cape.
