= Pongolania =

Scientific classification
- Kingdom: Animalia
- Phylum: Arthropoda
- Subphylum: Chelicerata
- Class: Arachnida
- Order: Araneae
- Infraorder: Araneomorphae
- Family: Phyxelididae
- Genus: Pongolania; Griswold, 1990

Type species
- P. pongola Griswold, 1990

Species
- P. chrysionaria Griswold, 1990; P. pongola Griswold, 1990

Genus of spiders

Pongolania is a genus of South African araneomorph spiders in the family Phyxelididae, and was first described by C. E. Griswold in 1990. As of September 2025 it contains only two species, both endemic to South Africa.

== Description ==
Pongolania are spiders with total lengths ranging from 4 to 6 mm. The carapace has a fovea that is long, narrowed posteriorly, and deep. The anterior eye] row is slightly recurved while the posterior eye row is straight. The chelicerae are smooth, with the promargin of the fang furrow having 5 or 6 teeth and the retromargin having 4-6 teeth.

The sternum is long with a margin that is angled to sinuate, a narrowed base, and an apex forming a right angle. The abdomen usually displays a dorsal, central longitudinal light band and crossbars, rarely uniform, while the ventral bands are bold and clear. The legs are unmodified with leg formula 1423. Metatarsi II-IV have apical combs, while a pseudocalamistrum is absent. The palpal femur has a row of 2 or 3 stout anterobasal thorns.

== Species ==
- Pongolania chrysionaria Griswold, 1990
- Pongolania pongola Griswold, 1990
