= Manampoka =

Scientific classification
- Kingdom: Animalia
- Phylum: Arthropoda
- Subphylum: Chelicerata
- Class: Arachnida
- Order: Araneae
- Infraorder: Araneomorphae
- Family: Phyxelididae
- Genus: Manampoka; Griswold, Wood & Carmichael, 2012
- Species: M. atsimo

Binomial name
- Manampoka atsimo Griswold, Wood & Carmichael, 2012

Genus of spiders

Manampoka is a monotypic genus of Malagasy araneomorph spiders in the family Phyxelididae containing the single species, Manampoka atsimo. It was first described by C. E. Griswold, H. M. Wood & A. D. Carmichael in 2012, and is only found on Madagascar.
