= Namaquarachne =

Scientific classification
- Kingdom: Animalia
- Phylum: Arthropoda
- Subphylum: Chelicerata
- Class: Arachnida
- Order: Araneae
- Infraorder: Araneomorphae
- Family: Phyxelididae
- Genus: Namaquarachne; Griswold, 1990

Type species
- N. khoikhoiana Griswold, 1990

Species
- 5, see text

Genus of spiders

Namaquarachne is a genus of South African araneomorph spiders in the family Phyxelididae, and was first described by C. E. Griswold in 1990.

== Species ==
As of September 2025 it contains five species, found only in South Africa:

- Namaquarachne angulata Griswold, 1990
- Namaquarachne hottentotta (Pocock, 1900)
- Namaquarachne khoikhoiana Griswold, 1990 (type)
- Namaquarachne thaumatula Griswold, 1990
- Namaquarachne tropata Griswold, 1990
