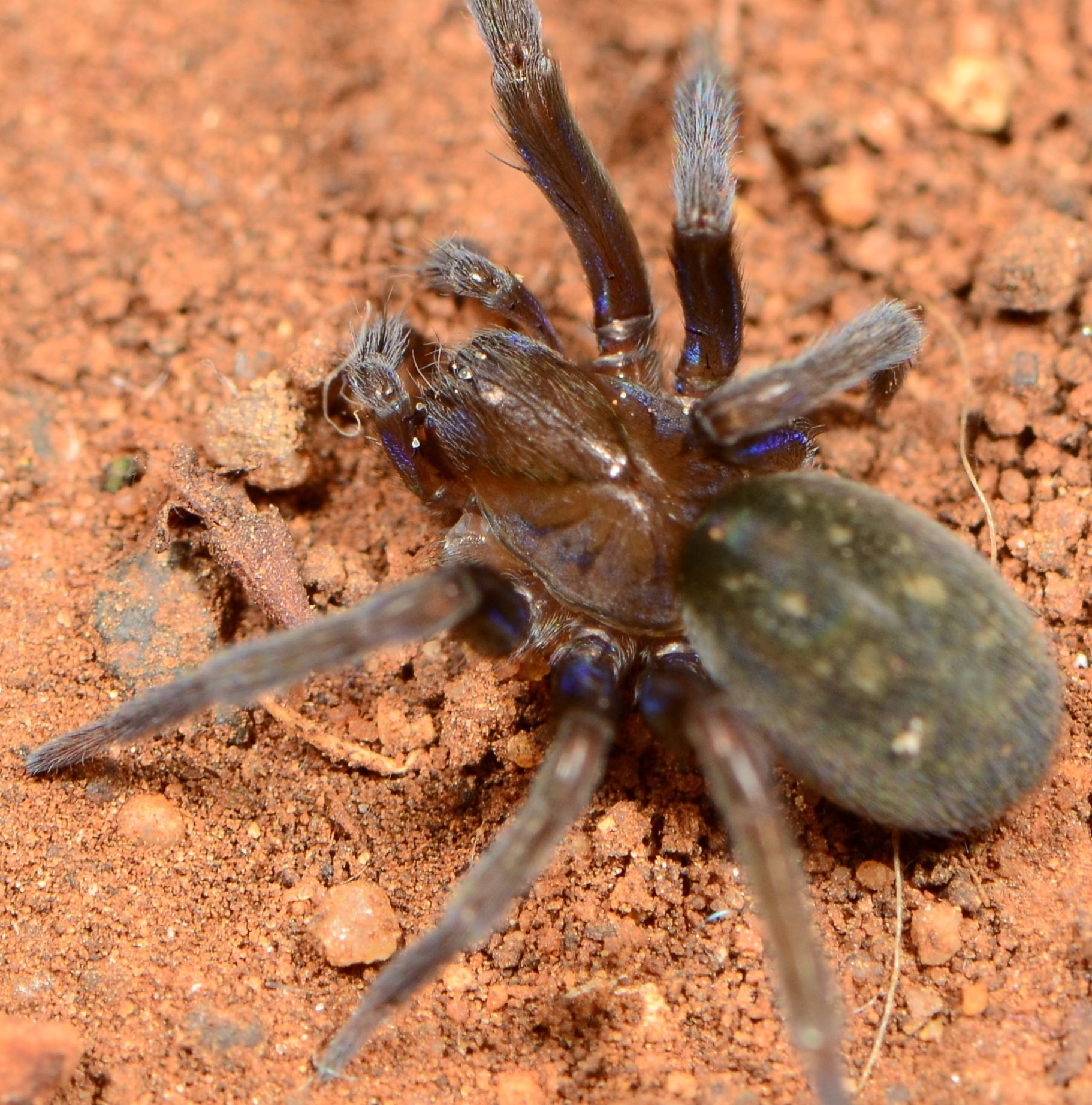
- female
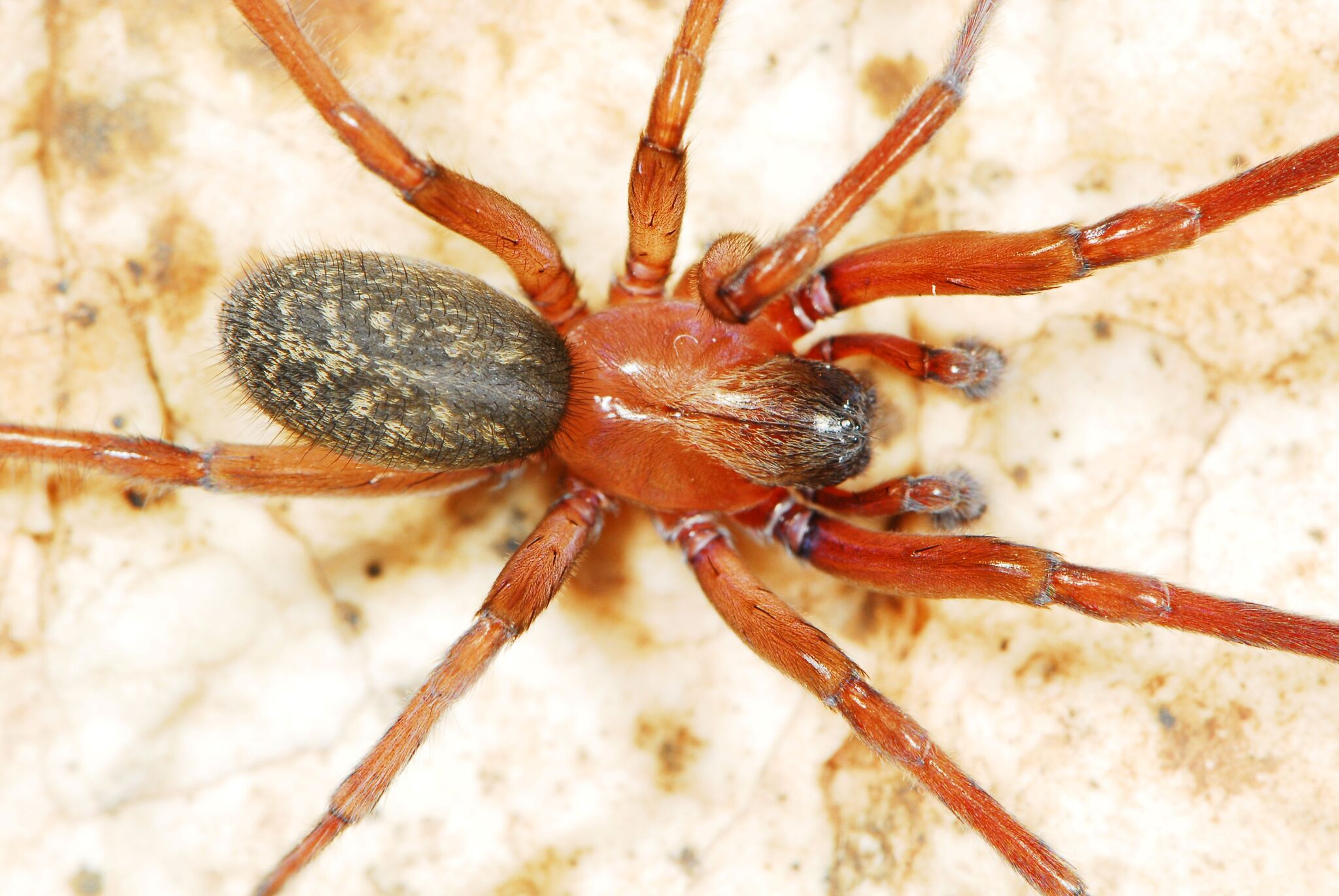
- male

Scientific classification
- Kingdom: Animalia
- Phylum: Arthropoda
- Subphylum: Chelicerata
- Class: Arachnida
- Order: Araneae
- Infraorder: Araneomorphae
- Family: Phyxelididae
- Genus: Vidole
- Species: V. sothoana

Binomial name
- Vidole sothoana Griswold, 1990

= Vidole sothoana =

Common Vidole Hackled Band Spider

Species of spider

Vidole sothoana is a species of spider in the family Phyxelididae. It occurs in South Africa, Lesotho, and Eswatini and is commonly known as the common Vidole hackled band spider.

== Distribution ==
Vidole sothoana is distributed across six South African provinces, Free State, Gauteng, Limpopo, Northern Cape, North West, and Western Cape, and also occurs in Lesotho and Eswatini.

== Habitat and ecology ==
This species inhabits the Grassland and Savanna biomes at altitudes ranging from 500 to 2,826 m above sea level.. Vidole sothoana is a ground retreat-web cryptic spider that lives in dark places. The species occurs in open vegetation, including grasslands and savanna, and has been found in cultivated fields such as maize and cotton.

== Description ==
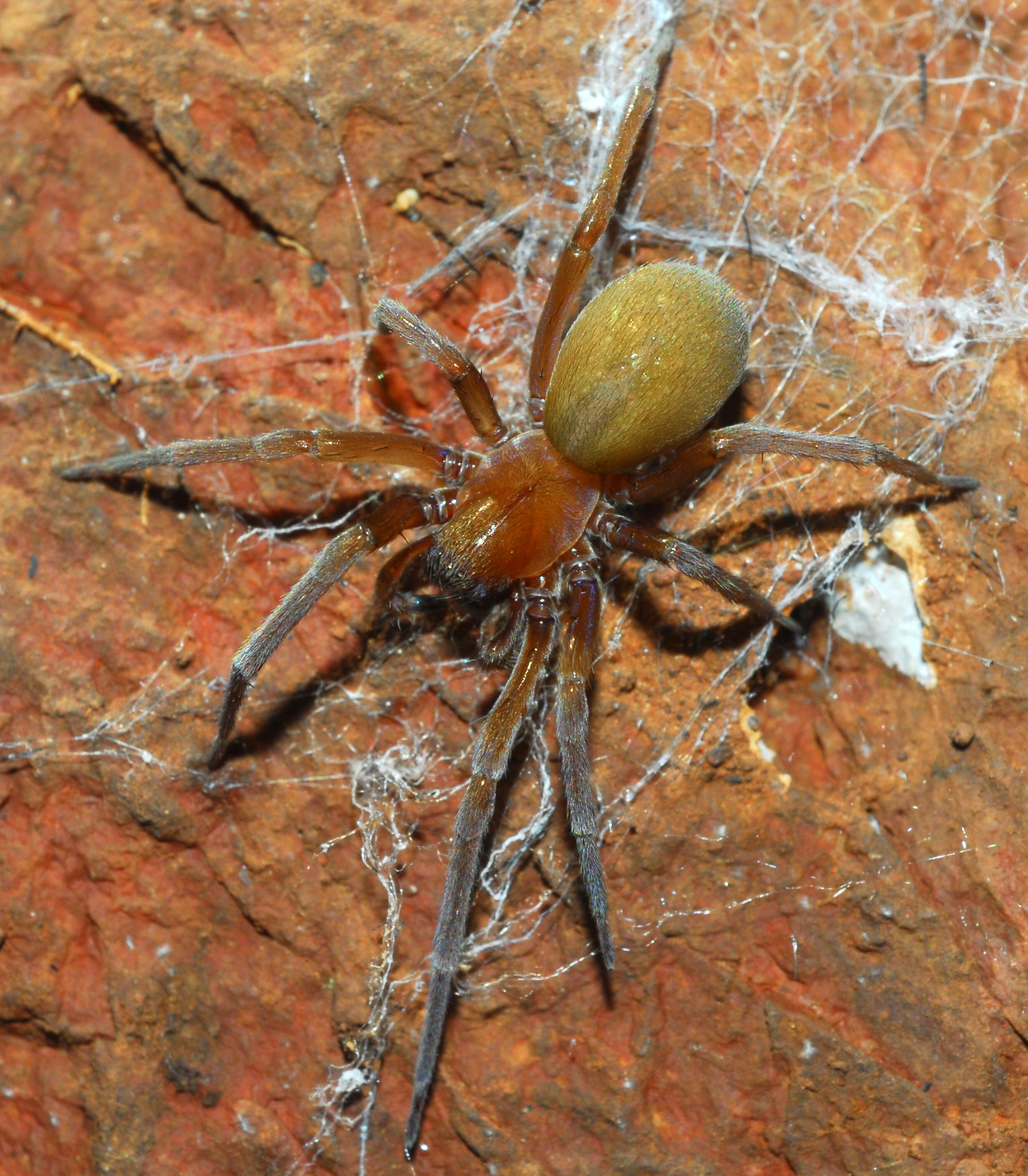
female

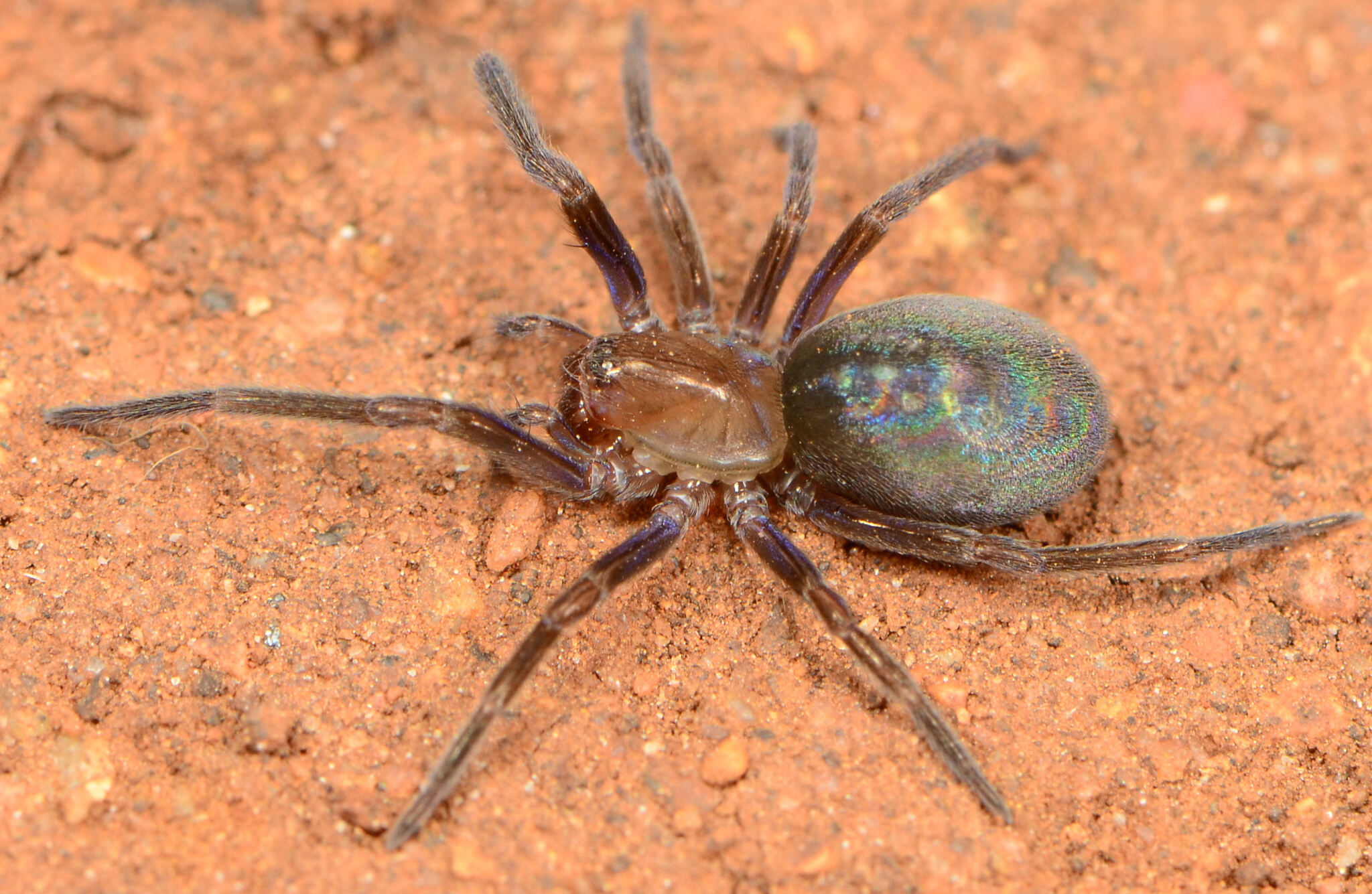
female

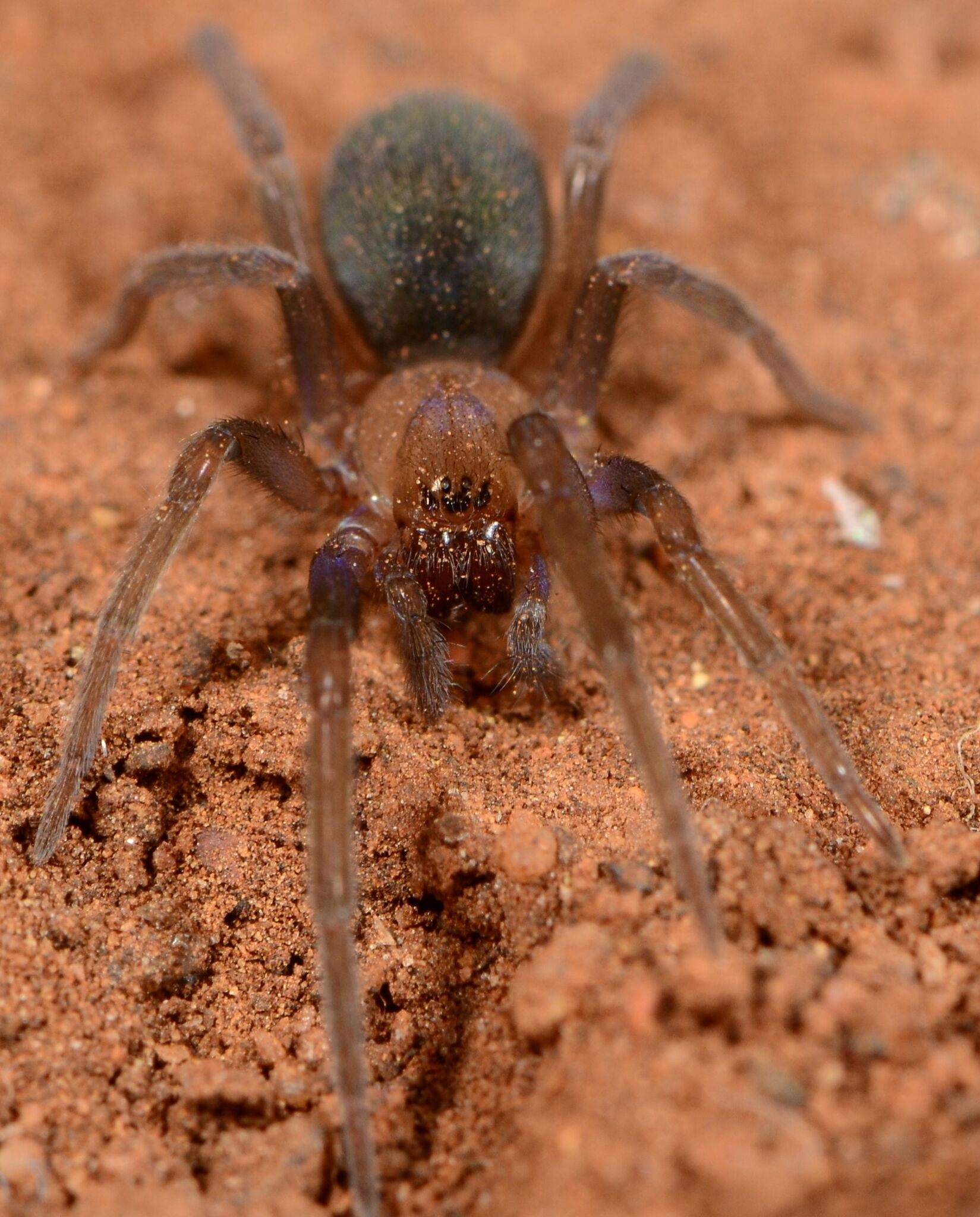
female

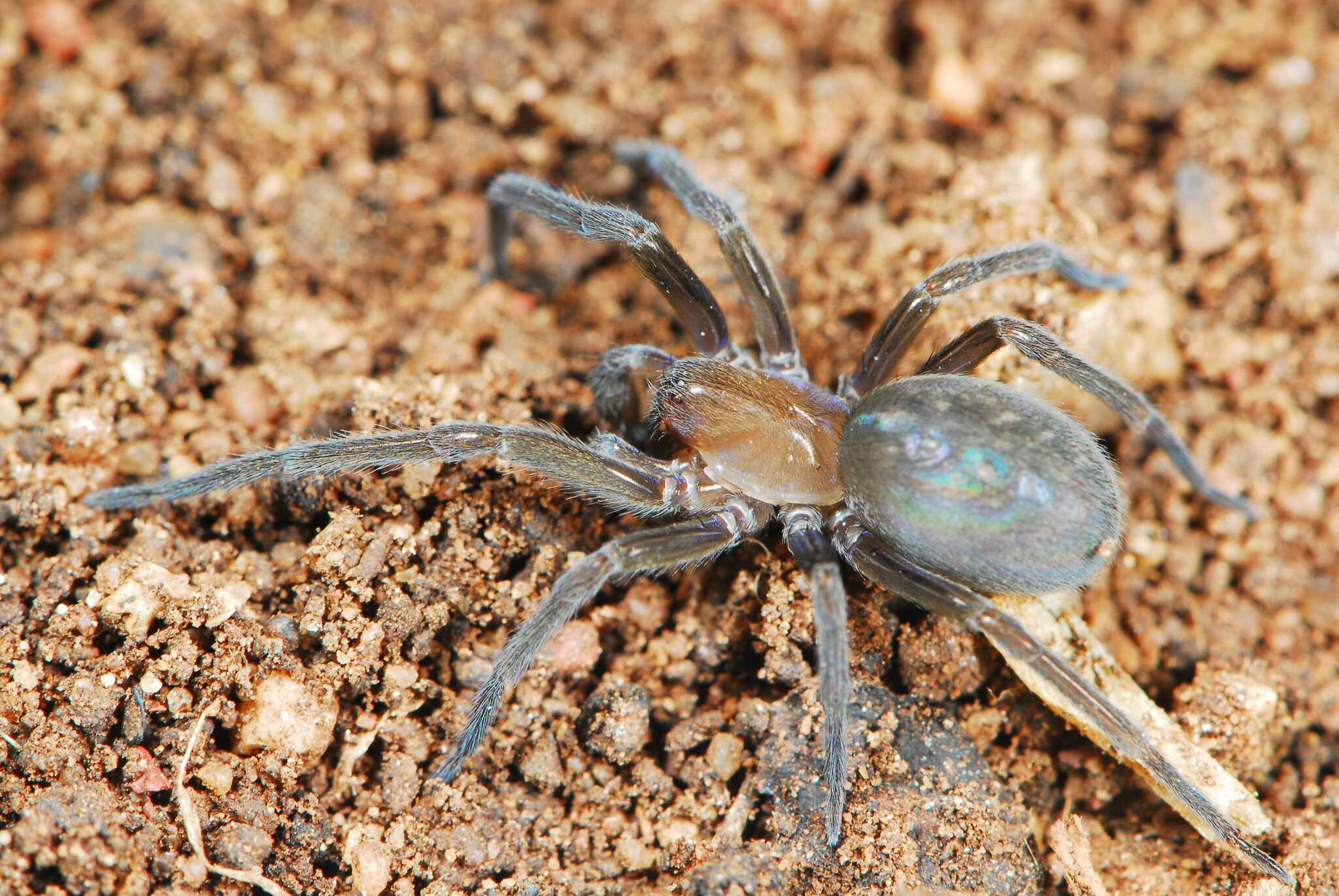
male

== Conservation ==
Vidole sothoana is listed as Least Concern by the South African National Biodiversity Institute. The species is sampled from six provinces and occurs in more than 10 protected areas. Due to its wide geographical range, there are no significant threats to the species.

== Taxonomy ==
The species was described by Griswold in 1990 from Kroondal in North West. Vidole sothoana is known from both sexes.
