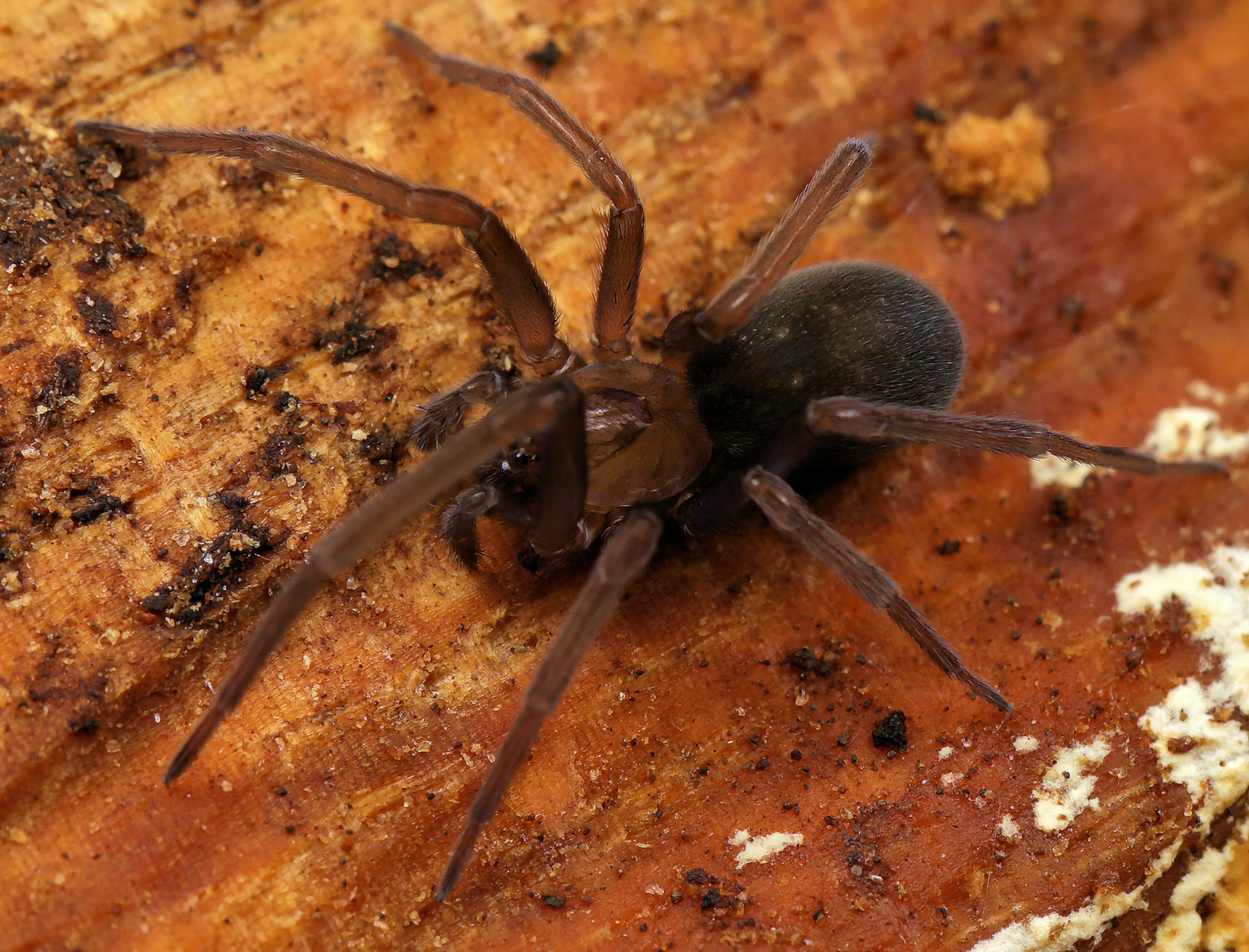
- X. orthomeles
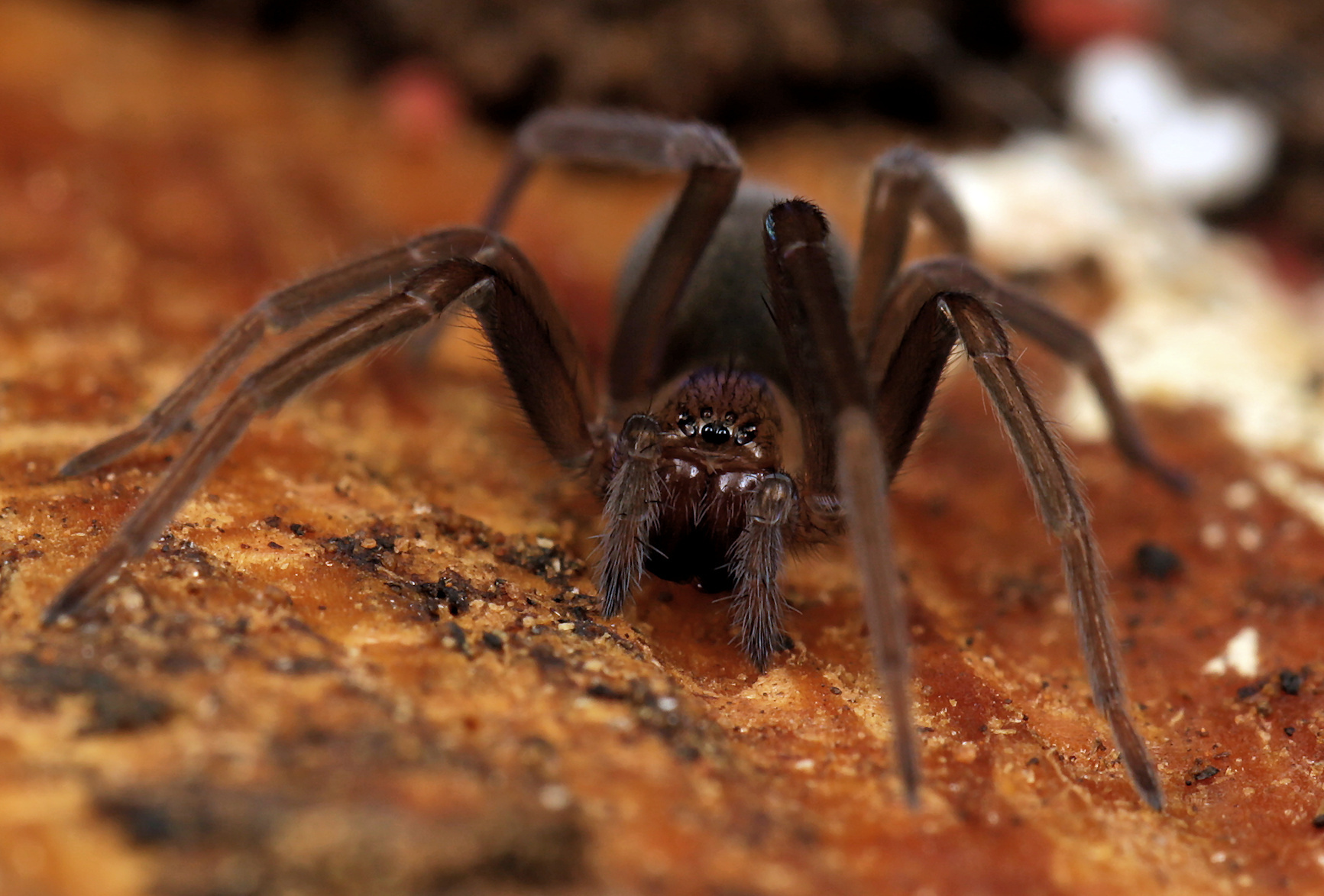

Conservation status
- Least Concern (SANBI Red List)

Scientific classification
- Kingdom: Animalia
- Phylum: Arthropoda
- Subphylum: Chelicerata
- Class: Arachnida
- Order: Araneae
- Infraorder: Araneomorphae
- Family: Phyxelididae
- Genus: Xevioso
- Species: X. orthomeles

Binomial name
- Xevioso orthomeles Griswold, 1990

= Xevioso orthomeles =

Kruger Park Xevioso Hackled Band Spider

Species of spider

Xevioso orthomeles is a species of spider in the family Phyxelididae. It occurs in southern Africa and is commonly known as the Kruger Park Xevioso hackled band spider.

== Distribution ==
Xevioso orthomeles is a southern African endemic known from Zimbabwe, Eswatini, and South Africa. In South Africa, it occurs in three provinces, Gauteng, Limpopo, and Mpumalanga, at altitudes ranging from 131 to 4,755 m above sea level.

South African locations include Bronkhorstspruit (Farm Onverwacht) in Gauteng; Lekgalameetse Nature Reserve in Limpopo; and Barberton, Lochiel, Kruger National Park (Skukuza Camp), and Lowveld National Botanical Garden in Mpumalanga.

== Habitat and ecology ==
Xevioso orthomeles inhabits the Grassland and Savanna biomes. These ground retreat-web cryptic spiders live in dark places and make retreat-webs on the ground. The species occurs primarily in bushveld rather than forest.

== Conservation ==
Xevioso orthomeles is listed as Least Concern by the South African National Biodiversity Institute due to its wide geographical range. There are no significant threats to the species. It is protected in Legalameetse Nature Reserve, Lowveld National Botanical Garden, and Kruger National Park.

== Taxonomy ==
The species was described by Griswold in 1990 from Kruger National Park and is known from both sexes.
