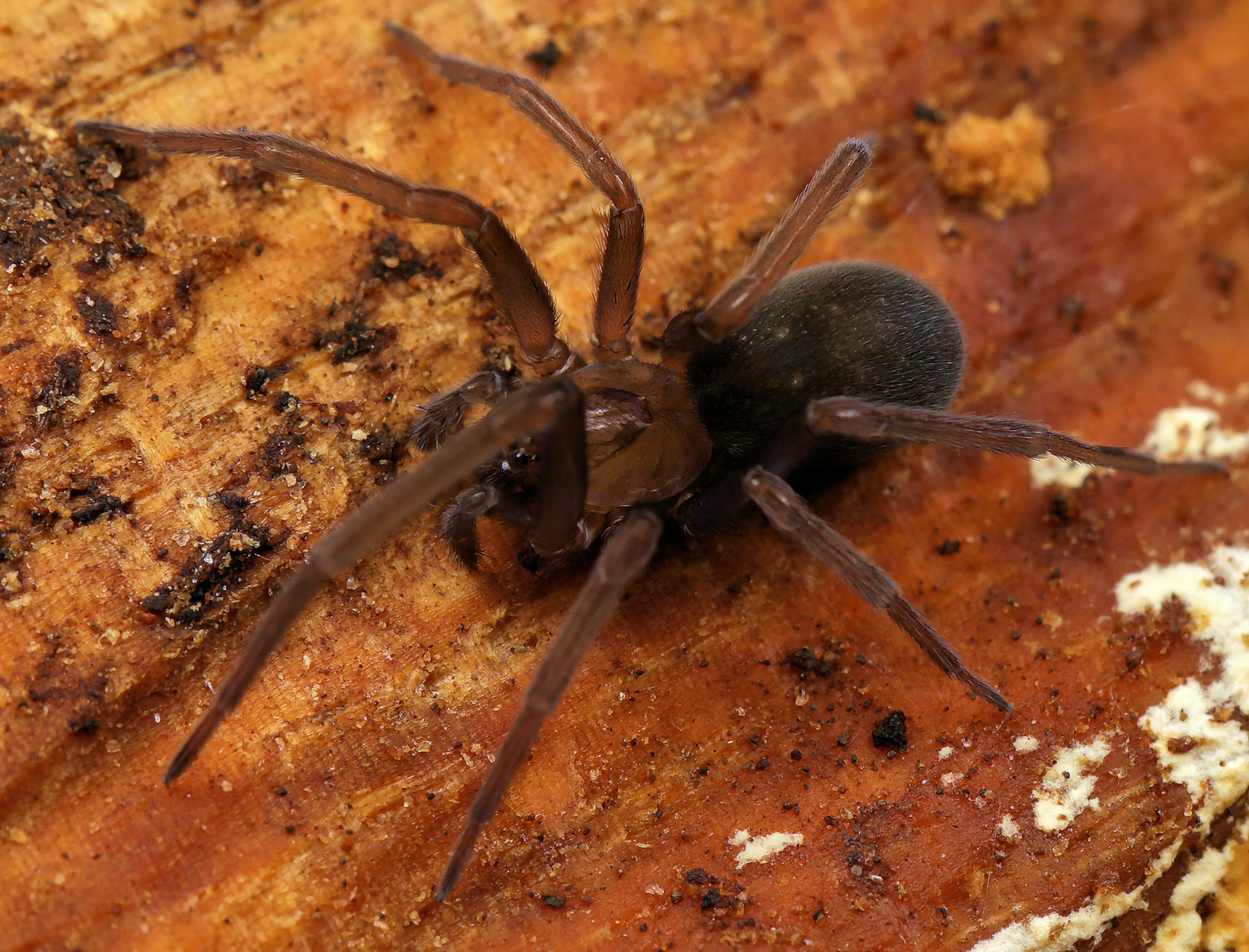
- X. orthomeles
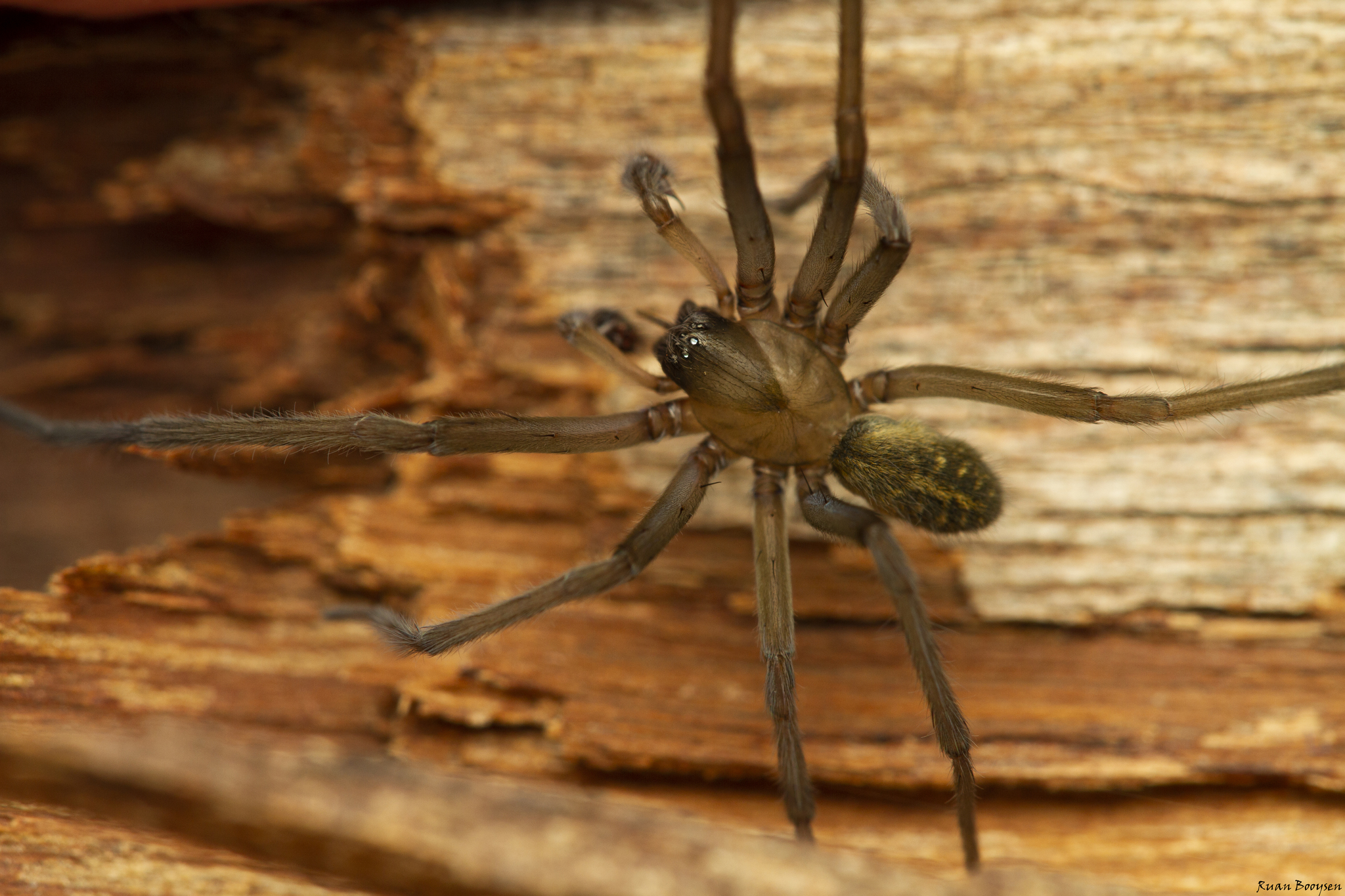
- male X. amica

Scientific classification
- Kingdom: Animalia
- Phylum: Arthropoda
- Subphylum: Chelicerata
- Class: Arachnida
- Order: Araneae
- Infraorder: Araneomorphae
- Family: Phyxelididae
- Genus: Xevioso; Lehtinen, 1967

Type species
- X. tuberculata (Lawrence, 1939)

Species
- 11, see text

= Xevioso (spider) =

Genus of spiders

Xevioso is a genus of African araneomorph spiders in the family Phyxelididae, and was first described by Pekka T. Lehtinen in 1967.

The genus is named after Xɛvioso, a god of thunder in Ewe and Dahomean religion.

== Description ==
Xevioso spiders have a total length ranging from 3.5 to 11 mm. The body is densely covered with setae. The carapace is slightly longer than wide, with a long thoracic fovea that is usually deep and narrowed posteriorly. The anterior eye row is recurved while the posterior eye row is straight. The sternum is long with sides that are angled to sinuate, a narrowed base, and an apex that is blunt to a right angle rather than pointed. The labium length is usually greater than its width.

The abdomen dorsum displays variable markings, while the venter has paired longitudinal bands that range from narrow to absent. The legs follow the formula 1423, with markings that are either uniform or have darkened metatarsi and tarsus on legs I and II. In males, metatarsus I is either unmodified or bears a median prodorsal process and prolateral concavity. Metatarsi III and IV, and usually II, possess apical pro- and retroventral preening combs.

== Habitat and ecology ==
Spiders in this genus construct ground retreat-webs and represents cryptic spiders that inhabit damp and dark environments. These are among the most common cribellate spiders found in coastal dune forests and swamp forests, where they are typically collected beneath rocks, logs, and tree bark. The genus is sampled from the Indian Ocean Coastal Belt and Savanna biomes.

== Species ==
As of September 2025 it contains eleven species, found only in Africa:

- Xevioso amica Griswold, 1990 – South Africa
- Xevioso aululata Griswold, 1990 – South Africa
- Xevioso cepfi Pett & Jocqué, 2020 – Mozambique
- Xevioso colobata Griswold, 1990 – South Africa
- Xevioso jocquei Griswold, 1990 – Malawi
- Xevioso kulufa Griswold, 1990 – South Africa
- Xevioso lichmadina Griswold, 1990 – South Africa
- Xevioso megcummingae Pett & Jocqué, 2020 – Malawi, Zimbabwe
- Xevioso orthomeles Griswold, 1990 – Zimbabwe, Eswatini, South Africa
- Xevioso tuberculata (Lawrence, 1939) (type) – South Africa
- Xevioso zuluana (Lawrence, 1939) – South Africa
