= Phyxelida =

Scientific classification
- Kingdom: Animalia
- Phylum: Arthropoda
- Subphylum: Chelicerata
- Class: Arachnida
- Order: Araneae
- Infraorder: Araneomorphae
- Family: Phyxelididae
- Genus: Phyxelida; Simon, 1894

Type species
- P. makapanensis Simon, 1894

Species
- 17, see text

Synonyms
- Amphigyrioides Strand, 1913; Haemilla Simon, 1909

Genus of spiders

Phyxelida is a genus of araneomorph spiders in the family Phyxelididae, and was first described by Eugène Louis Simon in 1894.

== Description ==
Phyxelida are small to large spiders with total lengths ranging from 3 to 13 mm. The carapace is wider than long, with a thoracic fovea that is usually broad and deep but may be narrowed posteriorly or rectangular. The abdomen displays variable dorsal markings, while the venter shows longitudinal bands that range from faint to very broad and elaborate. The legs are long to elongate.

== Species ==
As of September 2025 it contains seventeen species, found in Africa, Israel, on Cyprus, and in Turkey:

- Phyxelida abyssinica Griswold, 1990 – Ethiopia
- Phyxelida anatolica Griswold, 1990 – Cyprus, Turkey, Israel
- Phyxelida apwania Griswold, 1990 – Kenya, Tanzania
- Phyxelida bifoveata (Strand, 1913) – East Africa
- Phyxelida carcharata Griswold, 1990 – Kenya
- Phyxelida crassibursa Griswold, 1990 – Kenya
- Phyxelida eurygyna Griswold, 1990 – Malawi
- Phyxelida irwini Griswold, 1990 – Kenya
- Phyxelida jabalina Griswold, 1990 – Tanzania
- Phyxelida kipia Griswold, 1990 – Tanzania
- Phyxelida makapanensis Simon, 1894 – South Africa (type species)
- Phyxelida mirabilis (L. Koch, 1875) – Ethiopia
- Phyxelida nebulosa (Tullgren, 1910) – Kenya, Tanzania
- Phyxelida pingoana Griswold, 1990 – Kenya
- Phyxelida sindanoa Griswold, 1990 – Kenya
- Phyxelida tanganensis (Simon & Fage, 1922) – Tanzania
- Phyxelida umlima Griswold, 1990 – Tanzania
