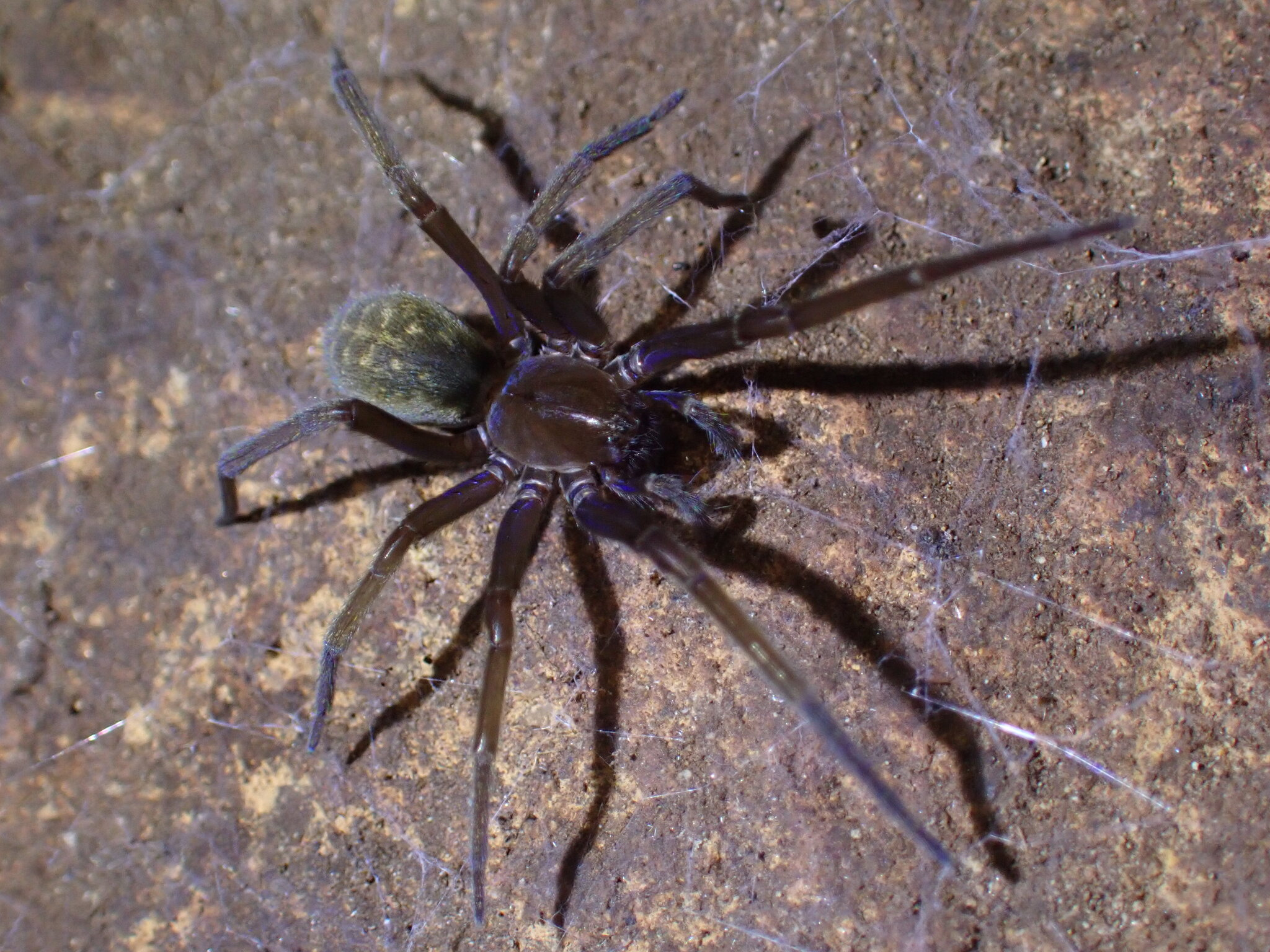
- female

Scientific classification
- Kingdom: Animalia
- Phylum: Arthropoda
- Subphylum: Chelicerata
- Class: Arachnida
- Order: Araneae
- Infraorder: Araneomorphae
- Family: Phyxelididae
- Genus: Matundua; Lehtinen, 1967
- Species: M. silvatica

Binomial name
- Matundua silvatica (Purcell, 1904)

Synonyms
- Auximus silvaticus Purcell, 1904

= Matundua =

Matundua Hackled Band Spider

Genus and species of spider

Matundua is a monotypic genus of South African araneomorph spiders in the family Phyxelididae, containing the single species, Matundua silvatica. It was first described by Pekka T. Lehtinen in 1967, and is endemic to South Africa.

== Distribution ==
Matundua silvatica is endemic to the Western Cape province of South Africa. It is known from Knysna and Diepwalle Forest Station, located 22 km northeast of Knysna.

== Habitat and ecology ==
The species is a ground retreat-web cryptic spider that lives in damp and dark places. It has been recorded from the Forest biome and is found beneath logs in moist forest at Diepwalle Forest Station and Knysna Forest. The species occurs at elevations ranging from 45 to 425 m above sea level. During 1985 sampling at Diepwalle, it was the most common cribellate spider found.

== Description ==
Matundua silvatica is known from both sexes and is a medium to large spider with a total length of 9-16 mm. The body and legs are hirsute. The carapace is orange-brown with dark sclerotized radii extending from the thoracic fovea on the thoracic area and along the pars cephalica margin. The cephalic region shades to red-brown anteriorly, and black pigment surrounds each eye. The anterior eye row is slightly recurved while the posterior eye row is straight. The pro- and retromargins of the fang furrow have 4-5 teeth.

The sternum is long with a sinuate margin, narrowed base, and blunt apex. The labium is long. The abdomen has a median light longitudinal band and median and postero-dorsal connected light chevrons, with the venter having narrow, entire longitudinal bands. The legs are elongate and unmarked, with a leg formula of 1423. The metatarsi lack apical combs, and the pseudocalamistrum is very weak to absent.

== Conservation ==
Matundua silvatica is listed as Data Deficient by SANBI. The species was originally described from specimens collected in 1896 and was recollected in 1985 from Diepwalle. More sampling is needed to determine the present species range. There are no significant threats to the species.

== Taxonomy ==
The species was originally described by Purcell in 1904 as Auximus silvaticus from Knysna and was subsequently revised by Griswold in 1990.
