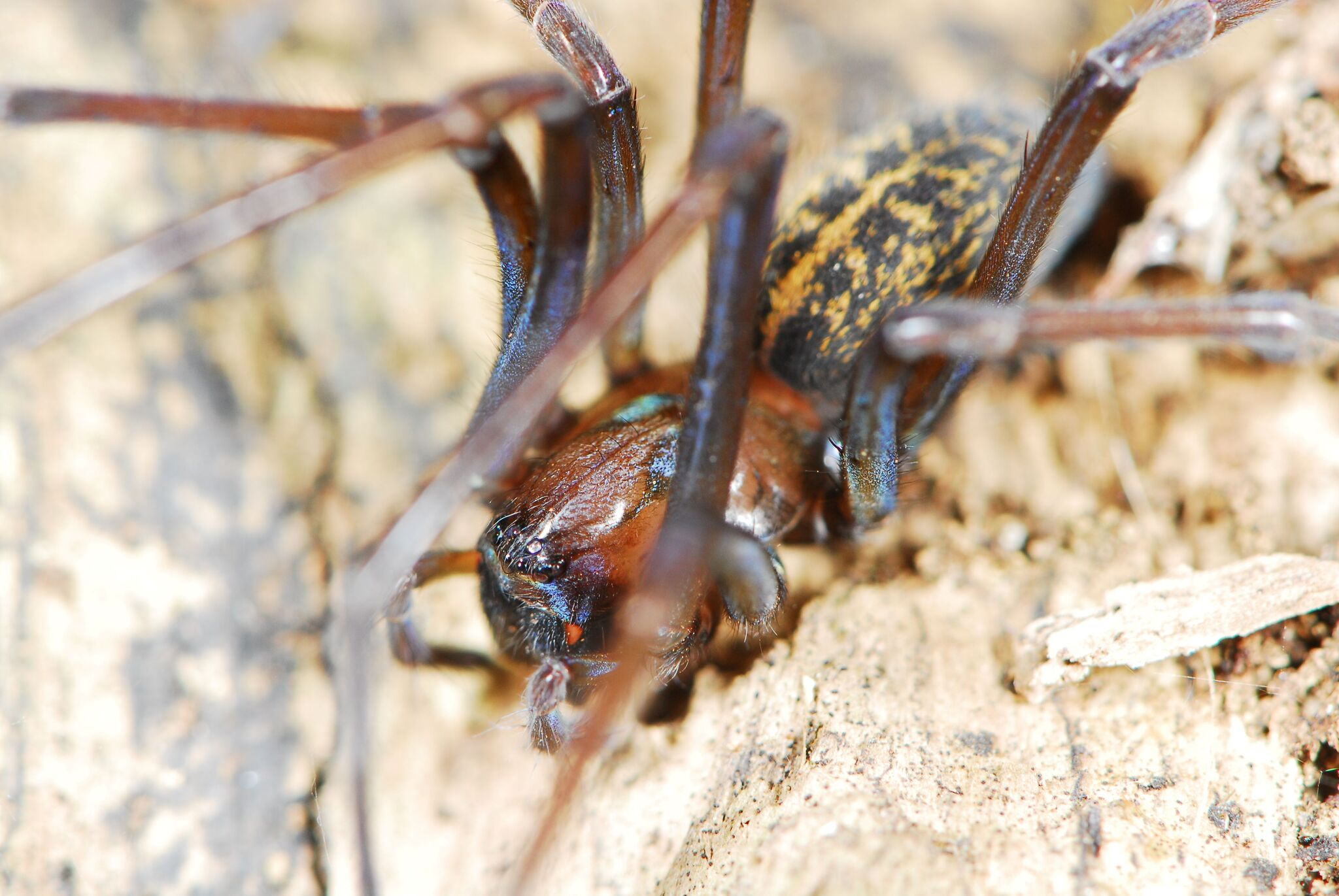
- female Themacrys irrorata
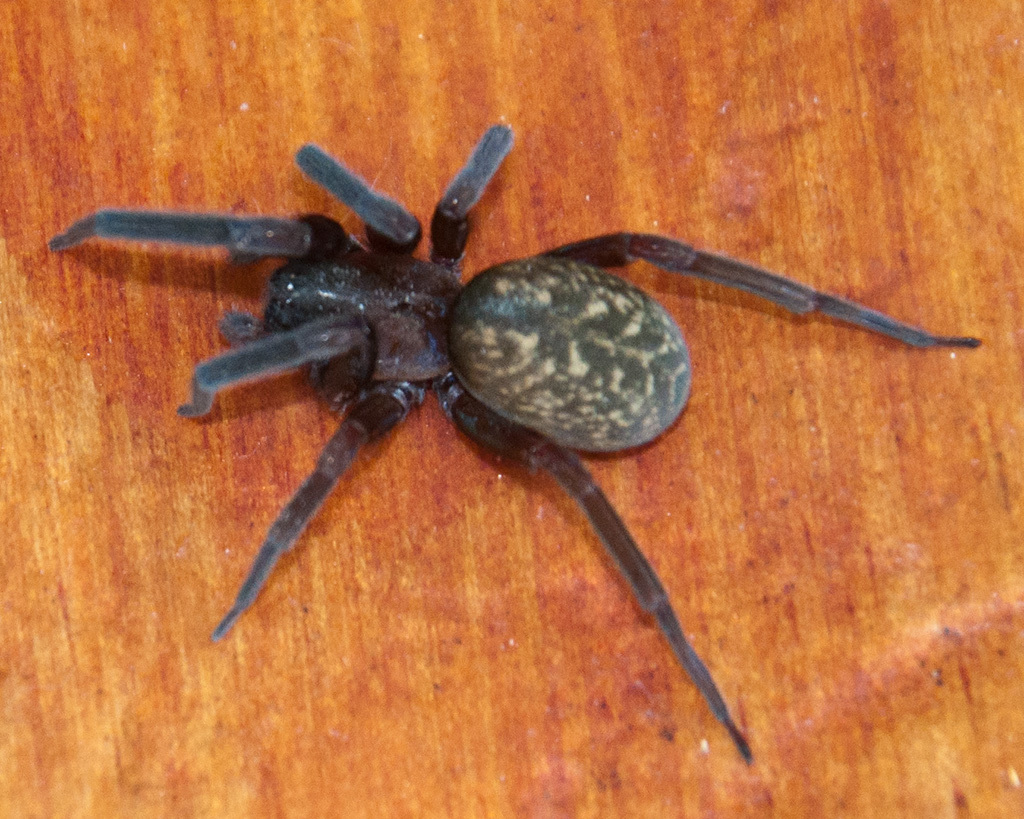
- female Vidole capensis

Scientific classification
- Kingdom: Animalia
- Phylum: Arthropoda
- Subphylum: Chelicerata
- Class: Arachnida
- Order: Araneae
- Infraorder: Araneomorphae
- Family: Phyxelididae; Lehtinen, 1967

Diversity
- 14 genera, 68 species
- blue: reported countries (WSC)

= Phyxelididae =

Lace web spiders

Family of spiders

Phyxelididae is a family of araneomorph spiders first described by Pekka T. Lehtinen in 1967 as a subfamily of Amaurobiidae, and later elevated to family status as a sister group of Titanoecidae.

== Life style ==
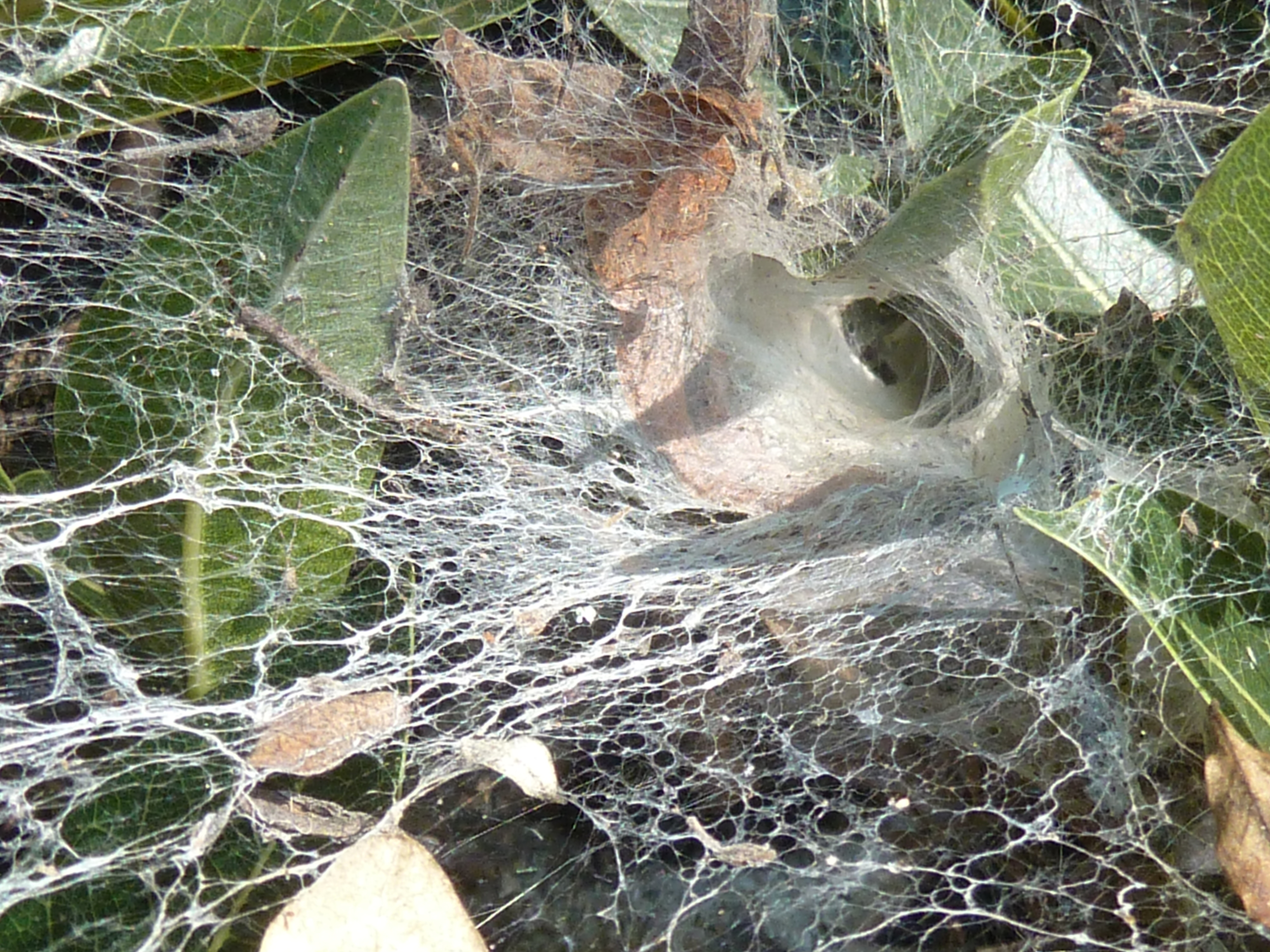
Funnel web with funnel wedged between leaves of a wild fig

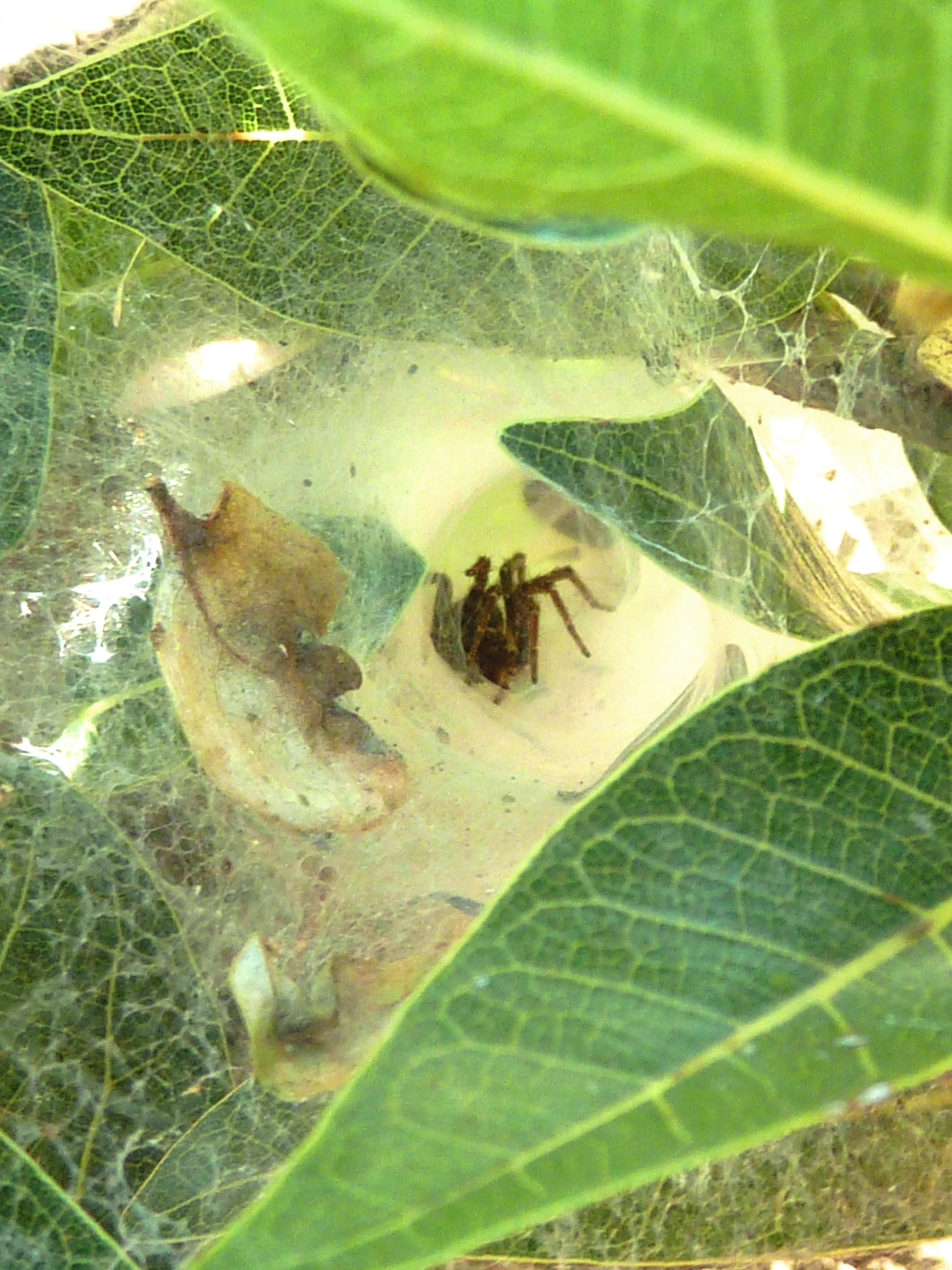
The central funnel section of the web

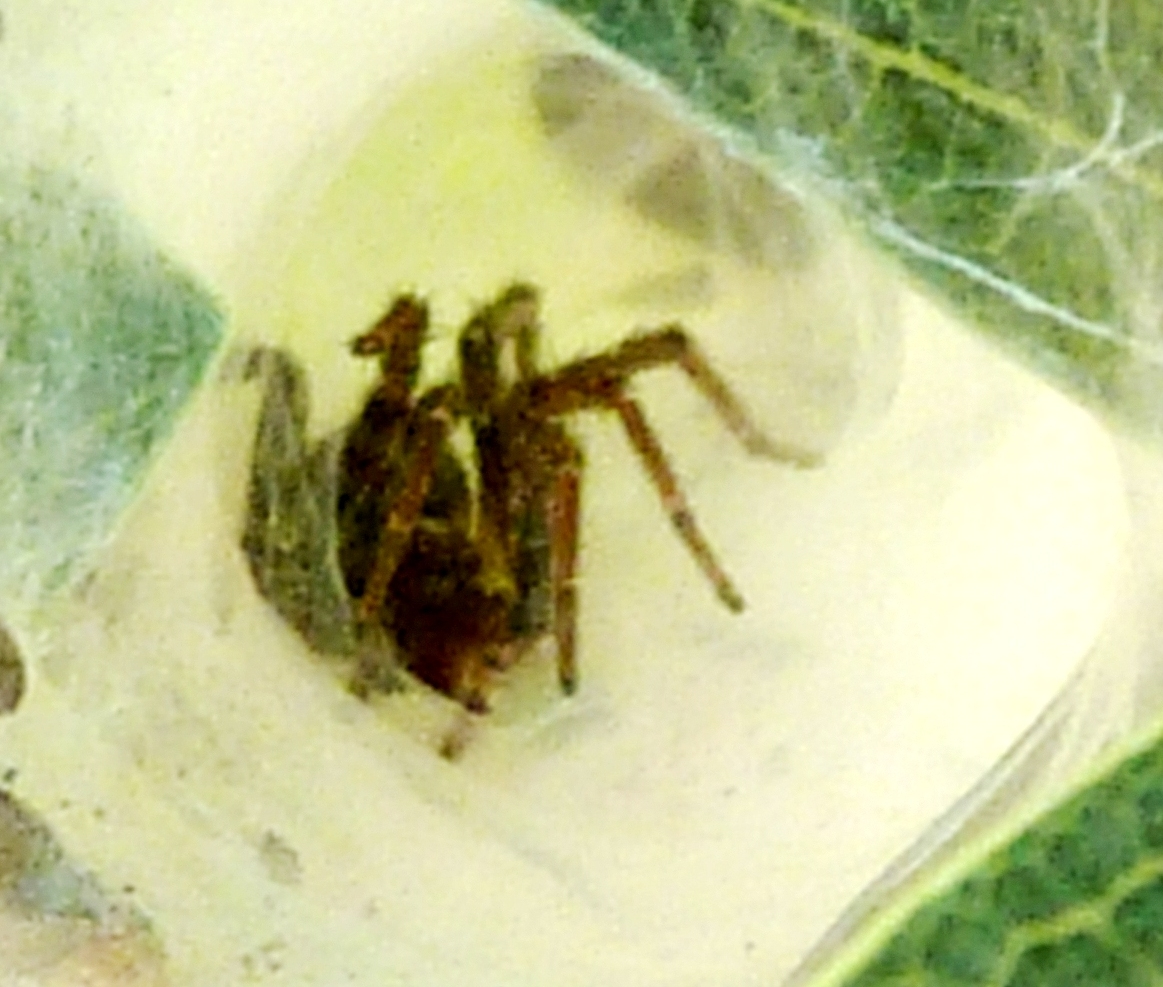
Female in silk tunnel

== Genera ==
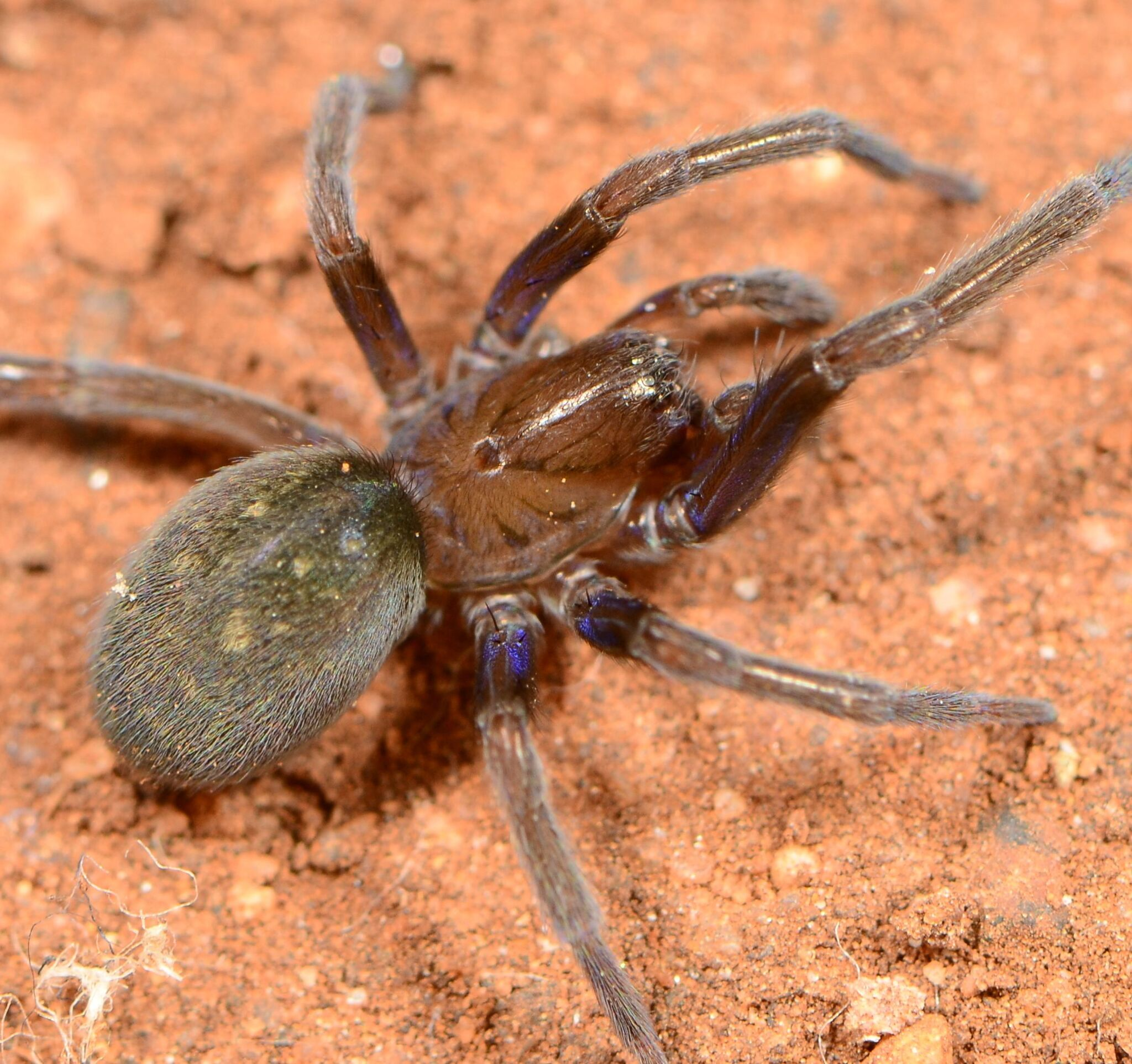
female Vidole sothoana

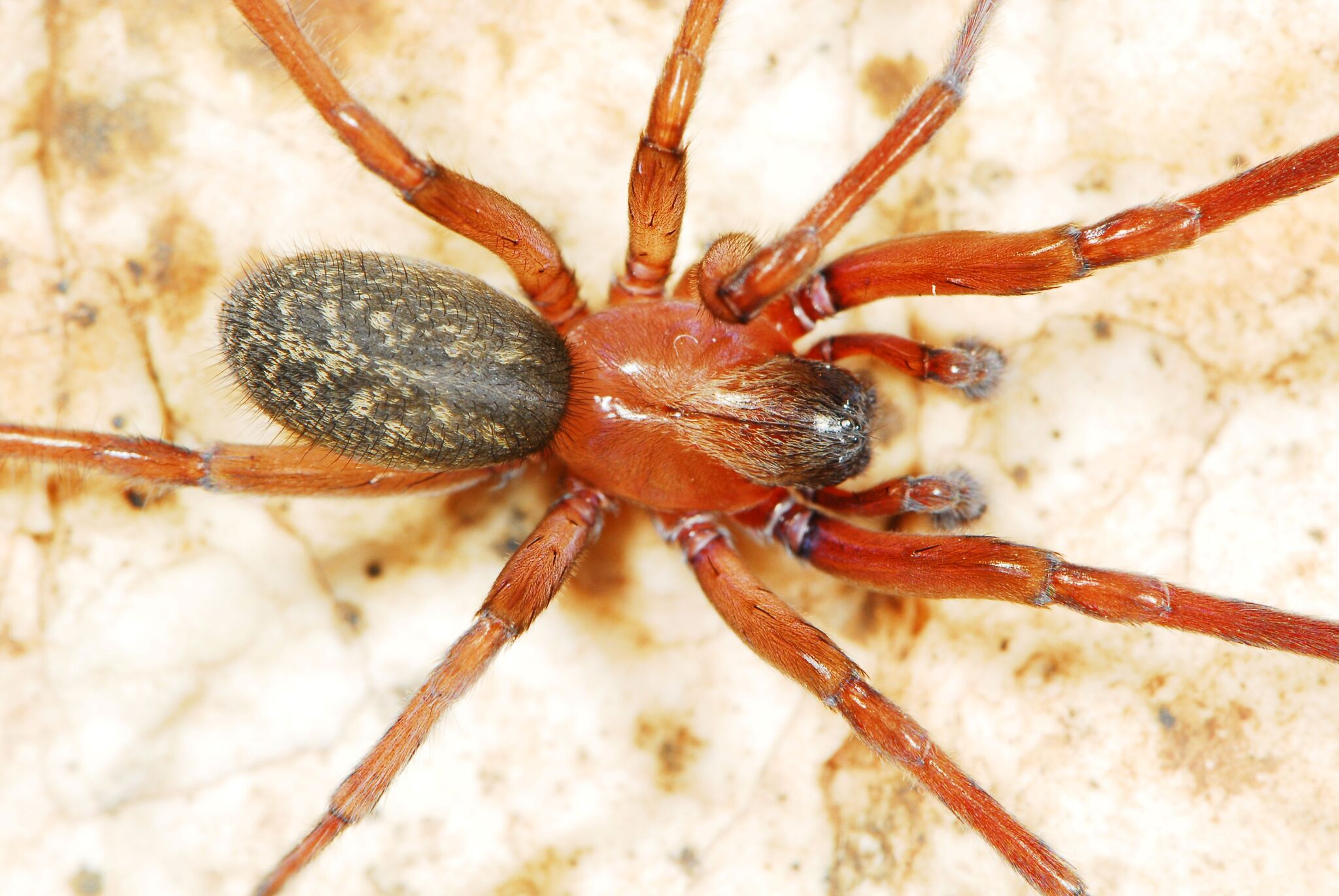
male V. sothoana

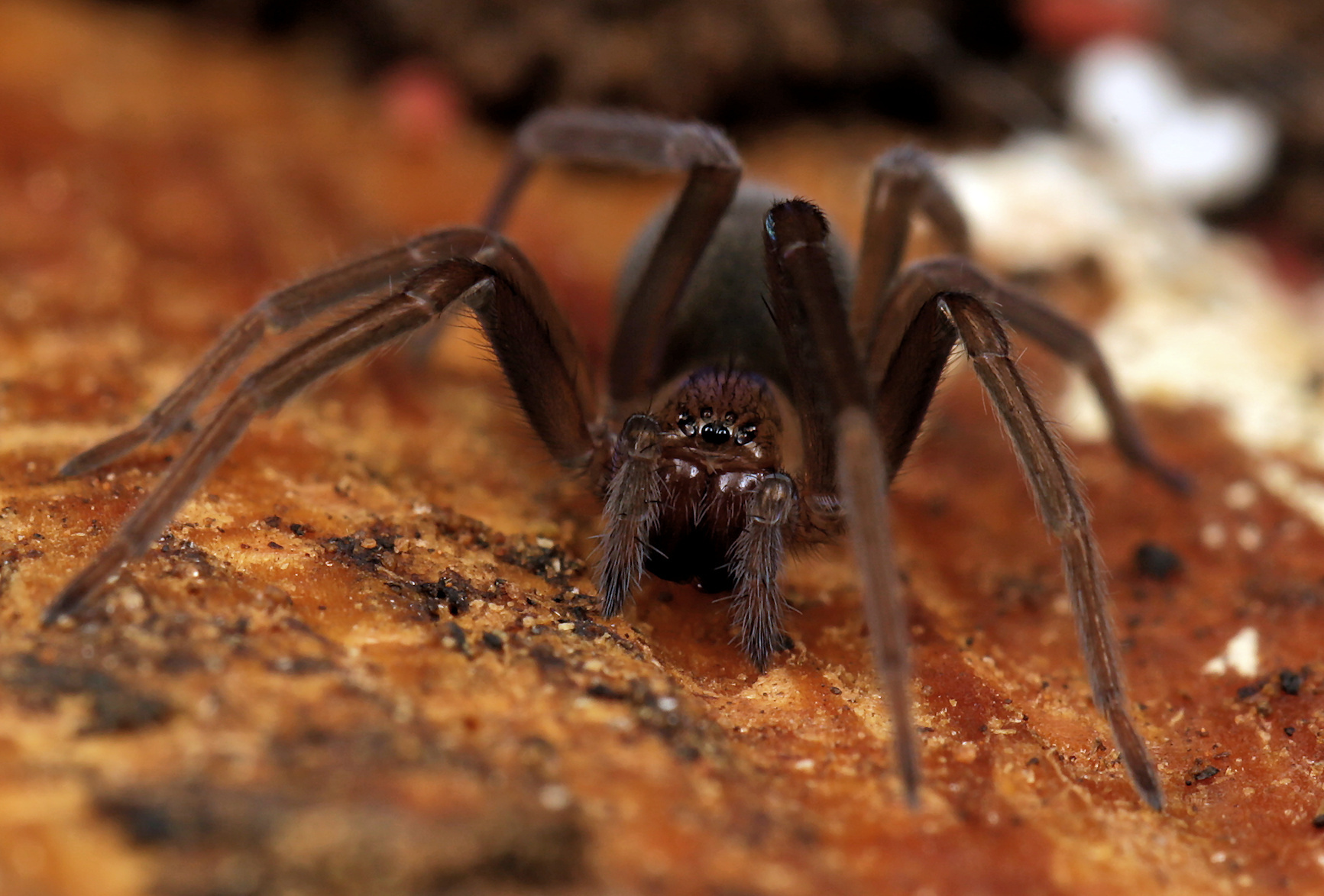
Xevioso orthomeles

As of January 2026, this family includes fourteen genera and 68 species:

- Ambohima Griswold, 1990 – Madagascar
- Kulalania Griswold, 1990 – Kenya
- Lamaika Griswold, 1990 – South Africa
- Malaika Lehtinen, 1967 – South Africa
- Manampoka Griswold, Wood & Carmichael, 2012 – Madagascar
- Matundua Lehtinen, 1967 – South Africa
- Namaquarachne Griswold, 1990 – South Africa
- Phyxelida Simon, 1894 – Eastern Africa, South Africa, Israel, Turkey, Cyprus, East Africa
- Pongolania Griswold, 1990 – South Africa
- Rahavavy Griswold, Wood & Carmichael, 2012 – Madagascar
- Themacrys Simon, 1906 – Lesotho, South Africa
- Vidole Lehtinen, 1967 – Lesotho, South Africa
- Vytfutia Deeleman-Reinhold, 1986 – Madagascar, Indonesia, Malaysia
- Xevioso Lehtinen, 1967 – Malawi, Mozambique, Eswatini, South Africa, Zimbabwe

== See also ==
- Titanoecoidea
