= List of Cyatholipidae species =

This page lists all described species of the spider family Cyatholipidae accepted by the World Spider Catalog as of February 2021:

== A ==
=== Alaranea ===
Alaranea Griswold, 1997

- A. alba Griswold, 1997 — Madagascar
- A. ardua Griswold, 1997 — Madagascar
- A. betsileo Griswold, 1997 — Madagascar
- A. merina Griswold, 1997 (type) — Madagascar

== B ==
=== † Balticolipus ===
† Balticolipus Wunderlich, 2004

- † B. kruemmeri Wunderlich, 2004

=== Buibui ===
Buibui Griswold, 2001

- B. abyssinica Griswold, 2001 — Ethiopia
- B. claviger Griswold, 2001 (type) — Kenya
- B. cyrtata Griswold, 2001 — Congo
- B. kankamelos Griswold, 2001 — Cameroon, Equatorial Guinea (Bioko)
- B. orthoskelos Griswold, 2001 — Congo

== C ==
=== Cyatholipus ===
Cyatholipus Simon, 1894

- C. avus Griswold, 1987 — South Africa
- C. hirsutissimus Simon, 1894 (type) — South Africa
- C. icubatus Griswold, 1987 — South Africa
- C. isolatus Griswold, 1987 — South Africa
- C. quadrimaculatus Simon, 1894 — South Africa
- C. tortilis Griswold, 1987 — South Africa

=== † Cyathosuccinus ===
† Cyathosuccinus Wunderlich, 2004

- † C. elongatus Wunderlich, 2004

== E ==
=== † Erigolipus ===
† Erigolipus Wunderlich, 2004

- † E. griswoldi Wunderlich, 2004

== F ==
=== Forstera ===
Forstera Koçak & Kemal, 2008

- F. daviesae (Forster, 1988) (type) — Australia (Queensland)

== H ==
=== Hanea ===
Hanea

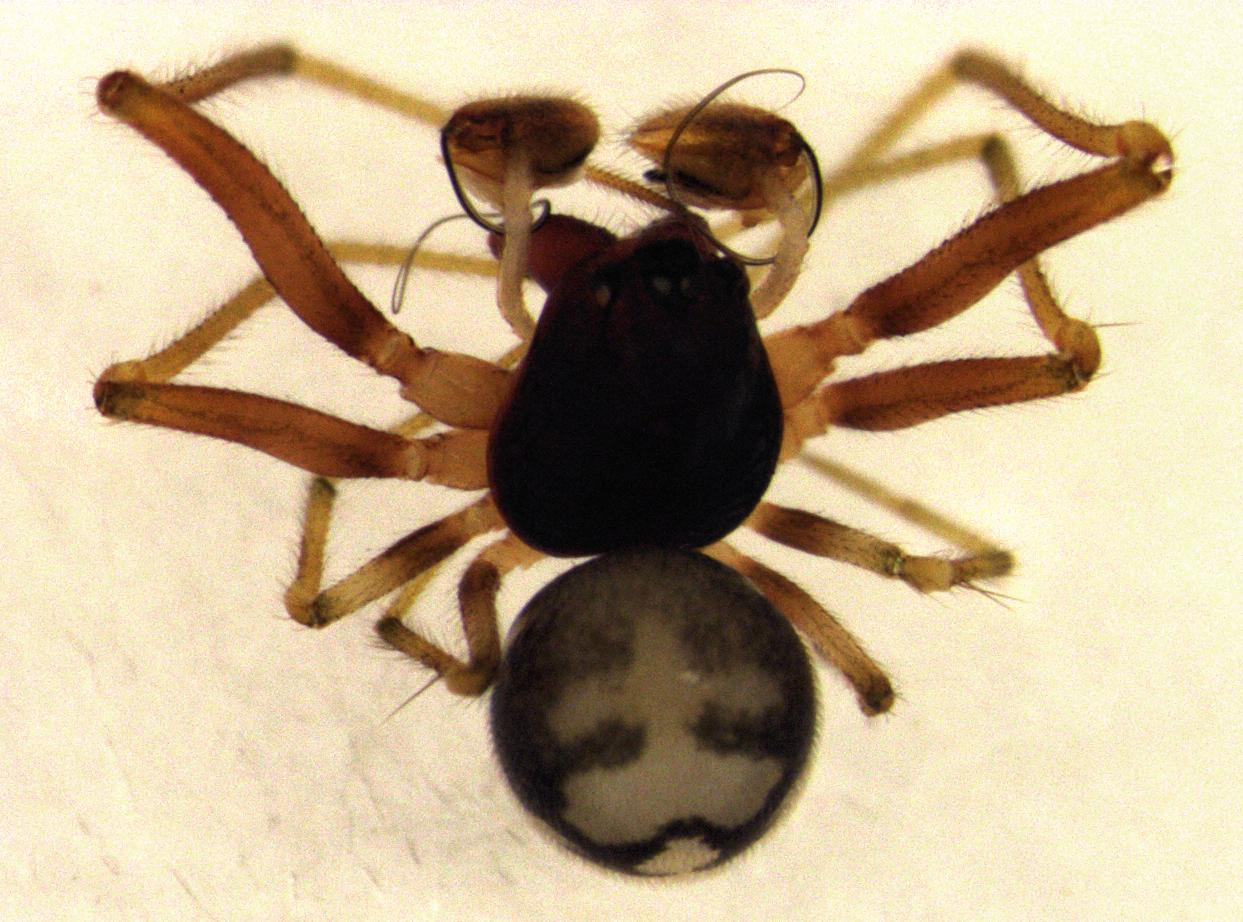
Hanea paturau

Hanea Forster, 1988

- H. paturau Forster, 1988 (type) — New Zealand

== I ==
=== Ilisoa ===
Ilisoa Griswold, 1987

- I. conjugalis Griswold, 2001 — South Africa
- I. hawequas Griswold, 1987 — South Africa
- I. knysna Griswold, 1987 (type) — South Africa

=== Isicabu ===
Isicabu Griswold, 1987

- I. henriki Griswold, 2001 — Tanzania
- I. kombo Griswold, 2001 — Tanzania
- I. margrethae Griswold, 2001 — Tanzania
- I. reavelli Griswold, 1987 (type) — South Africa
- I. zuluensis Griswold, 1987 — South Africa

== K ==
=== Kubwa ===
Kubwa Griswold, 2001

- K. singularis Griswold, 2001 (type) — Tanzania

== L ==
=== Lordhowea ===
Lordhowea Griswold, 2001

- L. nesiota Griswold, 2001 (type) — Australia (Lord Howe Is.)

== M ==
=== Matilda ===
Matilda Forster, 1988

- M. australia Forster, 1988 (type) — Australia (Queensland, New South Wales)

== P ==
=== Pembatatu ===
Pembatatu Griswold, 2001

- P. embamba Griswold, 2001 (type) — Kenya, Tanzania
- P. gongo Griswold, 2001 — Kenya
- P. mafuta Griswold, 2001 — Kenya

=== Pokennips ===
Pokennips Griswold, 2001

- P. dentipes (Simon, 1894) (type) — South Africa

== S ==
=== Scharffia ===
Scharffia Griswold, 1997

- S. chinja Griswold, 1997 (type) — Tanzania
- S. holmi Griswold, 1997 — Kenya
- S. nyasa Griswold, 1997 — Malawi
- S. rossi Griswold, 1997 — Tanzania

=== † Spinilipus ===
† Spinilipus Wunderlich, 1993

- † S. bispinosus Wunderlich, 2004
- † S. curvatus Wunderlich, 2004
- † S. glinki Wunderlich, 2004
- † S. kerneggeri Wunderlich, 1993
- † S. longembolus Wunderlich, 2004

=== † Succinilipus ===
† Succinilipus Wunderlich, 1993

- † S. abditus Wunderlich, 2004
- † S. aspinosus Wunderlich, 2004
- † S. saxoniensis Wunderlich, 1993
- † S. similis Wunderlich, 2004
- † S. teuberi Wunderlich, 1993

== T ==
=== Teemenaarus ===
Teemenaarus Davies, 1978

- T. silvestris Davies, 1978 (type) — Australia (Queensland)

=== Tekella ===
Tekella

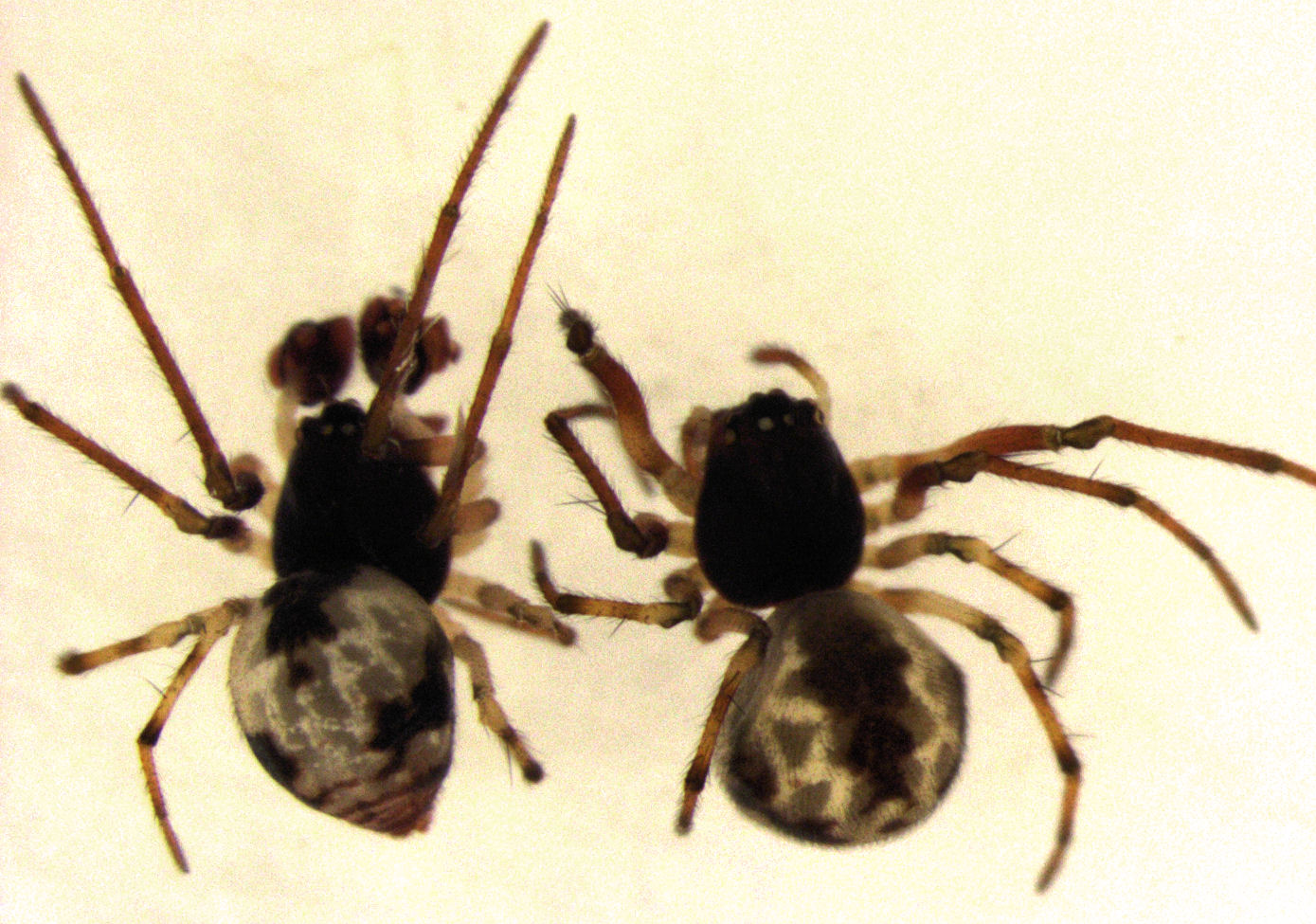
Tekella lineata

Tekella Urquhart, 1894

- T. absidata Urquhart, 1894 — New Zealand
- T. bisetosa Forster, 1988 — New Zealand
- T. lineata Forster, 1988 — New Zealand
- T. nemoralis (Urquhart, 1889) (type) — New Zealand
- T. unisetosa Forster, 1988 — New Zealand

=== Tekellatus ===
Tekellatus Wunderlich, 1978

- T. lamingtoniensis Wunderlich, 1978 (type) — Australia (Queensland)

=== Tekelloides ===
Tekelloides

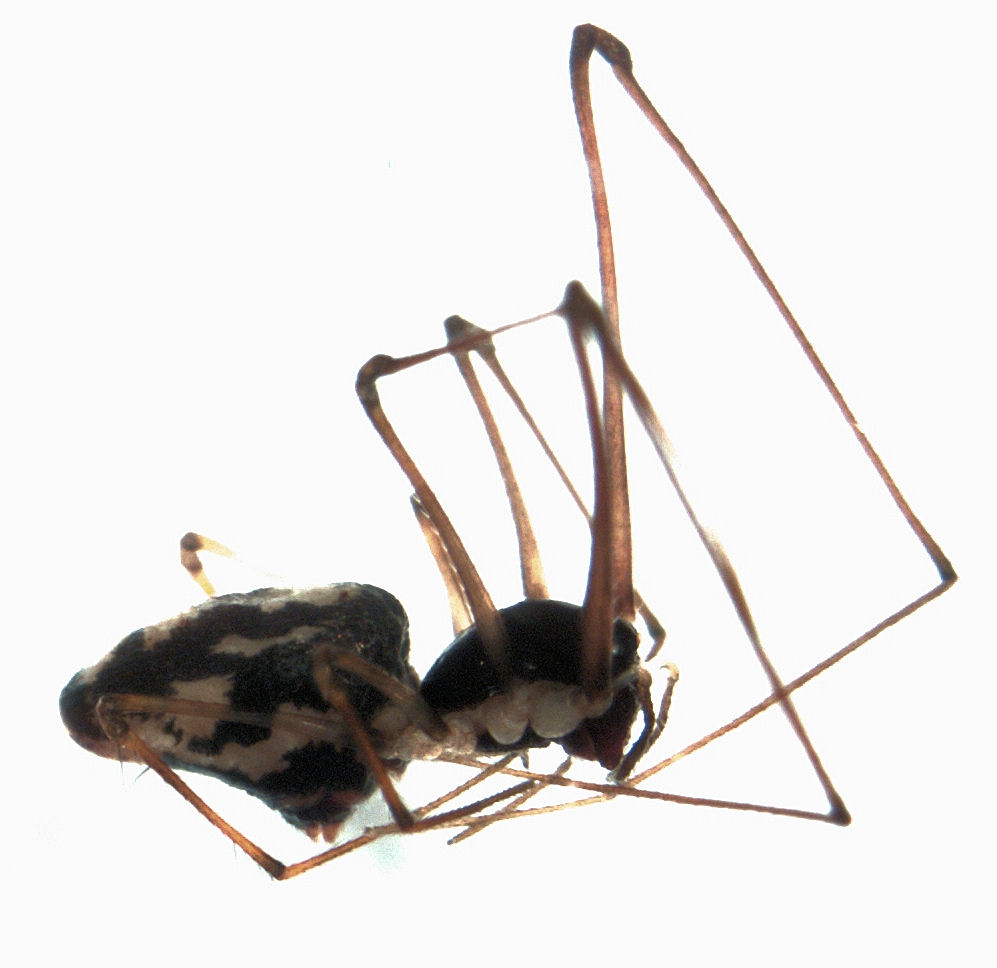
Tekelloides flavonotatus, female

Tekelloides Forster, 1988

- T. australis Forster, 1988 (type) — New Zealand
- T. flavonotatus (Urquhart, 1891) — New Zealand

== U ==
=== Ubacisi ===
Ubacisi Griswold, 2001

- U. capensis (Griswold, 1987) (type) — South Africa

=== Ulwembua ===
Ulwembua Griswold, 1987

- U. antsiranana Griswold, 1997 — Madagascar
- U. denticulata Griswold, 1987 — South Africa
- U. nigra Griswold, 2001 — Madagascar
- U. outeniqua Griswold, 1987 — South Africa
- U. pulchra Griswold, 1987 (type) — South Africa
- U. ranomafana Griswold, 1997 — Madagascar
- U. usambara Griswold, 2001 — Tanzania

=== Umwani ===
Umwani Griswold, 2001

- U. anymphos Griswold, 2001 — Malawi
- U. artigamos Griswold, 2001 (type) — Tanzania

=== Uvik ===
Uvik Griswold, 2001

- U. vulgaris Griswold, 2001 (type) — Congo, Uganda

== V ==
=== Vazaha ===
Vazaha Griswold, 1997

- V. toamasina Griswold, 1997 (type) — Madagascar

== W ==
=== Wanzia ===
Wanzia Griswold, 1998

- W. fako Griswold, 1998 (type) — Cameroon, Equatorial Guinea (Bioko)
