= Ulwembua outeniqua =

Outeniqua Tree Sheet-Web Spider

Conservation status
- Least Concern (SANBI Red List)

Scientific classification
- Kingdom: Animalia
- Phylum: Arthropoda
- Subphylum: Chelicerata
- Class: Arachnida
- Order: Araneae
- Infraorder: Araneomorphae
- Family: Cyatholipidae
- Genus: Ulwembua
- Species: U. outeniqua

Binomial name
- Ulwembua outeniqua Griswold, 1987

Species of spider

Ulwembua outeniqua is a species of spider in the family Cyatholipidae. It is endemic to South Africa and is found in the Western Cape and Eastern Cape provinces.

== Distribution ==
Ulwembua outeniqua is recorded from four protected areas across two provinces. In the Western Cape, it occurs at Big Tree and Kranshoek near Knysna, Diepwalle Forest Station, Harkerville State Forest, Nature's Valley, and Grootvadersbosch Nature Reserve. In the Eastern Cape, it is found in Tsitsikamma National Park. The species occurs at elevations between 8 and 503 metres above sea level.

== Habitat ==
The species is abundant in wet, closed-canopy forests where it builds sheet webs less than 50 centimetres from the ground on low vegetation and tree buttresses. It is found in the Forest Biome.

== Etymology ==
The species is named after the Outeniqua Mountains, which form part of its range in the southern Cape.

== Conservation ==
All known collections are from protected areas and the species shows no signs of decline. It is listed as being of Least Concern.
