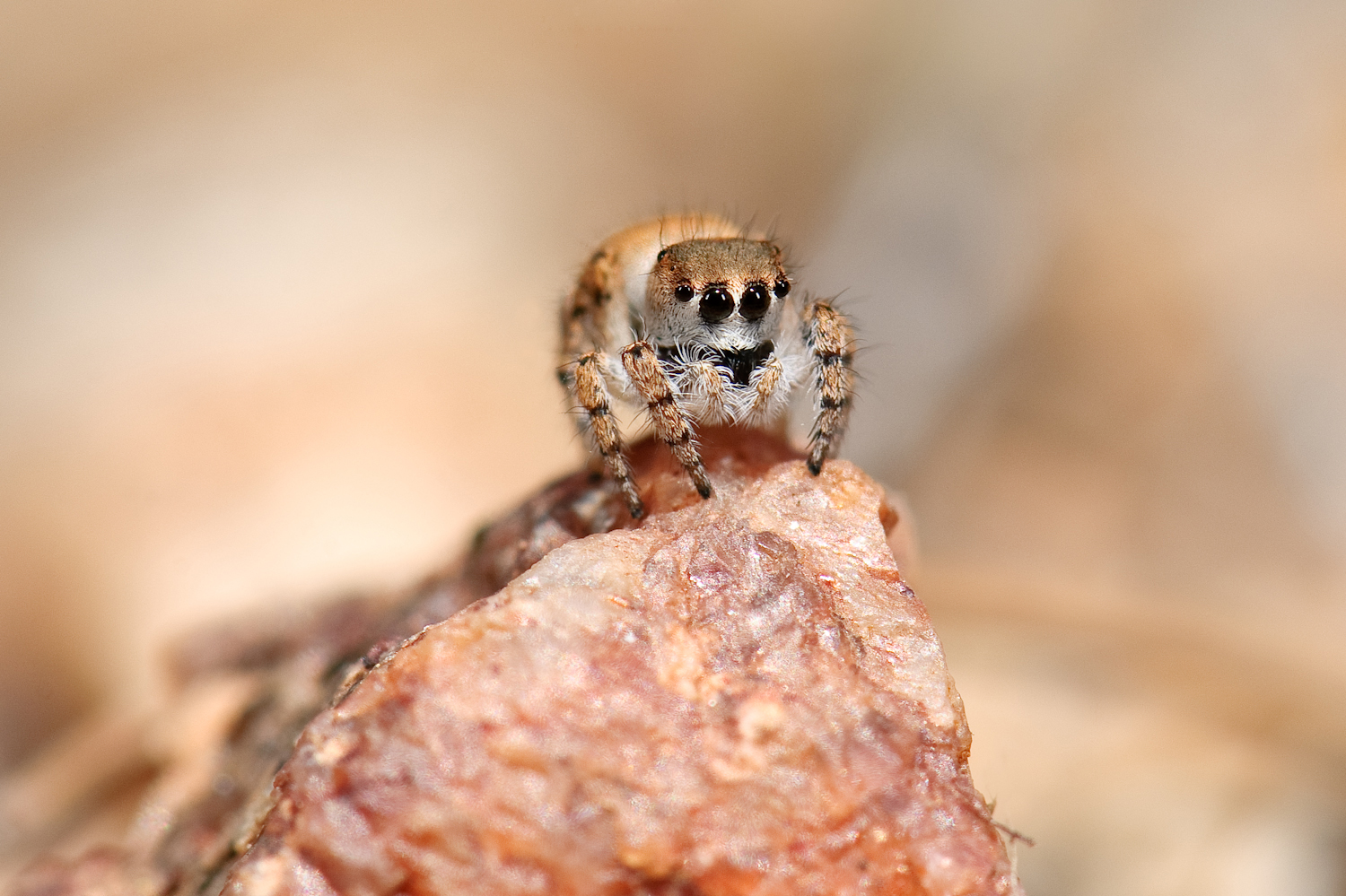

Scientific classification
- Kingdom: Animalia
- Phylum: Arthropoda
- Subphylum: Chelicerata
- Class: Arachnida
- Order: Araneae
- Infraorder: Araneomorphae
- Family: Salticidae
- Genus: Habronattus
- Species: H. ustulatus

Binomial name
- Habronattus ustulatus (Griswold, 1979)

= Habronattus ustulatus =

Species of spider

Habronattus ustulatus is a species of spider in the family Salticidae. It is found in the USA and Mexico.

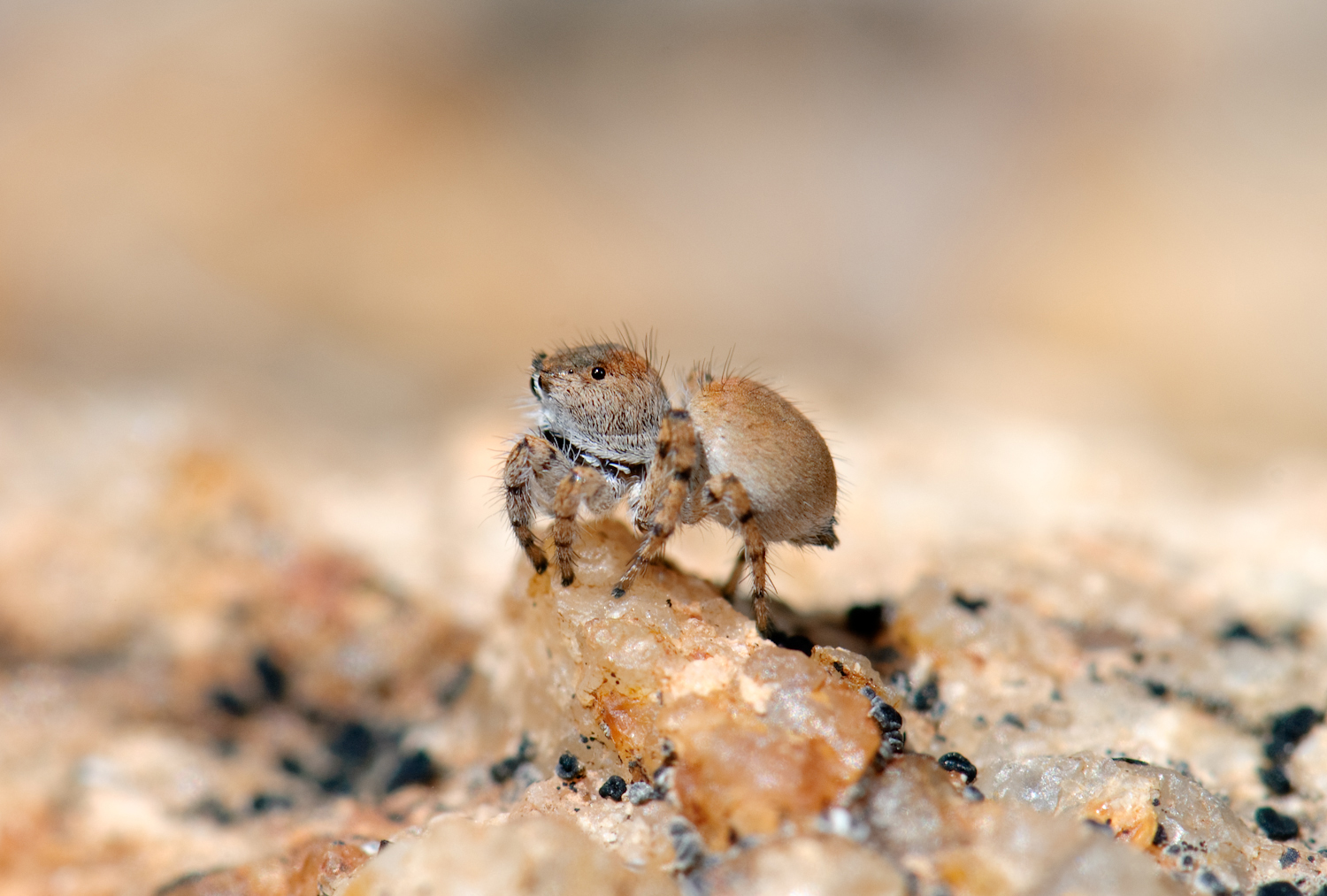

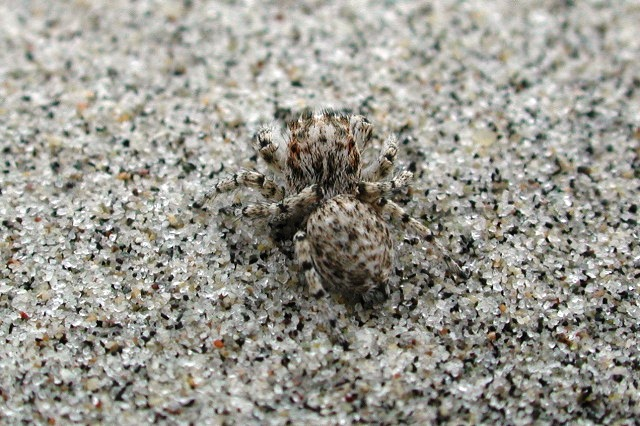
