= Cyatholipus icubatus =

Scientific classification
- Kingdom: Animalia
- Phylum: Arthropoda
- Subphylum: Chelicerata
- Class: Arachnida
- Order: Araneae
- Infraorder: Araneomorphae
- Family: Cyatholipidae
- Genus: Cyatholipus
- Species: C. icubatus

Binomial name
- Cyatholipus icubatus Griswold, 1987

Species of spider

Cyatholipus icubatus is a species of spider in the family Cyatholipidae. It is endemic to KwaZulu-Natal province of South Africa.

== Distribution ==
Cyatholipus icubatus is known from three locations in KwaZulu-Natal: Dlinza Forest near Eshowe, Ngome State Forest, and Ithala Game Reserve. The species occurs at elevations between 512 and 1314 metres above sea level.

== Habitat ==
The species builds small horizontal sheet webs in the understory of moist forests. It has been sampled from the Savanna Biome using pitfall traps.

== Conservation ==
The species is protected in three protected areas but is likely threatened by habitat loss outside these areas due to crop cultivation and deforestation for fuelwood. It is currently listed as Data Deficient due to limited sampling and the fact that only females are known.
