= Noideattella =

Scientific classification
- Kingdom: Animalia
- Phylum: Arthropoda
- Subphylum: Chelicerata
- Class: Arachnida
- Order: Araneae
- Infraorder: Araneomorphae
- Family: Oonopidae
- Genus: Noideattella; Griswold

Species
- 13, see text

Genus of spiders

Noideattella is a genus of spiders in the family Oonopidae. It was first described in 2012 by Álvarez-Padilla, Ubick & Griswold. As of 2017, it contains 13 species from Madagascar and related islands.

== Species ==
Noideattella comprises the following species:

- Noideattella amboa Álvarez-Padilla, Ubick & Griswold, 2012
- Noideattella assumptia (Saaristo, 2001)
- Noideattella famafa Álvarez-Padilla, Ubick & Griswold, 2012
- Noideattella fantara Álvarez-Padilla, Ubick & Griswold, 2012
- Noideattella farihy Álvarez-Padilla, Ubick & Griswold, 2012
- Noideattella gamela Álvarez-Padilla, Ubick & Griswold, 2012
- Noideattella lakana Álvarez-Padilla, Ubick & Griswold, 2012
- Noideattella mamba Álvarez-Padilla, Ubick & Griswold, 2012
- Noideattella omby Álvarez-Padilla, Ubick & Griswold, 2015
- Noideattella saka Álvarez-Padilla, Ubick & Griswold, 2012
- Noideattella sylvnata Álvarez-Padilla, Ubick & Griswold, 2015
- Noideattella tany Álvarez-Padilla, Ubick & Griswold, 2012
- Noideattella tsiba Álvarez-Padilla, Ubick & Griswold, 2012
