= Isicabu zuluensis =

Tailed Tree Sheet-Web Spider

Conservation status
- Vulnerable (SANBI Red List)

Scientific classification
- Kingdom: Animalia
- Phylum: Arthropoda
- Subphylum: Chelicerata
- Class: Arachnida
- Order: Araneae
- Infraorder: Araneomorphae
- Family: Cyatholipidae
- Genus: Isicabu
- Species: I. zuluensis

Binomial name
- Isicabu zuluensis Griswold, 1987

Species of spider

Isicabu zuluensis is a species of spider in the family Cyatholipidae. It is endemic to KwaZulu-Natal province of South Africa.

== Distribution ==
Isicabu zuluensis is known from four locations in KwaZulu-Natal: Dukuduku Forest Station, Ngome State Forest, Town Bush Forest near Pietermaritzburg, and Richards Bay. The species occurs at elevations between 61 and 1155 metres above sea level.

== Habitat ==
The species builds small horizontal sheet webs in the understory of moist forests. It occurs in Forest, Indian Ocean Coastal Belt, and Savanna biomes and has also been found in pine plantations.

== Etymology ==
The species epithet zuluensis refers to Zululand (the historical name for northern KwaZulu-Natal), where the species was discovered.

== Conservation ==
The species is protected in two areas but is threatened by ongoing habitat loss due to crop cultivation throughout much of its range. It is listed as Vulnerable.
