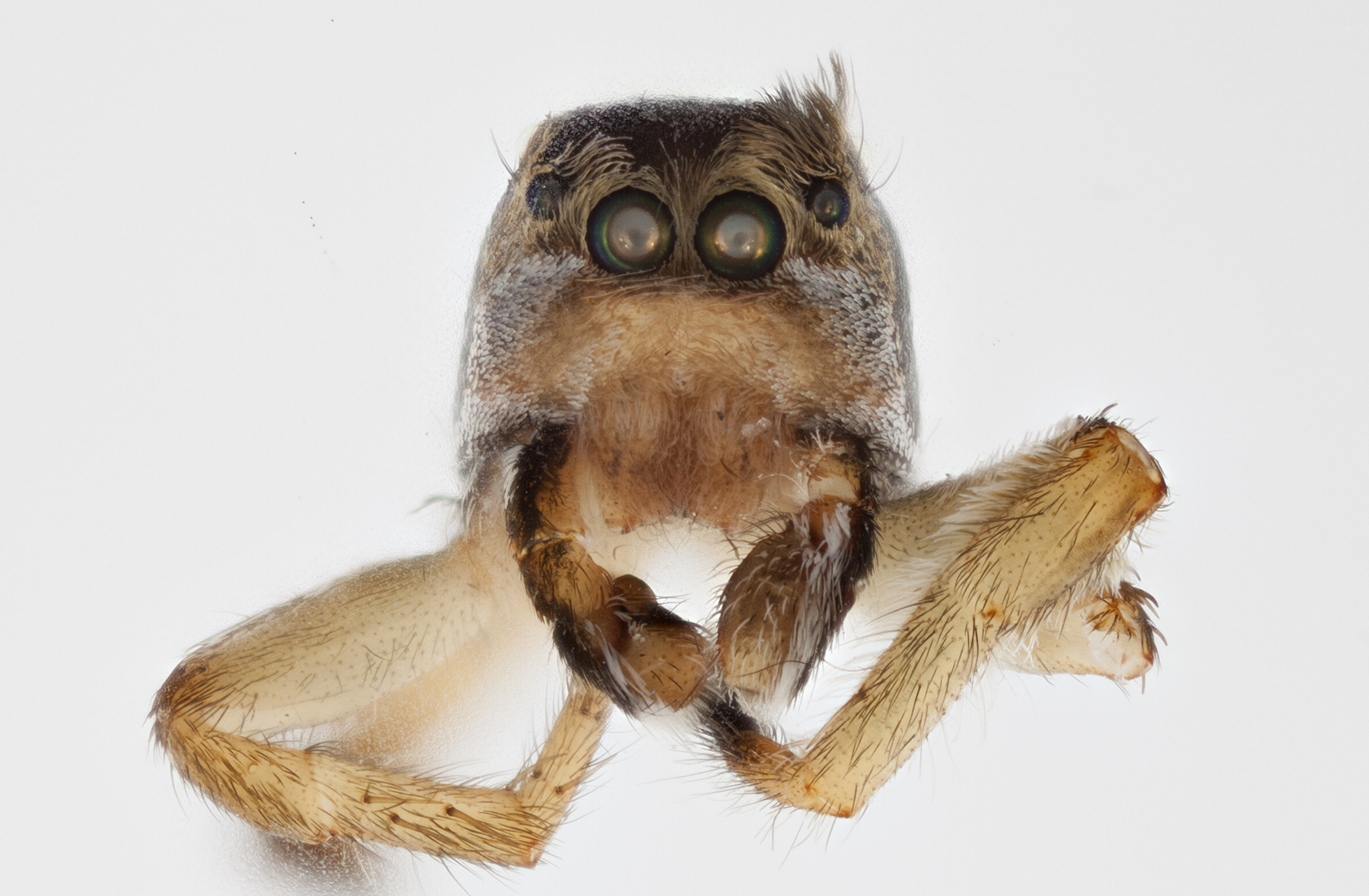

Scientific classification
- Kingdom: Animalia
- Phylum: Arthropoda
- Subphylum: Chelicerata
- Class: Arachnida
- Order: Araneae
- Infraorder: Araneomorphae
- Family: Salticidae
- Genus: Habronattus
- Species: H. ophrys

Binomial name
- Habronattus ophrys Griswold, 1987

= Habronattus ophrys =

Species of spider

Habronattus ophrys is a species of spider from the family Salticidae found in the United States.

== Description ==
The spider is black coloured, with orange middle.
