= Lordhowea =

Lordhowea is a generic name that may refer to:

- Lordhowea (plant), a genus of plants native to Australia and Lord Howe Island
- a monotypic genus of spiders with the sole species Lordhowea nesiota, native to Australia
