= Cyatholipus isolatus =

Hanglip Tree Sheet-Web Spider

Conservation status
- Near Threatened (SANBI Red List)

Scientific classification
- Kingdom: Animalia
- Phylum: Arthropoda
- Subphylum: Chelicerata
- Class: Arachnida
- Order: Araneae
- Infraorder: Araneomorphae
- Family: Cyatholipidae
- Genus: Cyatholipus
- Species: C. isolatus

Binomial name
- Cyatholipus isolatus Griswold, 1987

Species of spider

Cyatholipus isolatus is a species of spider in the family Cyatholipidae. It is endemic to South Africa and is found in Limpopo and Mpumalanga provinces.

== Distribution ==
Cyatholipus isolatus is known from five locations across two provinces. In Limpopo, it has been recorded from Hanglip Forest, Lhuvhondo Nature Reserve, and Vhembe Biosphere Reserve. In Mpumalanga, it occurs in Kruger National Park. The species is found at elevations between 573 and 1393 metres above sea level.

== Habitat ==
The species builds small horizontal sheet webs in the understory of moist forests. Some specimens have been found under loose bark. It occurs in both Forest and Savanna biomes.

== Etymology ==
The species epithet isolatus is Latin meaning "isolated", referring to its restricted forest habitat.

== Conservation ==
The species is protected in two protected areas but faces threats from habitat loss due to agricultural activities and mining. Planned coal mining in parts of the Soutpansberg mountains poses a future threat. The species is listed as Near Threatened.
