= Cyatholipus tortilis =

Conservation status
- Least Concern (IUCN 3.1)

Scientific classification
- Kingdom: Animalia
- Phylum: Arthropoda
- Subphylum: Chelicerata
- Class: Arachnida
- Order: Araneae
- Infraorder: Araneomorphae
- Family: Cyatholipidae
- Genus: Cyatholipus
- Species: C. tortilis

Binomial name
- Cyatholipus tortilis Griswold, 1987

Species of spider

Cyatholipus tortilis, commonly known as the Cathedral Peak tree sheet-web spider, is a species of spider in the family Cyatholipidae. It is endemic to KwaZulu-Natal province of South Africa.

== Distribution ==
Cyatholipus tortilis is known only from Cathedral Peak in the Ukahlamba Drakensberg World Heritage site, where it occurs at approximately 1649 metres above sea level.

== Habitat ==
The species builds small horizontal sheet webs in vegetation and was collected from open montane grasses in the Grassland Biome. This habitat is seasonally wet and interlaced with permanent streams that harbour tree ferns and other mesic vegetation.

== Etymology ==
The species epithet tortilis is Latin meaning "twisted" or "coiled".

== Conservation ==
The species is known only from the type locality and only males have been collected. It occurs in a protected area with no obvious threats and is listed as Rare. The species is likely under-collected and may occur more widely in the Drakensberg mountain range.
