= Habronattus ballatoris =

Scientific classification
- Kingdom: Animalia
- Phylum: Arthropoda
- Subphylum: Chelicerata
- Class: Arachnida
- Order: Araneae
- Infraorder: Araneomorphae
- Family: Salticidae
- Genus: Habronattus
- Species: H. ballatoris

Binomial name
- Habronattus ballatoris Griswold, 1987

Species of spider

Habronattus ballatoris is a species of jumping spider (family Salticidae). It is found in the United States.
