= Noideattella tsiba =

Scientific classification
- Kingdom: Animalia
- Phylum: Arthropoda
- Subphylum: Chelicerata
- Class: Arachnida
- Order: Araneae
- Infraorder: Araneomorphae
- Family: Oonopidae
- Genus: Noideattella
- Species: N. tsiba

Binomial name
- Noideattella tsiba Álvarez-Padilla, Ubick & Griswold, 2012

Species of spider

Noideattella tsiba is a species of araneomorph spider in the family Oonopidae, (also called "goblin spiders"). This species can only be found on the African island Madagascar. Two individual specimens were collected when the species was first discovered. The first was a male holotype which measured 1.4 mm across. The other, a female paratype measured 1.6 mm.

== Taxonomy and naming ==
N. tsiba was first reported from Madagascar in 2012, and its discovery was part of a project called the Goblin Spider Planetary Biodiversity Inventory. The report also named the genera Noideatella (to which N. tsiba belongs) and Tolegnaro. While 11 species were reported within Noideatella in this report, only two species were reported from Tolegnaro.

== Evolution ==
N. tsiba appears to be most closely related to N. saka and N. lanaka. A cladistic analysis done in between the 11 species of Noideatella and two species of Tolegnaro supports a monophyletic relationship between these genera. This means that the common ancestor of Noideatella and Tolegnaro likely share a common ancestor within the Oonopid family. The Oonpid spiders have a fossil record dating back to the early Cretaceous Period (specifically the Albian faunal stage. Madagascar began to separate from Africa well ahead of the early Cretaceous. Given that N. tsiba, the rest of its genus, and the genus Tolegnaro are all endemic to Madagascar, it is likely that the Noideatella-Tolegnaro common ancestor was present on Madagascar after the island had rifted away from Africa.

== Distribution and habitat ==
While only two specimens were initially collected, N. tsiba has been observed in nine locations- eight of which are in the northernmost region of Madagascar. The ninth observation took place in the southeast portion of the island. The collected specimens were found living in leaf litter on the floor of a dry tropical forest (Forêt de Binara in Antsiranana Province).
