= Cyatholipus avus =

Scientific classification
- Kingdom: Animalia
- Phylum: Arthropoda
- Subphylum: Chelicerata
- Class: Arachnida
- Order: Araneae
- Infraorder: Araneomorphae
- Family: Cyatholipidae
- Genus: Cyatholipus
- Species: C. avus

Binomial name
- Cyatholipus avus Griswold, 1987

Species of spider

Cyatholipus avus is a species of spider in the family Cyatholipidae. It is endemic to the Western Cape province of South Africa.

== Distribution ==
Cyatholipus avus is known from several localities in the Western Cape, including Grootvadersbosch, Marloth Nature Reserve near Swellendam, Fernkloof Nature Reserve, and Kogelberg Nature Reserve. The species occurs at elevations between 230 and 653 metres above sea level.

== Habitat ==
The species inhabits moist montane forests of the Forest Biome. Like other members of its genus, it builds small horizontal sheet webs in vegetation between tree trunks and surrounding low shrubs or within tree buttresses.

== Etymology ==
The species epithet avus is Latin meaning "grandfather", referring to Grootvadersbosch (Grandfather's Bush), the type locality.

== Conservation ==
Cyatholipus avus is protected in three protected areas and has a relatively wide distribution with no known threats. The species is considered to be of Least Concern.
