= Ilisoa conjugalis =

Conservation status
- Least Concern (IUCN 3.1)

Scientific classification
- Kingdom: Animalia
- Phylum: Arthropoda
- Subphylum: Chelicerata
- Class: Arachnida
- Order: Araneae
- Infraorder: Araneomorphae
- Family: Cyatholipidae
- Genus: Ilisoa
- Species: I. conjugalis

Binomial name
- Ilisoa conjugalis Griswold, 2001

Species of spider

Ilisoa conjugalis, commonly known as the Buffelsbay tree sheet-web sSpider, is a species of spider in the family Cyatholipidae. It is endemic to the Western Cape province of South Africa.

== Distribution ==
Ilisoa conjugalis is known from three localities on the Cape Peninsula: Buffelsbay, Kalkbaai, and Cape Point in Table Mountain National Park. It occurs at approximately 77 metres above sea level.

== Habitat ==
The species builds small horizontal sheet webs in vegetation on sand dunes in the Fynbos Biome.

== Etymology ==
The species epithet conjugalis is Latin meaning "conjugal" or "of marriage".

== Conservation ==
The species has a small, restricted distribution and is listed as Rare. It is protected within Table Mountain National Park, where threats from coastal development have been mitigated.
