= Isicabu reavelli =

Scientific classification
- Kingdom: Animalia
- Phylum: Arthropoda
- Subphylum: Chelicerata
- Class: Arachnida
- Order: Araneae
- Infraorder: Araneomorphae
- Family: Cyatholipidae
- Genus: Isicabu
- Species: I. reavelli

Binomial name
- Isicabu reavelli Griswold, 1987

Species of spider

Isicabu reavelli is a species of spider in the family Cyatholipidae. It is the type species of the genus Isicabu and is endemic to KwaZulu-Natal province of South Africa.

== Distribution ==
Isicabu reavelli is known only from Nkandla Forest, where it occurs at approximately 1102 metres above sea level.

== Habitat ==
The species builds small horizontal sheet webs in vegetation in forest areas of the Savanna Biome. The type series was collected by sweeping shrubs in forest areas.

== Conservation ==
The species is known only from the type locality with no known threats, as it occurs in a forest reserve. However, if it occurs outside protected areas, it may be threatened by deforestation and subsistence agriculture. It is listed as Data Deficient.
