= Ilisoa hawequas =

Hawequa Tree Sheet-Web Spider

Scientific classification
- Kingdom: Animalia
- Phylum: Arthropoda
- Subphylum: Chelicerata
- Class: Arachnida
- Order: Araneae
- Infraorder: Araneomorphae
- Family: Cyatholipidae
- Genus: Ilisoa
- Species: I. hawequas

Binomial name
- Ilisoa hawequas Griswold, 1987

Species of spider

Ilisoa hawequas is a species of spider in the family Cyatholipidae. It is endemic to the Western Cape province of South Africa.

== Distribution ==
Ilisoa hawequas is known only from the type locality at Hawequas, where it occurs at approximately 483 metres above sea level.

== Habitat ==
The species builds small horizontal sheet webs in vegetation. The type specimen was collected by sifting humus, suggesting this species lives in leaf litter.

== Etymology ==
The species is named after Hawequas, its type locality in the Western Cape.

== Conservation ==
The species is known only from a single female and is potentially threatened by habitat loss due to agricultural activities, particularly vineyard expansion. It is listed as Data Deficient due to limited sampling.
