= Ilisoa knysna =

Knysna Tree Sheet-Web Spider

Conservation status
- Vulnerable (SANBI Red List)

Scientific classification
- Kingdom: Animalia
- Phylum: Arthropoda
- Subphylum: Chelicerata
- Class: Arachnida
- Order: Araneae
- Infraorder: Araneomorphae
- Family: Cyatholipidae
- Genus: Ilisoa
- Species: I. knysna

Binomial name
- Ilisoa knysna Griswold, 1987

Species of spider

Ilisoa knysna is a species of spider in the family Cyatholipidae. It is the type species of the genus Ilisoa and is endemic to the Western Cape province of South Africa.

== Distribution ==
Ilisoa knysna is known from three locations in the Western Cape: Brenton-on-Sea, Diepwalle Forest Station, and George. The species occurs at elevations between 99 and 466 metres above sea level.

== Habitat ==
The species builds small horizontal sheet webs in vegetation and was collected in wet forest from the Forest Biome.

== Etymology ==
The species is named after the Knysna district, where it was first discovered.

== Conservation ==
The species is threatened by ongoing habitat loss due to infrastructure development around Brenton-on-Sea and Knysna. It is partly protected in Diepwalle Forest Station and is listed as Vulnerable.
