= Ulwembua denticulata =

Conservation status
- Least Concern (SANBI Red List)

Scientific classification
- Kingdom: Animalia
- Phylum: Arthropoda
- Subphylum: Chelicerata
- Class: Arachnida
- Order: Araneae
- Infraorder: Araneomorphae
- Family: Cyatholipidae
- Genus: Ulwembua
- Species: U. denticulata

Binomial name
- Ulwembua denticulata Griswold, 1987

Species of spider

Ulwembua denticulata is a species of spider in the family Cyatholipidae. It is endemic to South Africa and has the widest distribution of any species in the family, occurring across four provinces.

== Distribution ==
Ulwembua denticulata is known from the Eastern Cape, KwaZulu-Natal, Limpopo, Mpumalanga, and Western Cape provinces. It has been recorded from numerous protected areas and occurs at elevations between 107 and 1661 metres above sea level.

== Habitat ==
The species is abundant in wet, closed-canopy forests, where it hangs from sheet webs less than 50 centimetres from the ground on low vegetation and in tree buttresses. It occurs across multiple biomes including Fynbos, Grassland, Indian Ocean Coastal Belt, Forest, and Savanna, and has also been found in avocado and citrus orchards.

== Etymology ==
The species epithet denticulata is Latin meaning "having small teeth", likely referring to morphological features.

== Conservation ==
Although threatened by habitat loss in parts of its range, the species has a very wide geographical range and can survive in agricultural landscapes. It is protected in multiple areas and is listed as being of Least Concern.
