= Ulwembua pulchra =

Dlinza Tree Sheet-Web Spider

Conservation status
- Least Concern (SANBI Red List)

Scientific classification
- Kingdom: Animalia
- Phylum: Arthropoda
- Subphylum: Chelicerata
- Class: Arachnida
- Order: Araneae
- Infraorder: Araneomorphae
- Family: Cyatholipidae
- Genus: Ulwembua
- Species: U. pulchra

Binomial name
- Ulwembua pulchra Griswold, 1987

Species of spider

Ulwembua pulchra is a species of spider in the family Cyatholipidae. It is the type species of the genus Ulwembua and is endemic to South Africa, found in KwaZulu-Natal and the Eastern Cape provinces.

== Distribution ==
Ulwembua pulchra is known from three locations: Dlinza Forest near Eshowe and Tembe Elephant Park in KwaZulu-Natal, and Addo Elephant National Park in the Eastern Cape. The species occurs at elevations between 93 and 587 metres above sea level.

== Habitat ==
The species builds small horizontal sheet webs in vegetation and has been sampled from Forest and Savanna biomes.

== Etymology ==
The species epithet pulchra is Latin meaning "beautiful".

== Conservation ==
The species is protected in three protected areas and has a relatively wide geographic range. It is listed as being of Least Concern.
