= Tekella absidata =

Conservation status
- Not Threatened (NZ TCS)

Scientific classification
- Domain: Eukaryota
- Kingdom: Animalia
- Phylum: Arthropoda
- Subphylum: Chelicerata
- Class: Arachnida
- Order: Araneae
- Infraorder: Araneomorphae
- Family: Cyatholipidae
- Genus: Tekella
- Species: T. absidata

Binomial name
- Tekella absidata Urquhart, 1894

Species of spider

Tekella absidata is a species of Cyatholipidae spider endemic to New Zealand.

== Taxonomy ==
This species was described in 1894 by Arthur Urquhart from female specimens. In 1988, it was revised and the male was described. It was most recently revised in 2001. The holotype is stored in Canterbury Museum.

== Description ==
The male is recorded at 2.29mm in length whereas the female is 1.76mm. This species has a dark brown carapace. The abdomen has pale markings dorsally.

== Distribution ==
This species is known from Stewart Island and the South Island of New Zealand.

== Conservation status ==
Under the New Zealand Threat Classification System, this species is listed as "Not Threatened".
