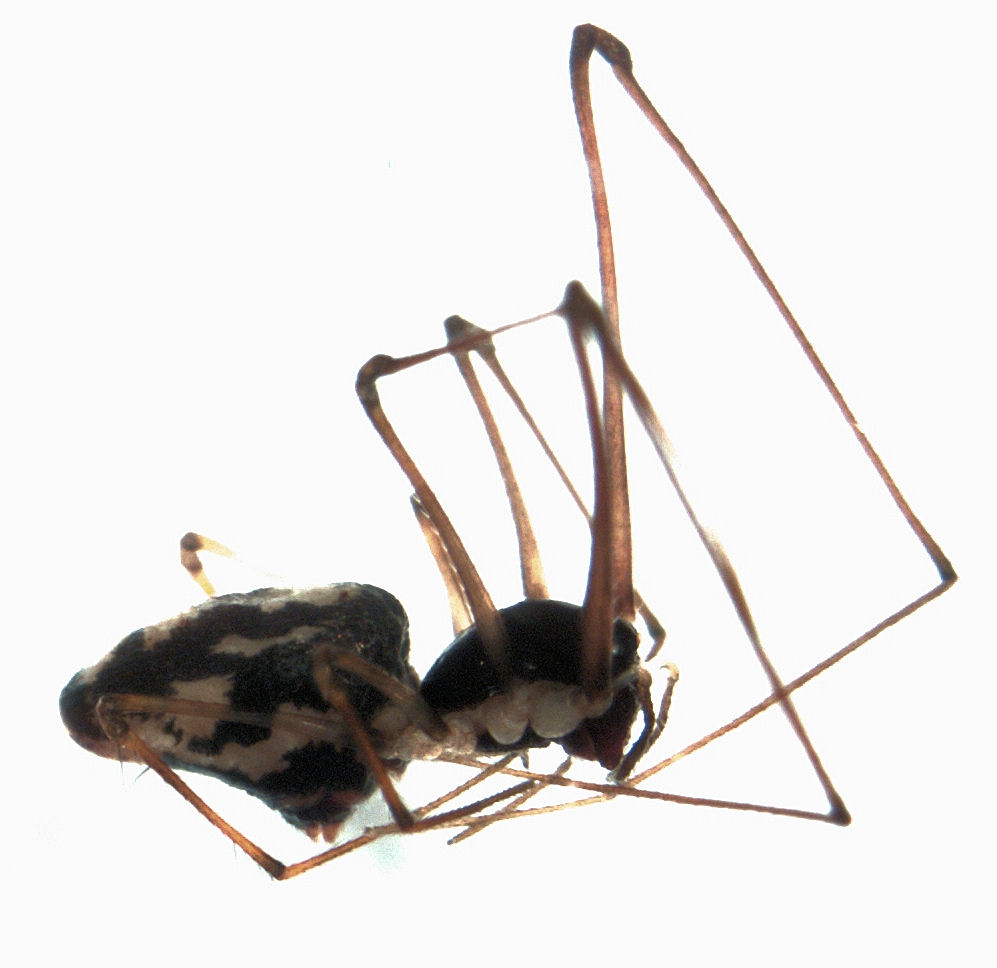
- Adult female

Conservation status
- Not Threatened (NZ TCS)

Scientific classification
- Kingdom: Animalia
- Phylum: Arthropoda
- Subphylum: Chelicerata
- Class: Arachnida
- Order: Araneae
- Infraorder: Araneomorphae
- Family: Cyatholipidae
- Genus: Tekelloides
- Species: T. flavonotatus

Binomial name
- Tekelloides flavonotatus (Urquhart, 1891)

Synonyms
- Ariamnes flavo-notatus

= Tekelloides flavonotatus =

Species of spider

Tekelloides flavonotatus is a species of Cyatholipidae spider endemic to New Zealand.

== Taxonomy ==
This species was described as Ariamnes flavo-notatus in 1891 by Arthur Urquhart from male and female specimens. In 1988 it was moved to the Tekelloides genus.

== Description ==
The male is recorded at 2.14mm in length whereas the female is 2.12mm.

== Distribution ==
This species is widespread in the North Island of New Zealand.

== Conservation status ==
Under the New Zealand Threat Classification System, this species is listed as "Not Threatened".
