= Cyatholipus quadrimaculatus =

Spotted Tree Sheet-Web Spider

Scientific classification
- Kingdom: Animalia
- Phylum: Arthropoda
- Subphylum: Chelicerata
- Class: Arachnida
- Order: Araneae
- Infraorder: Araneomorphae
- Family: Cyatholipidae
- Genus: Cyatholipus
- Species: C. quadrimaculatus

Binomial name
- Cyatholipus quadrimaculatus Simon, 1894

Synonyms
- Moero quadrimaculata O. Pickard-Cambridge, 1904 (preoccupied)

Species of spider

Cyatholipus quadrimaculatus is a species of spider in the family Cyatholipidae. It is endemic to South Africa and is found in the Western Cape and Eastern Cape provinces.

== Distribution ==
Cyatholipus quadrimaculatus has a widespread distribution in the Western and Eastern Cape provinces. It has been recorded from numerous locations including Cape Town, Table Mountain National Park, De Hoop Nature Reserve, Stellenbosch wine estates, and several sites along the Eastern Cape coast. The species occurs from sea level up to 1064 metres elevation.

== Habitat ==
The species builds small horizontal sheet webs 30 centimetres to 2 metres above the ground between tree buttresses, in grass, or in the foliage of low shrubs and trees. It has been sampled from the Fynbos, Indian Ocean Coastal Belt, and Thicket biomes, and also occurs in vineyards around Stellenbosch.

== Etymology ==
The species epithet quadrimaculatus is Latin meaning "four-spotted", referring to the dorsal markings on the opisthosoma.

== Conservation ==
Although threatened by habitat loss in parts of its range, the species appears adaptable and has been found in vineyards. Due to its wide geographical range, it is listed as being of Least Concern.
