= Goloboffia vellardi =

Scientific classification
- Kingdom: Animalia
- Phylum: Arthropoda
- Subphylum: Chelicerata
- Class: Arachnida
- Order: Araneae
- Infraorder: Mygalomorphae
- Family: Migidae
- Genus: Goloboffia
- Species: G. vellardi

Binomial name
- Goloboffia vellardi (Zapfe, 1961)

Synonyms
- Migas vellardi Zapfe, 1961

Species of spider

Goloboffia vellardi is a species of spider in the family Migidae, found in Chile. Initially described by Zapfe in 1961 in the genus Migas, Griswold and Ledford moved it to their new genus Goloboffia in 2001, where it was initially the only species. In 2019, more species were described.
