= Cyatholipus hirsutissimus =

Matjiesfontein Tree Sheet-Web Spider

Conservation status
- Least Concern (SANBI Red List)

Scientific classification
- Kingdom: Animalia
- Phylum: Arthropoda
- Subphylum: Chelicerata
- Class: Arachnida
- Order: Araneae
- Infraorder: Araneomorphae
- Family: Cyatholipidae
- Genus: Cyatholipus
- Species: C. hirsutissimus

Binomial name
- Cyatholipus hirsutissimus Simon, 1894

Species of spider

Cyatholipus hirsutissimus is a species of spider in the family Cyatholipidae. It is the type species of the genus Cyatholipus and is endemic to South Africa.

== Distribution ==
Cyatholipus hirsutissimus is known from the Western Cape and Free State provinces. The species occurs at elevations between 903 and 1385 metres above sea level. It has been recorded from Matjiesfontein, Swartberg Nature Reserve, and the Free State National Botanical Gardens.

== Habitat ==
The species inhabits woodlands along hillsides and is commonly found in leaf litter. It has been sampled from the Grassland, Nama Karoo, and Fynbos biomes. Like other members of its genus, it builds small horizontal sheet webs in vegetation.

== Etymology ==
The species epithet hirsutissimus is Latin meaning "very hairy", referring to the spider's hairy body.

== Conservation ==
The species is protected in two protected areas and has a wide distribution with no known threats. It is considered to be of Least Concern.
