= Ubacisi =

Table Mountain Tree Sheet-Web Spider

Conservation status
- Least Concern (SANBI Red List)

Scientific classification
- Kingdom: Animalia
- Phylum: Arthropoda
- Subphylum: Chelicerata
- Class: Arachnida
- Order: Araneae
- Infraorder: Araneomorphae
- Family: Cyatholipidae
- Genus: Ubacisi
- Species: U. capensis

Binomial name
- Ubacisi capensis (Griswold, 1987)

Synonyms
- Isicabu capensis Griswold, 1987

Species of spider

Ubacisi capensis is a species of spider in the family Cyatholipidae. It is the type species and only member of the monotypic genus Ubacisi and is endemic to South Africa, found in the Western Cape and Eastern Cape provinces.

== Distribution ==
Ubacisi capensis is known from several locations across two provinces. In the Western Cape, it occurs in Table Mountain National Park, including Fernwood Gulley, Newlands Ravine, Skeleton Gorge, Kirstenbosch National Botanical Garden, and bat caves on Table Mountain. In the Eastern Cape, it has been recorded from Thyspunt and Addo Elephant National Park. The species occurs at elevations between 96 and 1029 metres above sea level.

== Habitat ==
The species has been collected from moist, wooded canyons and at the entrance of bat caves. It occurs in the Fynbos and Thicket biomes and builds sheet webs in shaded forest areas.

== Description ==
Spiders in the genus Ubacisi are small, with body length less than 3 mm. The genus is distinguished by having an opisthosoma that is triangular when viewed laterally. The carapace is oval in dorsal view and evenly curved in profile with the posterior margin truncated. The legs are long with the leg formula 1243. The coxae are surrounded by soft cuticle with sclerotized points that do not meet. The opisthosoma lacks coarse setae and has a distinct pedicel.

== Etymology ==
The species epithet capensis refers to the Cape region of South Africa, where it was first discovered.

== Conservation ==
The species has a wide geographic range and is protected in multiple protected areas including Addo Elephant National Park and Table Mountain National Park. It is listed as being of Least Concern.

== Taxonomy ==
The species was originally described in the genus Isicabu but was transferred to the new genus Ubacisi by Griswold in 2001.
