= Tekella unisetosa =

Conservation status
- Not Threatened (NZ TCS)

Scientific classification
- Kingdom: Animalia
- Phylum: Arthropoda
- Subphylum: Chelicerata
- Class: Arachnida
- Order: Araneae
- Infraorder: Araneomorphae
- Family: Cyatholipidae
- Genus: Tekella
- Species: T. unisetosa

Binomial name
- Tekella unisetosa Forster, 1988

Species of spider

Tekella unisetosa is a species of Cyatholipidae spider endemic to New Zealand.

== Taxonomy ==
This species was described in 1988 by Ray Forster from male and female specimens. The holotype is stored in Otago Museum.

== Description ==
The male is recorded at 2.85mm in length whereas the female is 2.65mm. This species has a reddish brown carapace. The abdomen has a strong black pattern dorsally.

== Distribution ==
This species is only known from Fiordland, New Zealand.

== Conservation status ==
Under the New Zealand Threat Classification System, this species is listed as "Not Threatened".
