= Pokennips =

Scientific classification
- Kingdom: Animalia
- Phylum: Arthropoda
- Subphylum: Chelicerata
- Class: Arachnida
- Order: Araneae
- Infraorder: Araneomorphae
- Family: Cyatholipidae
- Genus: Pokennips; Griswold, 2001
- Species: P. dentipes

Binomial name
- Pokennips dentipes (Simon, 1894)

Synonyms
- Cyatholipus dentipes Simon, 1894

Species of spider

Pokennips dentipes is a species of spider in the family Cyatholipidae. It is the type species of the monotypic genus Pokennips and is endemic to the Western Cape province of South Africa.

== Distribution ==
Pokennips dentipes is known only from Buffels Bay on the Cape Peninsula, where it occurs at approximately 2 m above sea level.

== Habitat ==
The species builds small horizontal sheet webs in vegetation on densely vegetated sand dunes in the Fynbos Biome.

== Description ==
Spiders in the genus Pokennips are small, with body length less than 3 mm. The genus is distinguished by having an opisthosoma that is nearly round when viewed laterally and bears coarse setae. The promargin of the cheliceral furrow has three teeth. In males, leg I is modified and thicker than leg II, with the femur curved and the metatarsus bearing ventral spurs.

== Etymology ==
The species epithet dentipes is Latin meaning "toothed foot", referring to the modified male leg I which bears spurs.

== Conservation ==
The species is known only from the type locality and was last collected prior to 1894. It is protected within Table Mountain National Park and is listed as Data Deficient due to the lack of recent collections.

== Taxonomy ==
The species was originally described in the genus Cyatholipus but was transferred to the new genus Pokennips by Griswold in 2001.
