= Tekella nemoralis =

Conservation status
- Not Threatened (NZ TCS)

Scientific classification
- Domain: Eukaryota
- Kingdom: Animalia
- Phylum: Arthropoda
- Subphylum: Chelicerata
- Class: Arachnida
- Order: Araneae
- Infraorder: Araneomorphae
- Family: Cyatholipidae
- Genus: Tekella
- Species: T. nemoralis

Binomial name
- Tekella nemoralis (Urquhart, 1889)

Synonyms
- Linyphia nemoralis

Species of spider

Tekella nemoralis is a species of Cyatholipidae spider endemic to New Zealand.

== Taxonomy ==
This species was described as Linyphia nemoralis in 1889 from male and female specimens. In 1933, it was moved to the Tekella genus, of which it is the type species. It was most recently revised in 1988. The holotype is stored in Canterbury Museum.

== Description ==
The male is recorded at 1.98mm in length whereas the female is 1.86mm.

== Distribution ==
This species is widespread throughout New Zealand.

== Conservation status ==
Under the New Zealand Threat Classification System, this species is listed as "Not Threatened".
