= Goloboffia =

Scientific classification
- Kingdom: Animalia
- Phylum: Arthropoda
- Subphylum: Chelicerata
- Class: Arachnida
- Order: Araneae
- Infraorder: Mygalomorphae
- Family: Migidae
- Genus: Goloboffia; Griswold & Ledford, 2001

Species
- See text.

Genus of spiders

Goloboffia is a genus of spiders in the family Migidae. It was first described in 2001 by Griswold and Ledford to accommodate the single species Goloboffia vellardi, found in Chile. In 2019, more species were described. As of September 2020, five species were accepted:

- Goloboffia biberi Ferretti, Ríos-Tamayo & Goloboff, 2019 – Chile
- Goloboffia griswoldi Ferretti, Ríos-Tamayo & Goloboff, 2019 – Chile
- Goloboffia megadeth Ferretti, Ríos-Tamayo & Goloboff, 2019 – Chile
- Goloboffia pachelbeli Ferretti, Ríos-Tamayo & Goloboff, 2019 – Chile
- Goloboffia vellardi (Zapfe, 1961) (type species) – Chile

The genus is named in honor of Pablo A. Goloboff.
