= Kubwa singularis =

Scientific classification
- Kingdom: Animalia
- Phylum: Arthropoda
- Subphylum: Chelicerata
- Class: Arachnida
- Order: Araneae
- Infraorder: Araneomorphae
- Family: Cyatholipidae
- Genus: Kubwa; Griswold, 2001
- Species: K. singularis

Binomial name
- Kubwa singularis Griswold, 2001

Genus of spiders

Kubwa is a monotypic genus of East African araneomorph spiders in the family Cyatholipidae containing the single species, Kubwa singularis. It was first described by C. E. Griswold in 2001, and has only been found in Tanzania.
