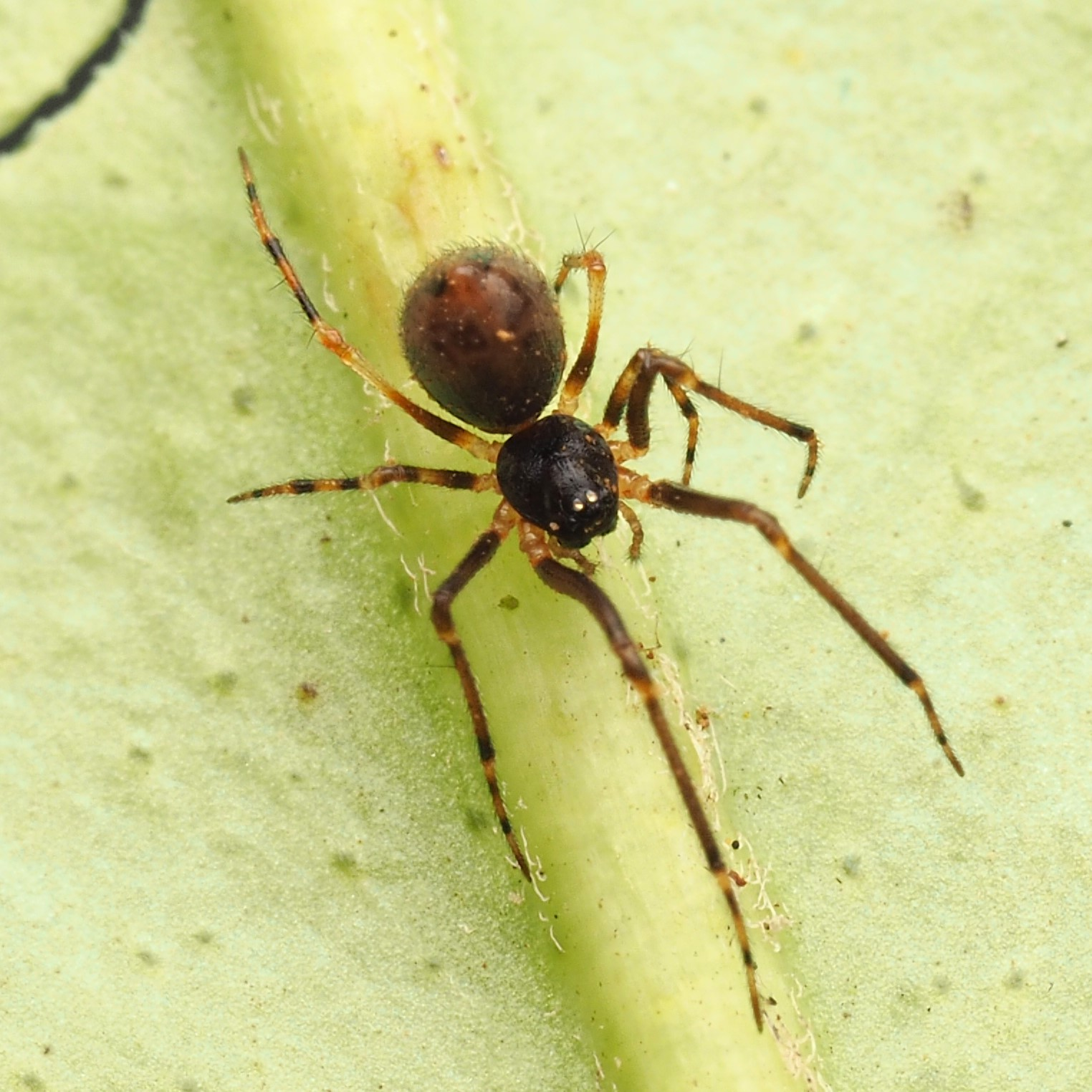

Scientific classification
- Domain: Eukaryota
- Kingdom: Animalia
- Phylum: Arthropoda
- Subphylum: Chelicerata
- Class: Arachnida
- Order: Araneae
- Infraorder: Araneomorphae
- Family: Cyatholipidae
- Genus: Teemenaarus; Davies, 1978
- Species: T. silvestris

Binomial name
- Teemenaarus silvestris Davies, 1978

= Teemenaarus =

Genus of spiders

Teemenaarus is a monotypic genus of Australian araneomorph spiders in the family Cyatholipidae containing the single species, Teemenaarus silvestris. It was first described by V. T. Davies in 1978, and has only been found in Australia.
