= Tekellatus =

Scientific classification
- Kingdom: Animalia
- Phylum: Arthropoda
- Subphylum: Chelicerata
- Class: Arachnida
- Order: Araneae
- Infraorder: Araneomorphae
- Family: Cyatholipidae
- Genus: Tekellatus; Wunderlich, 1978
- Species: T. lamingtoniensis

Binomial name
- Tekellatus lamingtoniensis Wunderlich, 1978

Genus of spiders

Tekellatus is a monotypic genus of Australian araneomorph spiders in the family Cyatholipidae containing the single species, Tekellatus lamingtoniensis. It was first described by J. Wunderlich in 1978, and has only been found in Australia.
