= Forstera daviesae =

Scientific classification
- Kingdom: Animalia
- Phylum: Arthropoda
- Subphylum: Chelicerata
- Class: Arachnida
- Order: Araneae
- Infraorder: Araneomorphae
- Family: Cyatholipidae
- Genus: Forstera; Koçak & Kemal, 2008
- Species: F. daviesae

Binomial name
- Forstera daviesae (Forster, 1988)

Genus of spiders

Forstera is a monotypic genus of Australian araneomorph spiders in the family Cyatholipidae containing the single species, Forstera daviesae. It was first described by A. Ö. Koçak & M. Kemal in 2008, and has only been found in Australia.
