= Alaranea =

Scientific classification
- Kingdom: Animalia
- Phylum: Arthropoda
- Subphylum: Chelicerata
- Class: Arachnida
- Order: Araneae
- Infraorder: Araneomorphae
- Family: Cyatholipidae
- Genus: Alaranea; Griswold, 1997

Type species
- A. merina Griswold, 1997

Species
- 4, see text

Genus of spiders

Alaranea is a genus of East African araneomorph spiders in the family Cyatholipidae, and was first described by C. E. Griswold in 1997.

== Species ==
As of April 2019 it contains four species, all found in Madagascar:

- Alaranea alba Griswold, 1997 – Madagascar
- Alaranea ardua Griswold, 1997 – Madagascar
- Alaranea betsileo Griswold, 1997 – Madagascar
- Alaranea merina Griswold, 1997 (type) – Madagascar
