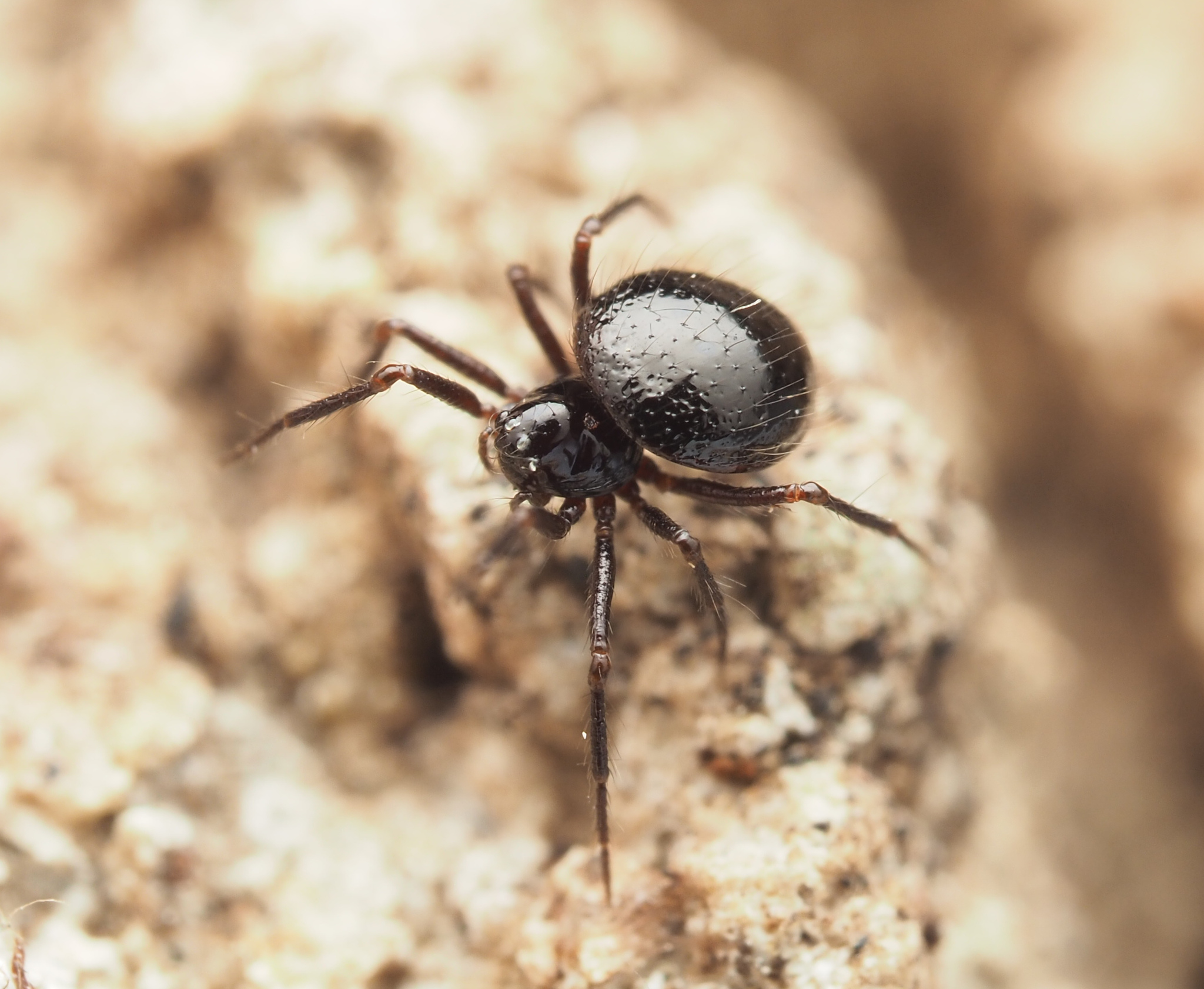

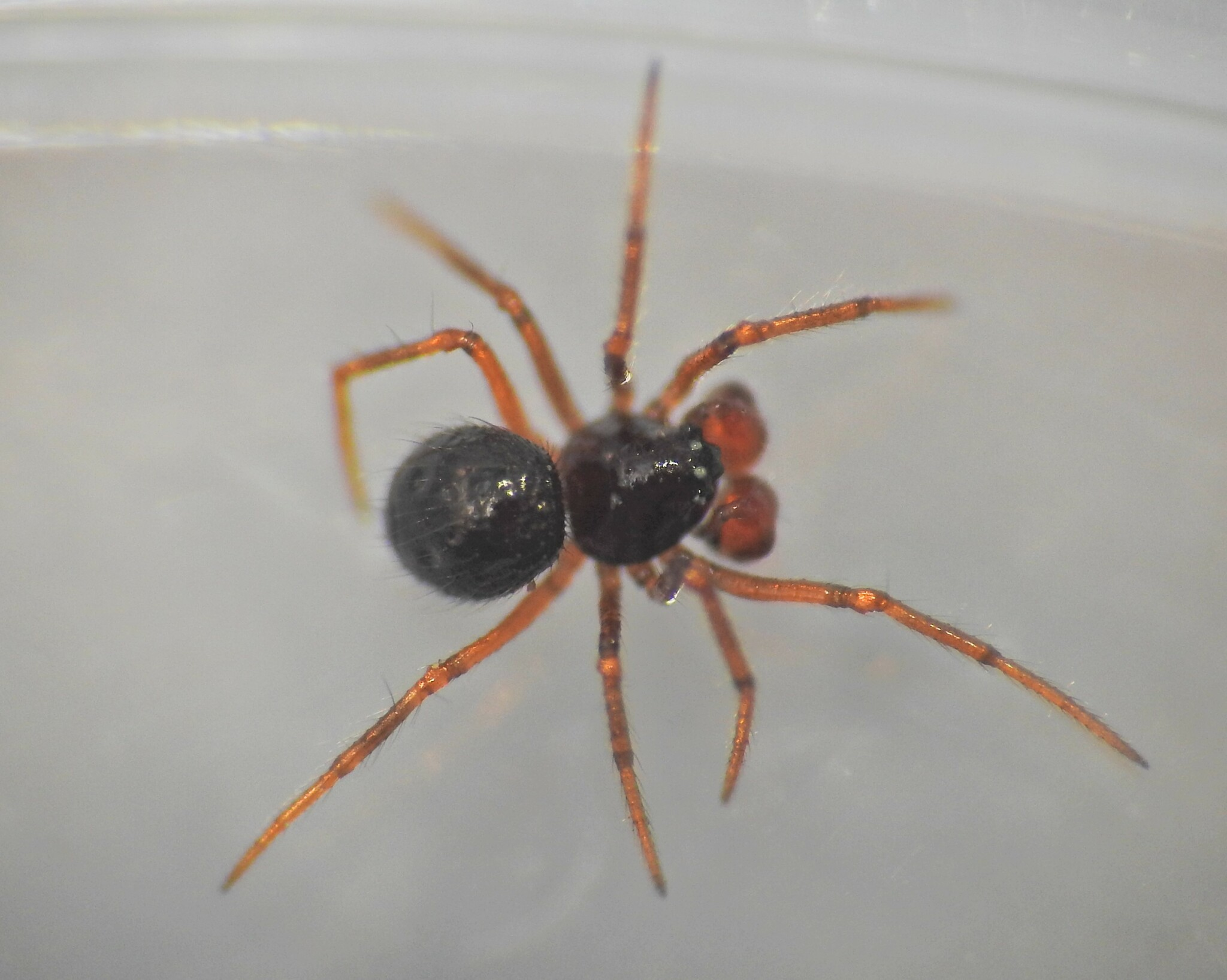

Scientific classification
- Kingdom: Animalia
- Phylum: Arthropoda
- Subphylum: Chelicerata
- Class: Arachnida
- Order: Araneae
- Infraorder: Araneomorphae
- Family: Cyatholipidae
- Genus: Matilda; Forster, 1988
- Species: M. australia

Binomial name
- Matilda australia Forster, 1988

= Matilda australia =

Genus of spiders

Matilda is a monotypic genus of Australian araneomorph spiders in the family Cyatholipidae containing the single species, Matilda australia. It was first described by Raymond Robert Forster in 1988, and has only been found in Australia.
