= Ilisoa =

Scientific classification
- Kingdom: Animalia
- Phylum: Arthropoda
- Subphylum: Chelicerata
- Class: Arachnida
- Order: Araneae
- Infraorder: Araneomorphae
- Family: Cyatholipidae
- Genus: Ilisoa; Griswold, 1987

Type species
- Ilisoa knysna Griswold, 1987

Diversity
- 3 species

Genus of spiders

Ilisoa is a genus of spiders in the family Cyatholipidae. All species are endemic to the Western Cape province of South Africa.

== Description ==
Spiders in the genus Ilisoa are small, with body length less than 3 mm. The carapace is domed with the highest area behind the ocular area. The thoracic fovea forms a deep, longitudinal pit. The posterior median eyes are widely separated from the posterior lateral eyes by a distance greater than twice the diameter of the posterior median eyes. The sternum is wider than long.

The opisthosoma is ovoid and bears dorsal and dorsolateral rows of slender bristles. The legs are slender with femur I approximately equal to carapace length. The leg formula is 1243.

== Ecology and behavior ==
Members of Ilisoa build small horizontal sheet webs in vegetation. They are web dwellers that hang beneath their webs in shaded areas.

== Distribution and habitat ==
All three species are restricted to the Western Cape province of South Africa. They occur in coastal and montane areas, inhabiting the Fynbos Biome. Some species are found on sand dunes and in forest areas.

== Species ==
As of September 2025, three species are recognized:

- Ilisoa conjugalis Griswold, 2001 – South Africa
- Ilisoa hawequas Griswold, 1987 – South Africa
- Ilisoa knysna Griswold, 1987 – South Africa (type species)
