= Pembatatu =

Scientific classification
- Kingdom: Animalia
- Phylum: Arthropoda
- Subphylum: Chelicerata
- Class: Arachnida
- Order: Araneae
- Infraorder: Araneomorphae
- Family: Cyatholipidae
- Genus: Pembatatu; Griswold, 2001

Type species
- P. embamba Griswold, 2001

Species
- P. embamba Griswold, 2001 – Kenya, Tanzania; P. gongo Griswold, 2001 – Kenya; P. mafuta Griswold, 2001 – Kenya

Genus of spiders

Pembatatu is a genus of East African araneomorph spiders in the family Cyatholipidae, and was first described by C. E. Griswold in 2001. As of April 2019 it contains only three species: P. embamba, P. gongo, and P. mafuta.
