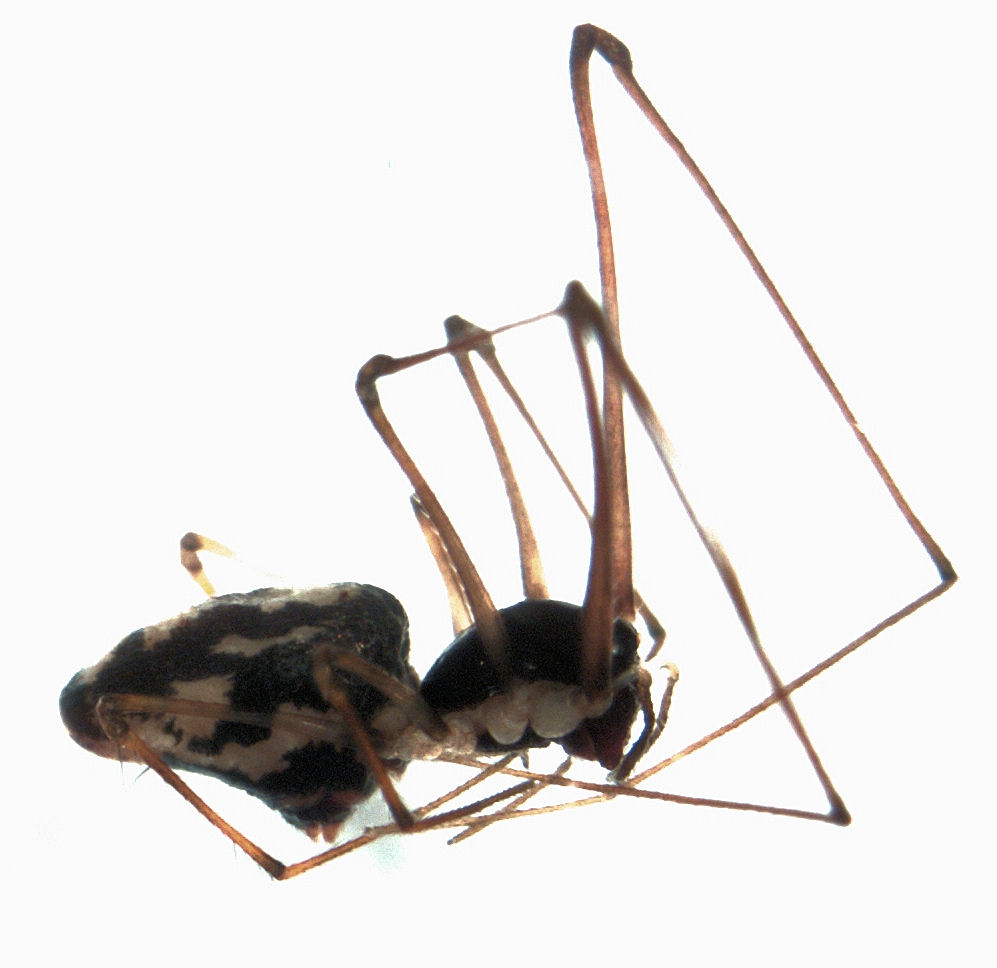
- T. flavonotatus (female)

Scientific classification
- Domain: Eukaryota
- Kingdom: Animalia
- Phylum: Arthropoda
- Subphylum: Chelicerata
- Class: Arachnida
- Order: Araneae
- Infraorder: Araneomorphae
- Family: Cyatholipidae
- Genus: Tekelloides; Forster, 1988

Type species
- T. australis Forster, 1988

Species
- T. australis Forster, 1988 – New Zealand; T. flavonotatus (Urquhart, 1891) – New Zealand

= Tekelloides =

Genus of spiders

Tekelloides is a genus of South Pacific araneomorph spiders in the family Cyatholipidae, and was first described by Raymond Robert Forster in 1988. As of April 2019 it contains only two species, both found in New Zealand: T. australis and T. flavonotatus.
