= Ulwembua =

Scientific classification
- Kingdom: Animalia
- Phylum: Arthropoda
- Subphylum: Chelicerata
- Class: Arachnida
- Order: Araneae
- Infraorder: Araneomorphae
- Family: Cyatholipidae
- Genus: Ulwembua; Griswold, 1987

Type species
- Ulwembua pulchra Griswold, 1987

Diversity
- 7 species

Genus of spiders

Ulwembua is a genus of spiders in the family Cyatholipidae. The genus contains seven species known from Madagascar and South Africa.

== Description ==
Spiders in the genus Ulwembua range from 2.0 to 3.3 mm in body length. The carapace is light with dark markings, oval in dorsal view, and has a finely rugose to granulate texture. In profile, it is evenly curved with the posterior margin truncated to weakly concave.

The opisthosoma is triangular when viewed laterally and lacks coarse setae. It has a distinct pedicel. The legs are long with the leg formula 1243. The coxae are surrounded by soft cuticle with sclerotized points that do not meet.

== Ecology and behavior ==
Members of Ulwembua are abundant in wet, closed-canopy forests where they hang from sheet webs less than 50 cm from the ground in low vegetation and tree buttresses.

== Distribution and habitat ==
In South Africa, the genus occurs across multiple provinces including the Eastern Cape, KwaZulu-Natal, Limpopo, Mpumalanga, and Western Cape. They inhabit various biomes including Fynbos, Grassland, Indian Ocean Coastal Belt, Forest, and Savanna. Some species have been found in agricultural settings such as avocado and citrus orchards.

== Species ==
As of September 2025, seven species are recognized:

- Ulwembua denticulata Griswold, 1987 – South Africa
- Ulwembua outeniqua Griswold, 1987 – South Africa
- Ulwembua pulchra Griswold, 1987 – South Africa (type species)
- Ulwembua andasibe Griswold, 2001 – Madagascar
- Ulwembua cooki Griswold, 2001 – Madagascar
- Ulwembua ranomafana Griswold, 2001 – Madagascar
- Ulwembua tamatave Griswold, 2001 – Madagascar
