= Scharffia =

Scientific classification
- Kingdom: Animalia
- Phylum: Arthropoda
- Subphylum: Chelicerata
- Class: Arachnida
- Order: Araneae
- Infraorder: Araneomorphae
- Family: Cyatholipidae
- Genus: Scharffia; Griswold, 1997

Type species
- S. chinja Griswold, 1997

Species
- 4, see text

Genus of spiders

Scharffia is a genus of East African araneomorph spiders in the family Cyatholipidae, and was first described by C. E. Griswold in 1997.

== Species ==
As of April 2019 it contains four species:

- Scharffia chinja Griswold, 1997 (type) – Tanzania
- Scharffia holmi Griswold, 1997 – Kenya
- Scharffia nyasa Griswold, 1997 – Malawi
- Scharffia rossi Griswold, 1997 – Tanzania
