= Umwani =

Scientific classification
- Kingdom: Animalia
- Phylum: Arthropoda
- Subphylum: Chelicerata
- Class: Arachnida
- Order: Araneae
- Infraorder: Araneomorphae
- Family: Cyatholipidae
- Genus: Umwani; Griswold, 2001

Type species
- U. artigamos Griswold, 2001

Species
- U. anymphos Griswold, 2001 – Malawi; U. artigamos Griswold, 2001 – Tanzania

Genus of spiders

Umwani is a genus of East African araneomorph spiders in the family Cyatholipidae, and was first described by C. E. Griswold in 2001. As of April 2019 it contains only two species: U. anymphos and U. artigamos.
