= Wanzia =

Scientific classification
- Kingdom: Animalia
- Phylum: Arthropoda
- Subphylum: Chelicerata
- Class: Arachnida
- Order: Araneae
- Infraorder: Araneomorphae
- Family: Cyatholipidae
- Genus: Wanzia; Griswold, 1998
- Species: W. fako

Binomial name
- Wanzia fako Griswold, 1998

Genus of spiders

Wanzia is a monotypic genus of Central African araneomorph spiders in the family Cyatholipidae containing the single species, Wanzia fako. It was first described by C. E. Griswold in 1998, and has only been found in Cameroon and in Equatorial Guinea.
