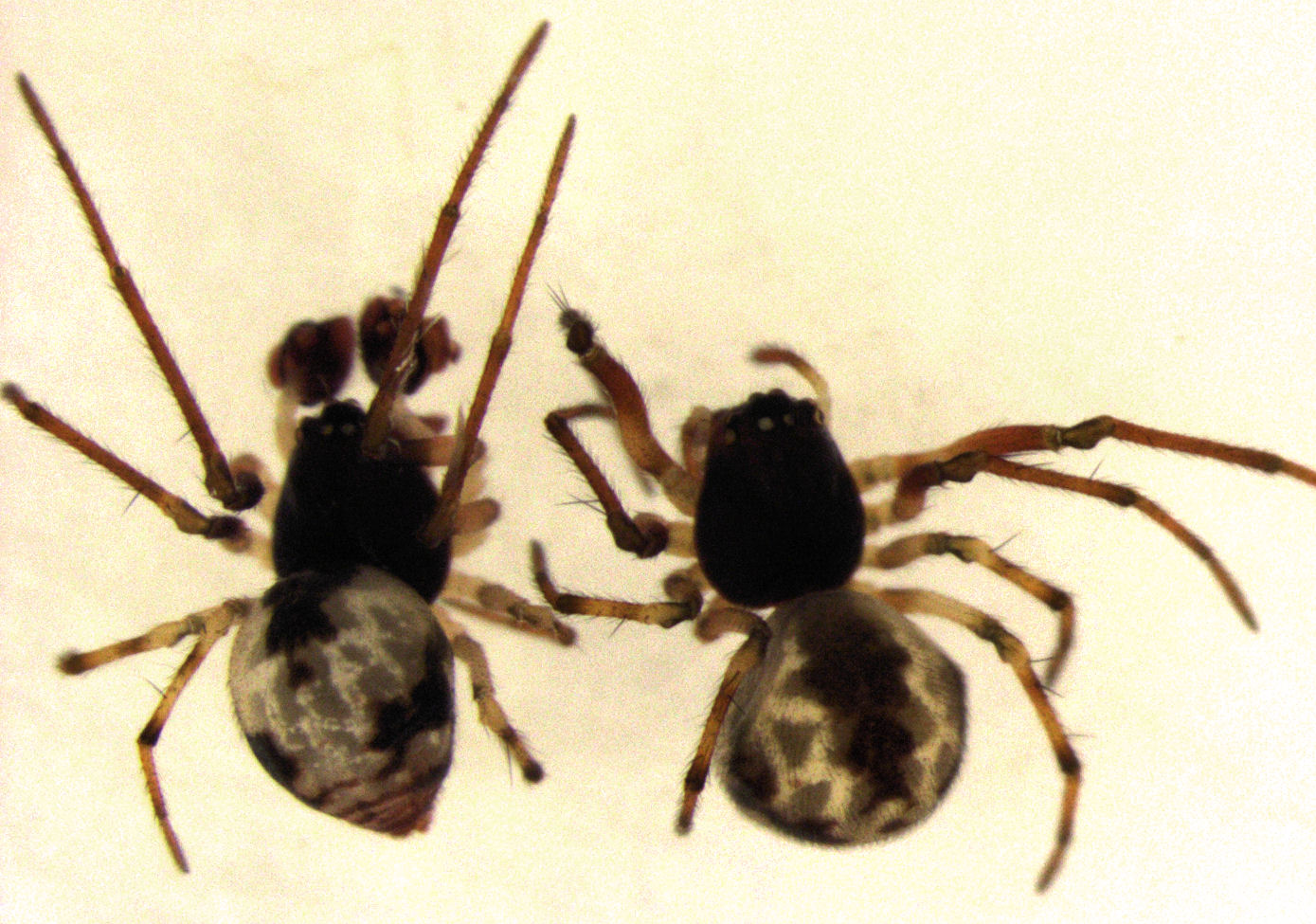
- T. lineata

Scientific classification
- Kingdom: Animalia
- Phylum: Arthropoda
- Subphylum: Chelicerata
- Class: Arachnida
- Order: Araneae
- Infraorder: Araneomorphae
- Family: Cyatholipidae
- Genus: Tekella; Urquhart, 1894

Type species
- T. nemoralis (Urquhart, 1889)

Species
- 5, see text

= Tekella =

Genus of spiders

Tekella is a genus of South Pacific araneomorph spiders in the family Cyatholipidae, and was first described by A. T. Urquhart in 1894.

== Species ==
As of April 2019 it contains five species, all found in New Zealand:

- Tekella absidata Urquhart, 1894 – New Zealand
- Tekella bisetosa Forster, 1988 – New Zealand
- Tekella lineata Forster, 1988 – New Zealand
- Tekella nemoralis (Urquhart, 1889) (type) – New Zealand
- Tekella unisetosa Forster, 1988 – New Zealand
