= Buibui =

Scientific classification
- Kingdom: Animalia
- Phylum: Arthropoda
- Subphylum: Chelicerata
- Class: Arachnida
- Order: Araneae
- Infraorder: Araneomorphae
- Family: Cyatholipidae
- Genus: Buibui; Griswold, 2001

Type species
- B. claviger Griswold, 2001

Species
- 5, see text

Genus of spiders

Not to be confused with the BuiBui from LocoRoco 2 and LocoRoco Midnight Carnival

Buibui is a genus of African araneomorph spiders in the family Cyatholipidae, and was first described by C. E. Griswold in 2001.

== Species ==
As of April 2019 it contains five species:

- Buibui abyssinica Griswold, 2001 – Ethiopia
- Buibui claviger Griswold, 2001 (type) – Kenya
- Buibui cyrtata Griswold, 2001 – Congo
- Buibui kankamelos Griswold, 2001 – Cameroon, Equatorial Guinea (Bioko)
- Buibui orthoskelos Griswold, 2001 – Congo
