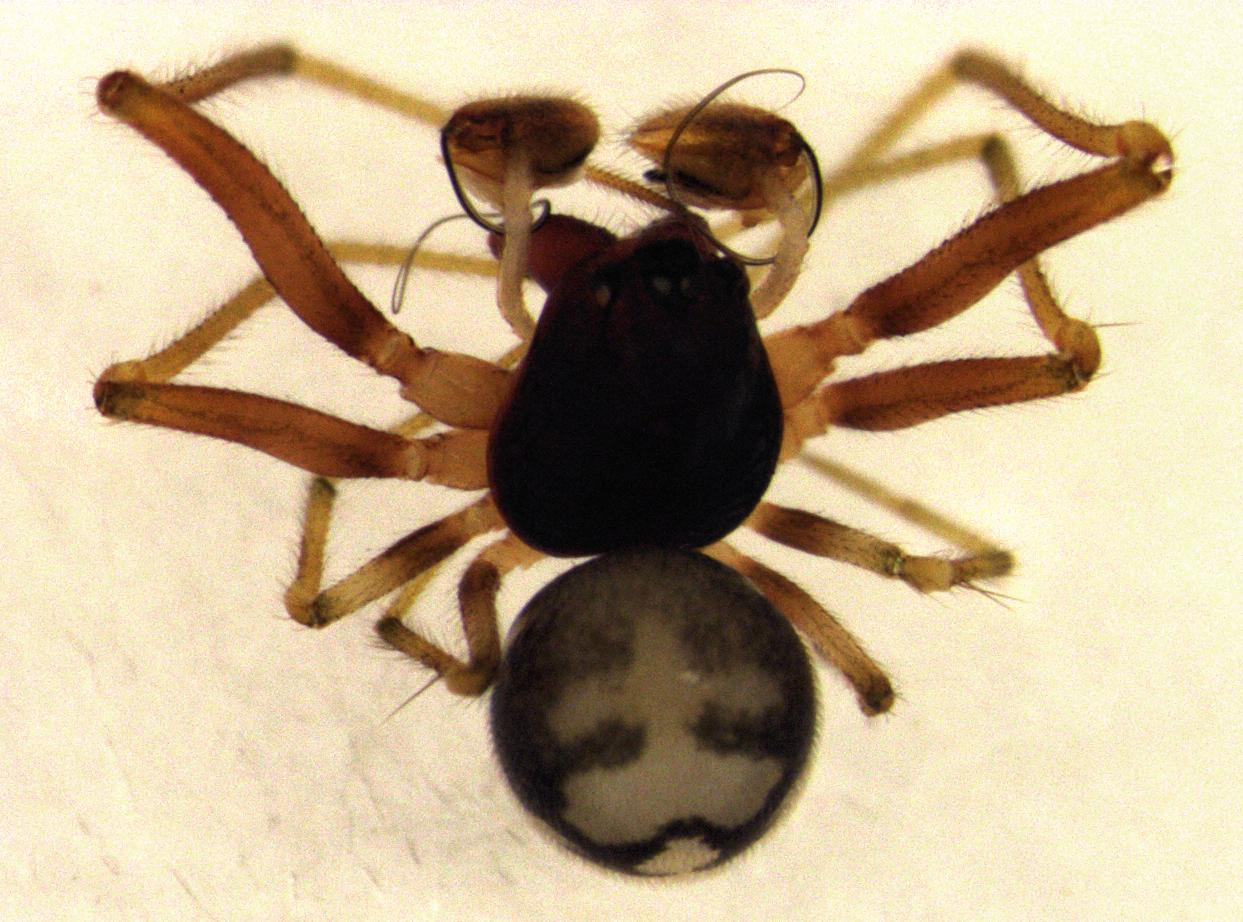
- H. paturau

Conservation status
- Not Threatened (NZ TCS)

Scientific classification
- Kingdom: Animalia
- Phylum: Arthropoda
- Subphylum: Chelicerata
- Class: Arachnida
- Order: Araneae
- Infraorder: Araneomorphae
- Family: Cyatholipidae
- Genus: Hanea; Forster, 1988
- Species: H. paturau

Binomial name
- Hanea paturau Forster, 1988

= Hanea =

Genus of spiders

Hanea is a monotypic genus of Cyatholipidae containing the single species, Hanea paturau.

== Taxonomy ==
This species was described in 1988 by Ray Forster from male specimens. The holotype is stored in the New Zealand Arthropod Collection.

== Description ==
The male is recorded at 1.68mm in length. This species has a dark reddish brown cephalothorax. The abdomen is creamy white with black markings laterally.

== Distribution ==
This species is only known from Nelson, New Zealand.

== Conservation status ==
Under the New Zealand Threat Classification System, this species is listed as "Not Threatened".
