= Uvik =

Scientific classification
- Kingdom: Animalia
- Phylum: Arthropoda
- Subphylum: Chelicerata
- Class: Arachnida
- Order: Araneae
- Infraorder: Araneomorphae
- Family: Cyatholipidae
- Genus: Uvik; Griswold, 2001
- Species: U. vulgaris

Binomial name
- Uvik vulgaris Griswold, 2001

Genus of spiders

Uvik is a monotypic genus of African araneomorph spiders in the family Cyatholipidae containing the single species, Uvik vulgaris. It was first described by C. E. Griswold in 2001, and has only been found in Middle Africa and in Uganda.
