= Vazaha =

Scientific classification
- Kingdom: Animalia
- Phylum: Arthropoda
- Subphylum: Chelicerata
- Class: Arachnida
- Order: Araneae
- Infraorder: Araneomorphae
- Family: Cyatholipidae
- Genus: Vazaha; Griswold, 1997
- Species: V. toamasina

Binomial name
- Vazaha toamasina Griswold, 1997

Genus of spiders

Vazaha is a monotypic genus of East African araneomorph spiders in the family Cyatholipidae containing the single species, Vazaha toamasina. It was first described by C. E. Griswold in 1997, and has only been found in Madagascar.
