= Isicabu =

Scientific classification
- Kingdom: Animalia
- Phylum: Arthropoda
- Subphylum: Chelicerata
- Class: Arachnida
- Order: Araneae
- Infraorder: Araneomorphae
- Family: Cyatholipidae
- Genus: Isicabu; Griswold, 1987

Type species
- Isicabu reavelli Griswold, 1987

Diversity
- 5 species

Genus of spiders

Isicabu is a genus of spiders in the family Cyatholipidae. The genus contains five species, with two endemic to South Africa.

== Description ==
Spiders in the genus Isicabu range from 2.1 to 3.8 millimetres in body length. The carapace is inclined to weakly domed, narrow, and weakly rugose to granulate. The fovea varies from weak to forming a deep ovoid pit. The ocular area is wider than long with the anterior eye row strongly recurved and the posterior eye row nearly straight. The sternum is longer than wide and strongly rugose.

The opisthosoma is triangular and extends posteriorly past the spinnerets. It bears scattered fine setae. The legs are slender to very long.

== Ecology and behavior ==
Members of Isicabu build sheet webs in the understory of forests. Some species have been found in caves.

== Distribution and habitat ==
The South African species occur in KwaZulu-Natal province. They inhabit forest areas within the Savanna, Forest, and Indian Ocean Coastal Belt biomes. Some species have been found in pine plantations.

== Species ==
As of September 2025, five species are recognized:

- Isicabu reavelli Griswold, 1987 – South Africa (type species)
- Isicabu zuluensis Griswold, 1987 – South Africa
- Isicabu griswoldi Saaristo, 2010 – Madagascar
- Isicabu mafate Saaristo, 2010 – Réunion
- Isicabu paluma Griswold, 2001 – Australia
