= Lordhowea nesiota =

Scientific classification
- Kingdom: Animalia
- Phylum: Arthropoda
- Subphylum: Chelicerata
- Class: Arachnida
- Order: Araneae
- Infraorder: Araneomorphae
- Family: Cyatholipidae
- Genus: Lordhowea; Griswold, 2001
- Species: L. nesiota

Binomial name
- Lordhowea nesiota Griswold, 2001

Genus of spiders

Lordhowea is a monotypic genus of Australian araneomorph spiders in the family Cyatholipidae containing the single species, Lordhowea nesiota. It was first described by C. E. Griswold in 2001, and has only been found in Australia.
