= Cyatholipus =

Scientific classification
- Kingdom: Animalia
- Phylum: Arthropoda
- Subphylum: Chelicerata
- Class: Arachnida
- Order: Araneae
- Infraorder: Araneomorphae
- Family: Cyatholipidae
- Genus: Cyatholipus; Simon, 1894

Type species
- Cyatholipus hirsutissimus Simon, 1894

Diversity
- 6 species

Synonyms
- Moero O. Pickard-Cambridge, 1904

Genus of spiders

Cyatholipus is a genus of spiders in the family Cyatholipidae. All species are endemic to South Africa.

== Description ==
Spiders in the genus Cyatholipus are small, with body length less than 3 millimetres. The carapace is domed, short and smooth to weakly rugose, and glabrous with a median row of long setae between the posterior eye row and the thoracic fovea. The fovea forms a broad, deep pit. The sternum is wider than long.

The opisthosoma is nearly spherical and bears rows of stout bristles on the dorsal and posterolateral surfaces. Strong sclerotizations surround the spinnerets and the area between the epigastric furrow and pedicel. The legs are relatively short compared to other cyatholipid genera.

== Ecology and behavior ==
Members of Cyatholipus build small horizontal sheet webs in vegetation. The webs are typically constructed between tree trunks and surrounding low shrubs, within tree buttresses, in low vegetation, or between boulders. The spiders hang beneath the sheet and are usually solitary, although occasionally a male is found in the same web with a penultimate female.

== Distribution and habitat ==
All six species occur in South Africa, distributed across multiple provinces. They inhabit various biomes including moist montane forests, woodlands, grasslands, fynbos, and karoo vegetation. Some species have been found in agricultural landscapes such as vineyards.

== Taxonomy ==
Originally placed with the ray spiders, it was moved to the Cyatholipidae in 1978.

== Species ==
As of September 2025, six species are recognized, all only found in South Africa:

- Cyatholipus avus Griswold, 1987
- Cyatholipus hirsutissimus Simon, 1894 (type species)
- Cyatholipus icubatus Griswold, 1987
- Cyatholipus isolatus Griswold, 1987
- Cyatholipus quadrimaculatus Simon, 1894
- Cyatholipus tortilis Griswold, 1987
