= Charles E. Griswold =

American arachnologist (born 1945)

Charles Edward Griswold
- Born: 1945 (age 80–81)
- Known for: Phylogeny of spiders
- Scientific career
- Fields: Arachnology
- Author abbrev. (zoology): Griswold

Charles Edward Griswold (born 1945) is an American arachnologist, specializing in the phylogeny of spiders.

Griswold worked at the California Academy of Sciences.

== Taxa described (selection) ==
- Afrilobus australis
- Afrilobus capensis
- Afrilobus jocquei
- Afrilobus
- Alaranea
- Azanialobus lawrencei
- Buibui
- Darkoneta
- Goloboffia
- Ilisoa
- Isicabu
- Kubwa
- Kubwa singularis
- Lordhowea
- Lordhowea nesiota
- Pembatatu
- Pokennips
- Scharffia nyasa
- Scharffia
- Ubacisi
- Ubacisi capensis
- Ulwembua
- Umwani anymphos
- Umwani
- Uvik
- Uvik vulgaris
- Vazaha
- Vazaha toamasina
- Wanzia
- Wanzia fako

Category:Taxa named by Charles E. Griswold

== Selected publications ==
- Griswold, C. E. 1983. A Revision of the Genus Habronattus F. O. P. Cambridge (Araneae, Salticidae), with Phenetic and Cladistic Analyses. Vol. 2. University of California, Berkeley, 1,304 pp.
- ————. 1985a. A revision of the African spiders of the family Microstigmatidae (Araneae: Mygalomorphae). Annals of the Natal Museum 27: 1–37.
- ————. 1985b. Isela okuncana, a new genus and species of kleptoparasitic spider from southern Africa (Araneae: Mysmenidae). Annals of the Natal Museum 27: 207–217.
- Platnick, N. I., Coddington, J. A., Forster, R. R., & Griswold, C. E. 1991. Spinneret Morphology and the Phylogeny of Haplogyne Spiders (Araneae, Araneomorphae). American Museum Novitates 3016: 1–73.
- Griswold, C. E., Coddington, J. A., Platnick, N. I., & Forster, R. R. 1999. Towards a Phylogeny of Entelegyne Spiders (Araneae, Araneomorphae, Entelegynae). Journal of Arachnology 27: 53–63.
