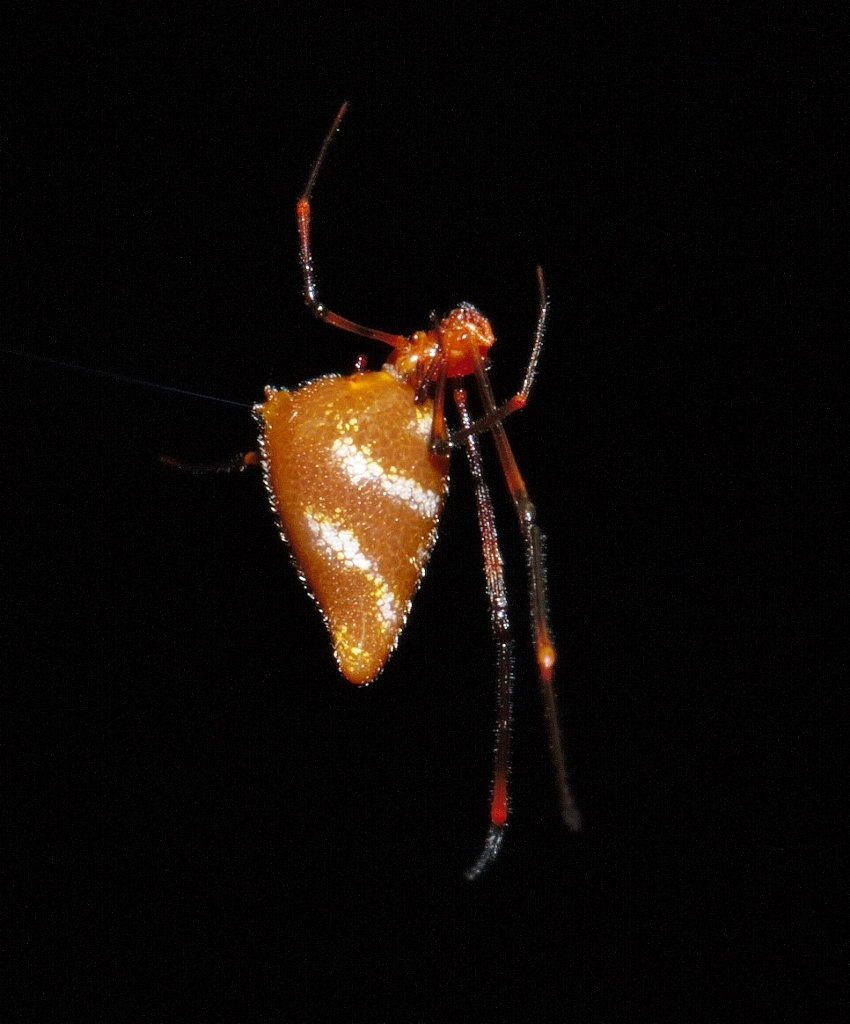
- Isicabu sp.
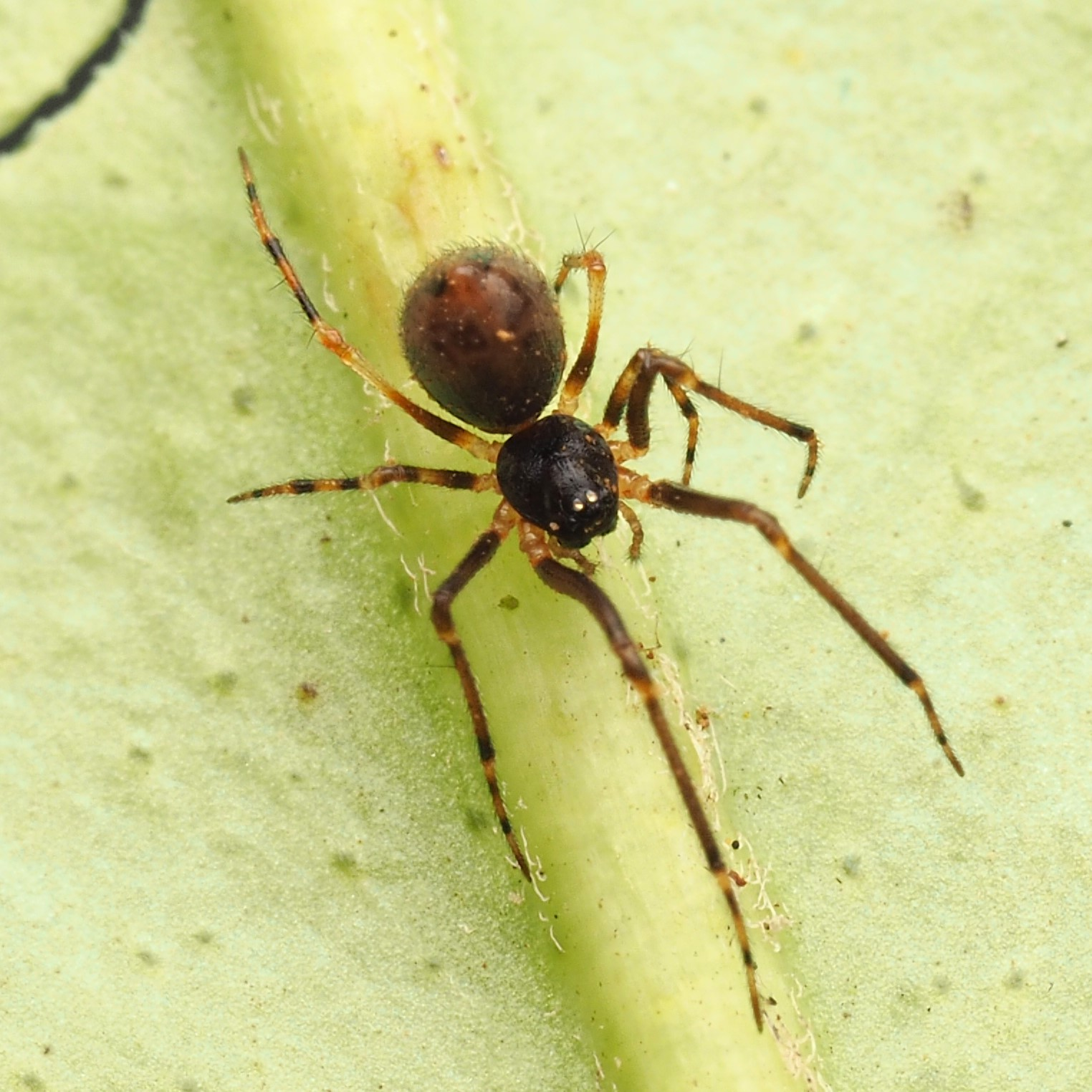
- Teemenaarus sp.

Scientific classification
- Kingdom: Animalia
- Phylum: Arthropoda
- Subphylum: Chelicerata
- Class: Arachnida
- Order: Araneae
- Infraorder: Araneomorphae
- Family: Cyatholipidae; Simon, 1894

Diversity
- 23 genera, 58 species
- blue: reported countries (WSC)

= Cyatholipidae =

Cyatholipidae Temporal range: Palaeogene–present

Family of spiders

Cyatholipidae is a family of spiders first described by Eugène Simon in 1894. Most live in moist montane forest, though several species, including Scharffia rossi, live in dry savannah regions. They occur in Africa, including Madagascar, New Zealand and Australia, and one species (Pokennips dentipes) in Jamaica. Most members of this family hang beneath sheet webs. Fossil species occur in the Eocene aged Bitterfield and Baltic Ambers, suggesting a wider geographic distribution in the past.

== Genera ==
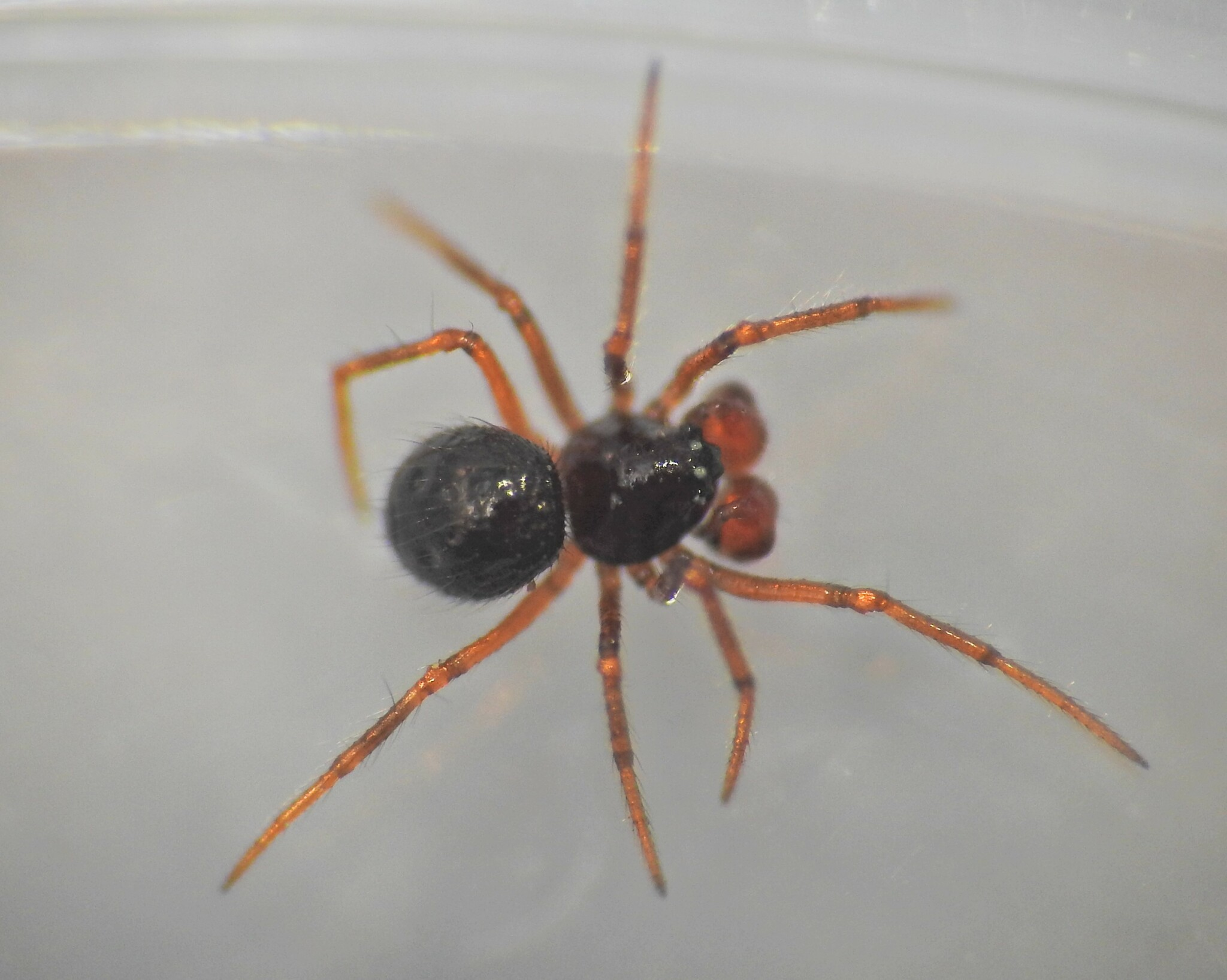
Matilda australia

As of January 2026, this family includes 23 genera and 58 species:

- Alaranea Griswold, 1997 – Madagascar
- Buibui Griswold, 2001 – Cameroon, DR Congo, Equatorial Guinea, Ethiopia, Kenya
- Cyatholipus Simon, 1894 – South Africa
- Forstera Koçak & Kemal, 2008 – Australia
- Hanea Forster, 1988 – New Zealand
- Ilisoa Griswold, 1987 – South Africa
- Isicabu Griswold, 1987 – Tanzania, South Africa
- Kubwa Griswold, 2001 – Tanzania
- Lordhowea Griswold, 2001 – Australia
- Matilda Forster, 1988 – Australia
- Pembatatu Griswold, 2001 – Kenya, Tanzania
- Pokennips Griswold, 2001 – South Africa
- Scharffia Griswold, 1997 – Kenya, Malawi, Tanzania
- Teemenaarus Davies, 1978 – Australia
- Tekella Urquhart, 1894 – New Zealand
- Tekellatus Wunderlich, 1978 – Australia
- Tekelloides Forster, 1988 – New Zealand
- Ubacisi Griswold, 2001 – South Africa
- Ulwembua Griswold, 1987 – Madagascar, Tanzania, South Africa
- Umwani Griswold, 2001 – Malawi, Tanzania
- Uvik Griswold, 2001 – Congo, Uganda
- Vazaha Griswold, 1997 – Madagascar
- Wanzia Griswold, 1998 – Cameroon, Equatorial Guinea

In addition, five fossil genera are known.

- †Balticolipus Wunderlich, 2004 (Bitterfield and Baltic Ambers)
- †Cyathosuccinus Wunderlich, 2004 (Baltic Amber)
- †Erigolipus Wunderlich, 2004 (Baltic Amber)
- †Spinilipus Wunderlich, 1993 (Bitterfield and Baltic Ambers)
- †Succinilipus Wunderlich, 1993 (Bitterfield and Baltic Ambers)
