= Themacrys monticola =

Cathkin Peak Themacrys Hackled Band Spider

Conservation status
- Least Concern (SANBI Red List)

Scientific classification
- Kingdom: Animalia
- Phylum: Arthropoda
- Subphylum: Chelicerata
- Class: Arachnida
- Order: Araneae
- Infraorder: Araneomorphae
- Family: Phyxelididae
- Genus: Themacrys
- Species: T. monticola

Binomial name
- Themacrys monticola (Lawrence, 1939)

Synonyms
- Haemilla monticola Lawrence, 1939

Species of spider

Themacrys monticola is a species of spider in the family Phyxelididae. It is endemic to KwaZulu-Natal, South Africa, and is commonly known as the Cathkin Peak Themacrys hackled band spider.

== Distribution ==
Themacrys monticola is known from several localities in KwaZulu-Natal. The species occurs at altitudes ranging from 527 to 2,785 m above sea level.

== Habitat and ecology ==
This species inhabits the Grassland and Savanna biomes. Themacrys monticola is a ground retreat-web cryptic spider that lives in dark places. This species is the commonest cribellate spider in the cool, wet Podocarpus forests at between 1,000 and 2,000 m in the gorges and canyons of the Drakensberg Mountains of KwaZulu-Natal, where they are found beneath rocks and logs. They also occur in areas of moist montane grassland where there are abundant tree ferns along watercourses. This species also occurs in mid-elevation subtropical forests.

== Conservation ==
Themacrys monticola is listed as Least Concern by the South African National Biodiversity Institute. This montane species has no known threats and is protected in the Royal Natal National Park.

== Etymology ==
The specific name is Latin for "mountain-dwelling".

== Taxonomy ==
The species was originally described by Reginald Frederick Lawrence in 1939 as Haemilla monticola from Cathkin Peak. It was later transferred to the genus Themacrys by Pekka Lehtinen in 1967 and revised by Griswold in 1990. Themacrys monticola is known from both sexes.
