= Themacrys silvicola =

Pietermaritzburg Themacrys Hackled Band Spider

Conservation status
- Vulnerable (SANBI Red List)

Scientific classification
- Kingdom: Animalia
- Phylum: Arthropoda
- Subphylum: Chelicerata
- Class: Arachnida
- Order: Araneae
- Infraorder: Araneomorphae
- Family: Phyxelididae
- Genus: Themacrys
- Species: T. silvicola

Binomial name
- Themacrys silvicola (Lawrence, 1938)

Synonyms
- Haemilla silvicola Lawrence, 1938

Species of spider

Themacrys silvicola is a species of spider in the family Phyxelididae. It is endemic to South Africa and is commonly known as the Pietermaritzburg Themacrys hackled band spider.

== Distribution ==
Themacrys silvicola is distributed across two South African provinces, Eastern Cape and KwaZulu-Natal. The species occurs at altitudes ranging from 4 to 1,551 m above sea level.

== Habitat and ecology ==
This species inhabits the Grassland and Savanna biomes. Themacrys silvicola is a ground retreat-web cryptic spider that lives in damp and dark places.

== Conservation ==
Themacrys silvicola is listed as Vulnerable by the South African National Biodiversity Institute. Although the species is known from two provinces, it is experiencing ongoing loss of habitat due to urban development, crop cultivation and afforestation. There has been extensive transformation of habitat within the KwaZulu-Natal Midlands, with habitat loss due to agroforestry plantations, crop cultivation and urban development.

== Etymology ==
The specific name is Latin for "forest-dwelling".

== Taxonomy ==
The species was originally described by Reginald Frederick Lawrence in 1938 as Haemilla silvicola from Pietermaritzburg in KwaZulu-Natal. It was later transferred to the genus Themacrys by Lehtinen in 1967 and revised by Griswold in 1990. Themacrys silvicola is known from both sexes.
