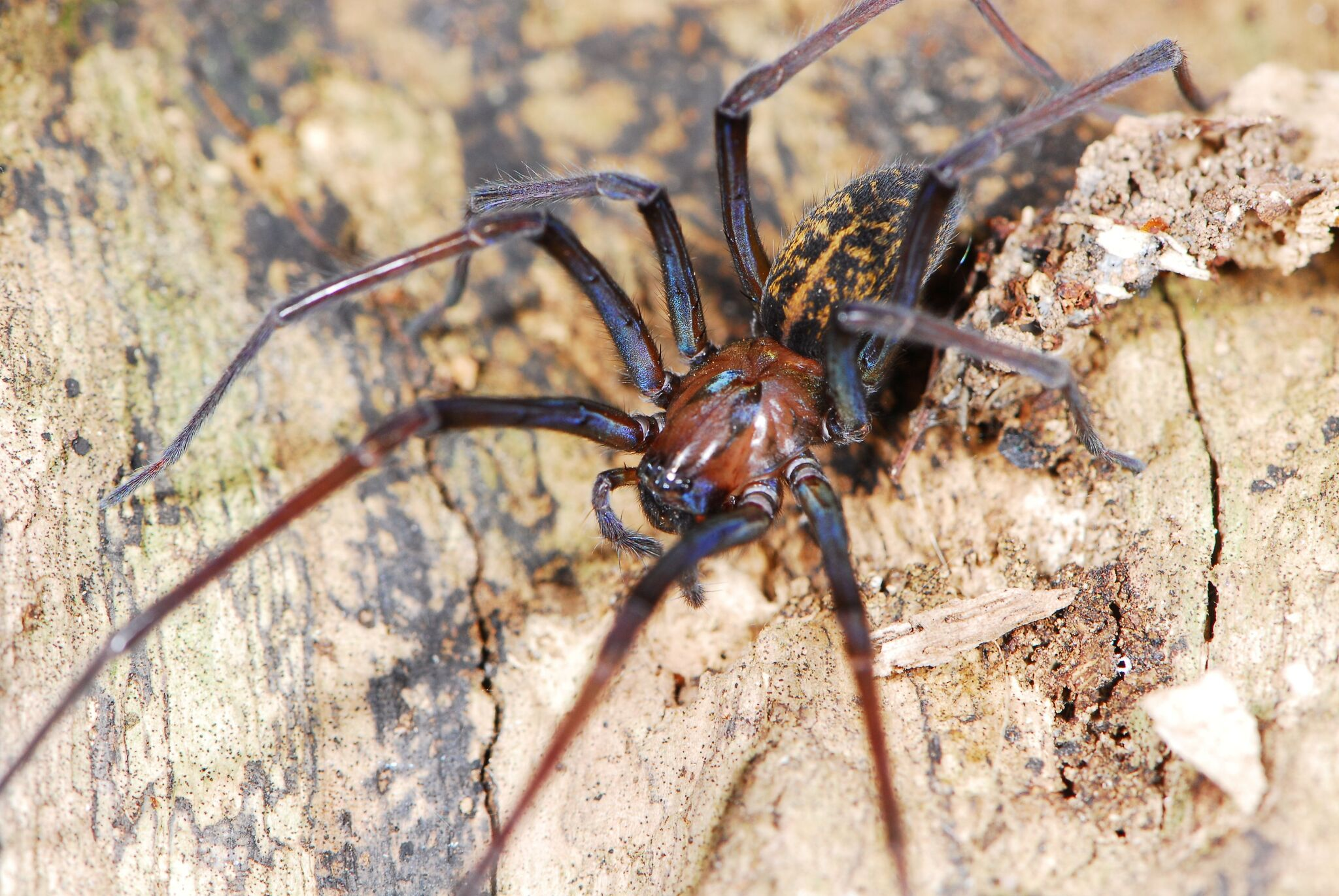
- female T. irrorata
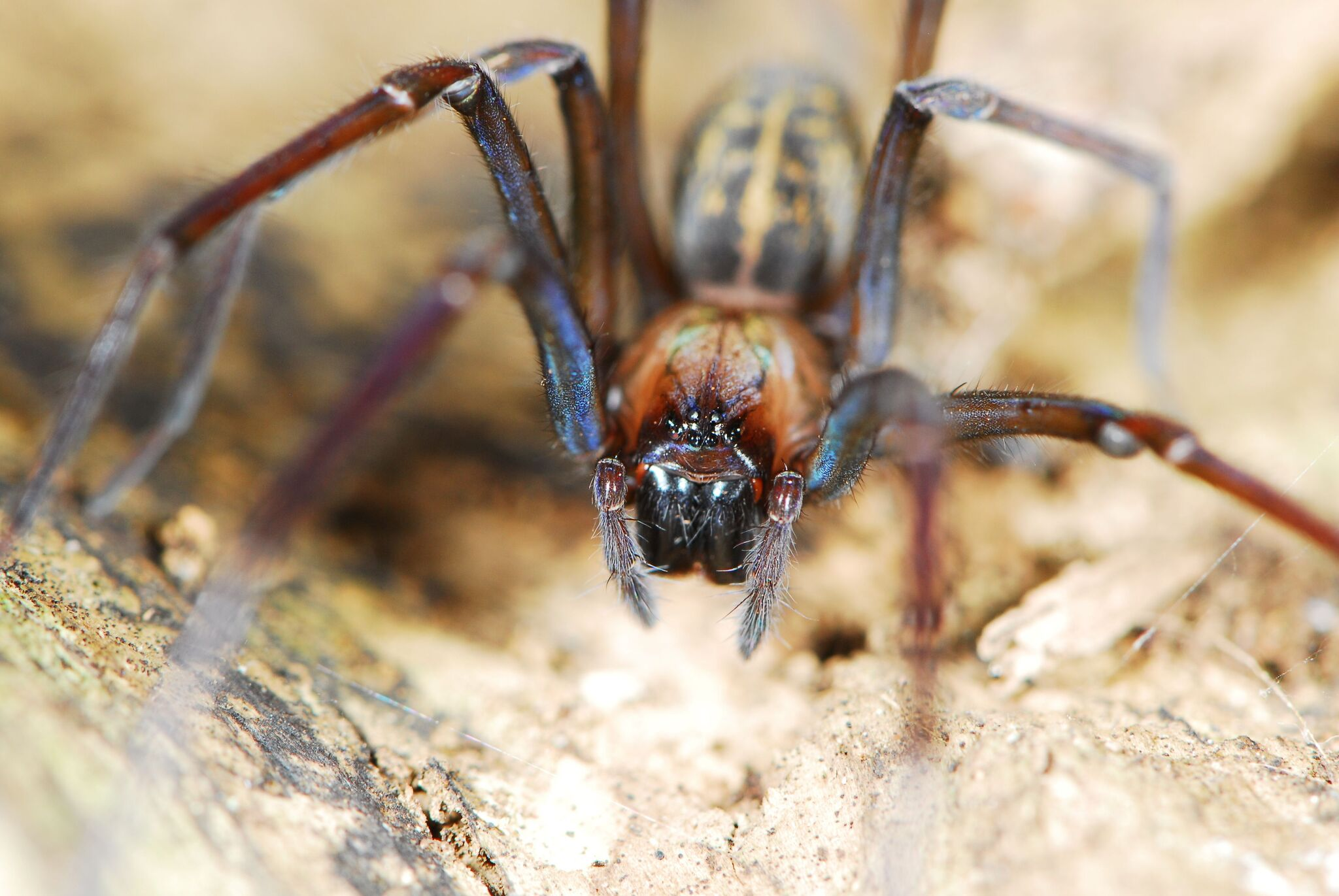
- female T. irrorata

Scientific classification
- Kingdom: Animalia
- Phylum: Arthropoda
- Subphylum: Chelicerata
- Class: Arachnida
- Order: Araneae
- Infraorder: Araneomorphae
- Family: Phyxelididae
- Genus: Themacrys; Simon, 1906

Type species
- T. irrorata Simon, 1906

Species
- 5, see text

= Themacrys =

Genus of spiders

Themacrys is a genus of South African araneomorph spiders in the family Phyxelididae, and was first described by Eugène Louis Simon in 1906.

== Description ==
Themacrys are small to large spiders with total lengths ranging from 4.5 to 16 mm. The body is sparsely setose. The carapace is wider than long, with a thoracic fovea that is long, deep and narrow, or broader and narrowed posteriorly. The eyes are arranged in two rows.

The promargin of the fang furrow has 5 or 6 teeth, while the retromargin has 6-8 heterogeneous teeth. The sternum is long with a base that is weakly to moderately narrowed. The legs are short to elongate with leg formula 1423 or 4123. Apical metatarsal combs are absent, and leg markings are usually uniform. The metatarsus has a clasping spine situated on a retrolateral process and stout denticles. The palpal femur usually has a triangular patch of thorns or linear arrangement.

The abdomen usually displays a dorsal, central longitudinal light band and crossbars, rarely uniform, while the ventral bands are bold and clear.

== Species ==
As of September 2025 it contains five species, found only in South Africa:

- Themacrys cavernicola (Lawrence, 1939) (also found in Lesotho)
- Themacrys irrorata Simon, 1906 (type)
- Themacrys monticola (Lawrence, 1939)
- Themacrys silvicola (Lawrence, 1938)
- Themacrys ukhahlamba Griswold, 1990
