= Themacrys cavernicola =

Zululand Cave Hackled Band Spider

Conservation status
- Least Concern (SANBI Red List)

Scientific classification
- Kingdom: Animalia
- Phylum: Arthropoda
- Subphylum: Chelicerata
- Class: Arachnida
- Order: Araneae
- Infraorder: Araneomorphae
- Family: Phyxelididae
- Genus: Themacrys
- Species: T. cavernicola

Binomial name
- Themacrys cavernicola (Lawrence, 1939)

Synonyms
- Haemilla cavernicola Lawrence, 1939

Species of spider

Themacrys cavernicola is a species of spider in the family Phyxelididae. It occurs in South Africa and Lesotho and is commonly known as the Zululand cave hackled band spider.

== Distribution ==
Themacrys cavernicola is distributed across two South African provinces: KwaZulu-Natal and Mpumalanga, and also occurs in Lesotho. The species occurs at altitudes ranging from 647 to 1,795 m above sea level.

== Habitat and ecology ==
This species inhabits the Grassland and Savanna biomes. Themacrys cavernicola is a ground retreat-web cryptic spider that lives in dark places. The species is sometimes found in caves.

== Conservation ==
Themacrys cavernicola is listed as Least Concern by the South African National Biodiversity Institute. The species has a wide geographic range and there are no significant threats identified.

== Etymology ==
The specific name means "cave-dwelling" in Latin.

== Taxonomy ==
The species was originally described by Reginald Frederick Lawrence in 1939 as Haemilla cavernicola from the Noodsberg Caves in KwaZulu-Natal. It was later transferred to the genus Themacrys by Pekka Lehtinen in 1967 and revised by Griswold in 1990. Themacrys cavernicola is known from both sexes.
