= Themacrys ukhahlamba =

Scientific classification
- Kingdom: Animalia
- Phylum: Arthropoda
- Subphylum: Chelicerata
- Class: Arachnida
- Order: Araneae
- Infraorder: Araneomorphae
- Family: Phyxelididae
- Genus: Themacrys
- Species: T. ukhahlamba

Binomial name
- Themacrys ukhahlamba Griswold, 1990

Species of spider

Themacrys ukhahlamba is a species of spider in the family Phyxelididae. It is endemic to KwaZulu-Natal, South Africa.

== Distribution ==
Themacrys ukhahlamba is known from two localities in KwaZulu-Natal, Little Switzerland and Mont-Aux-Sources (Phofung). The species occurs at altitudes ranging from 1,243 to 2,998 m above sea level.

== Habitat and ecology ==
This species inhabits the Grassland biome. Themacrys ukhahlamba is a ground retreat-web cryptic spider that lives in damp and dark places. The species has been sampled from mountain grassland.

== Conservation ==
Themacrys ukhahlamba is listed as Data Deficient due to lack of data and taxonomic reasons. The status of the species remains obscure, and additional sampling is needed to collect males and determine the species' range. Threats to this species are unknown.

== Taxonomy ==
The species was described by Griswold in 1990 from Mont-Aux-Sources (Phofung). Themacrys ukhahlamba is known from only the female.
