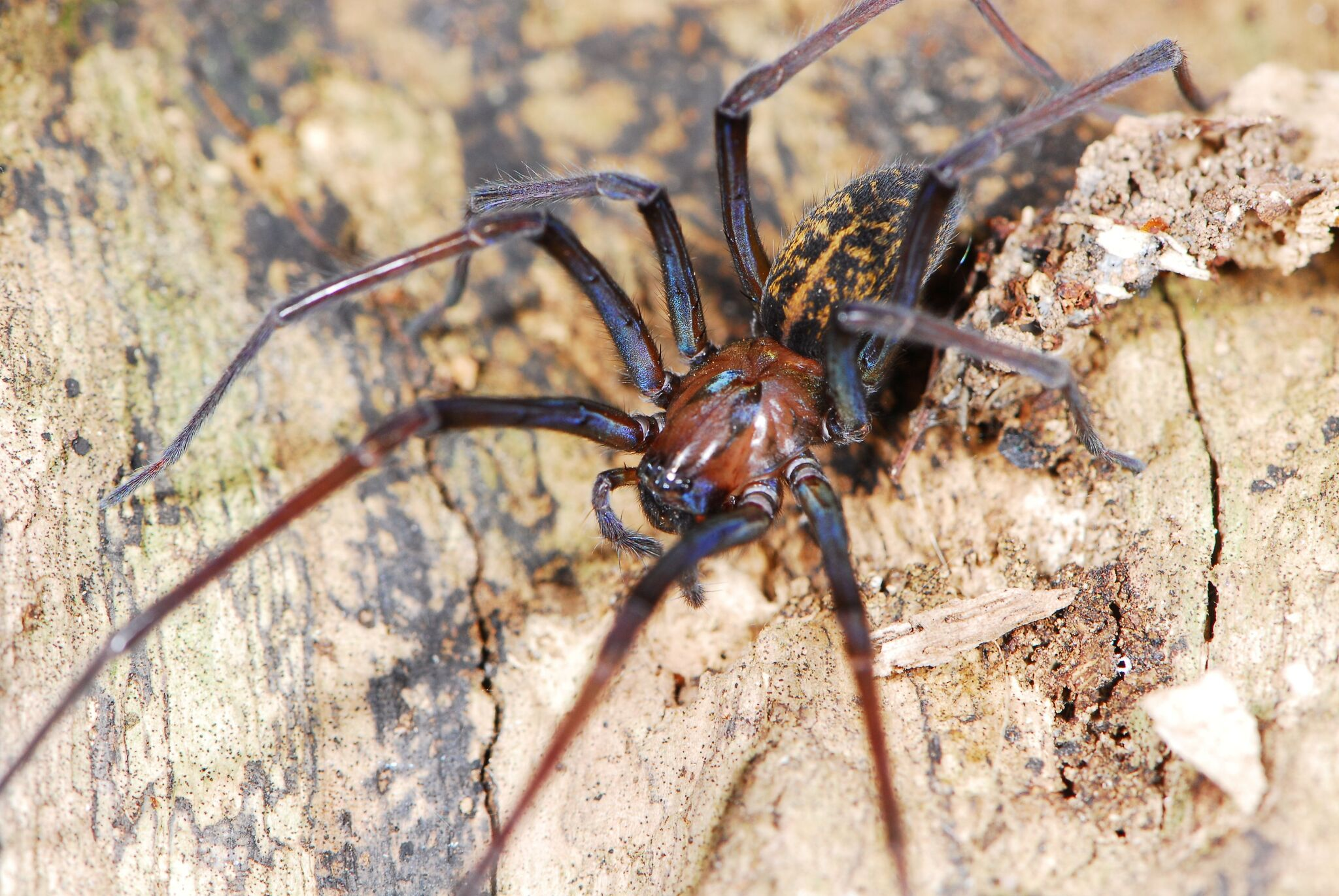
- Female
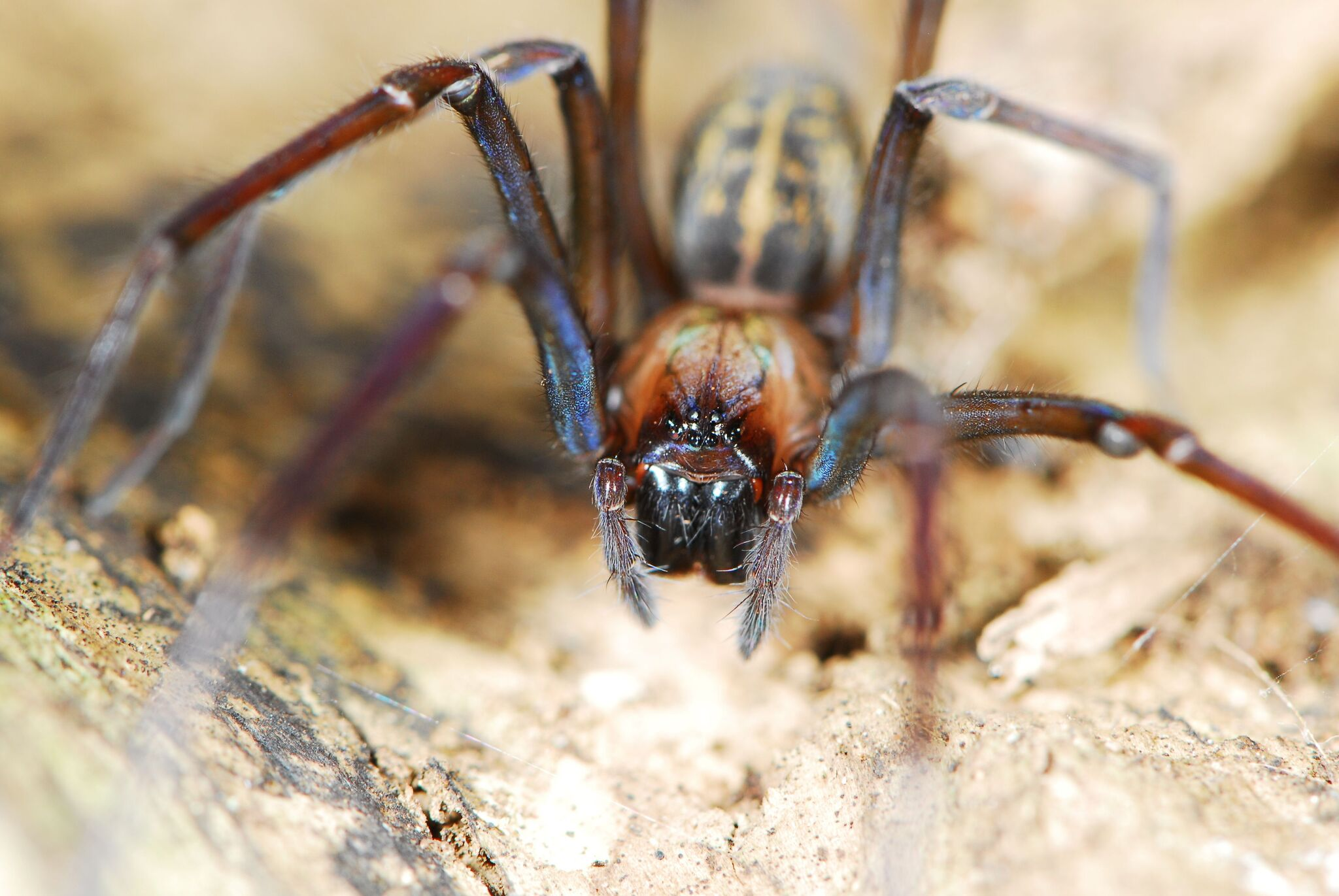
- Female

Scientific classification
- Kingdom: Animalia
- Phylum: Arthropoda
- Subphylum: Chelicerata
- Class: Arachnida
- Order: Araneae
- Infraorder: Araneomorphae
- Family: Phyxelididae
- Genus: Themacrys
- Species: T. irrorata

Binomial name
- Themacrys irrorata Simon, 1906

Synonyms
- Haemilla australis Lawrence, 1937

= Themacrys irrorata =

Hluluwe Themacrys Hackled Band Spider

Species of spider

Themacrys irrorata is a species of spider in the family Phyxelididae. It is endemic to South Africa and is commonly known as the Hluluwe Themacrys hackled band spider. The species serves as the type species for its genus.

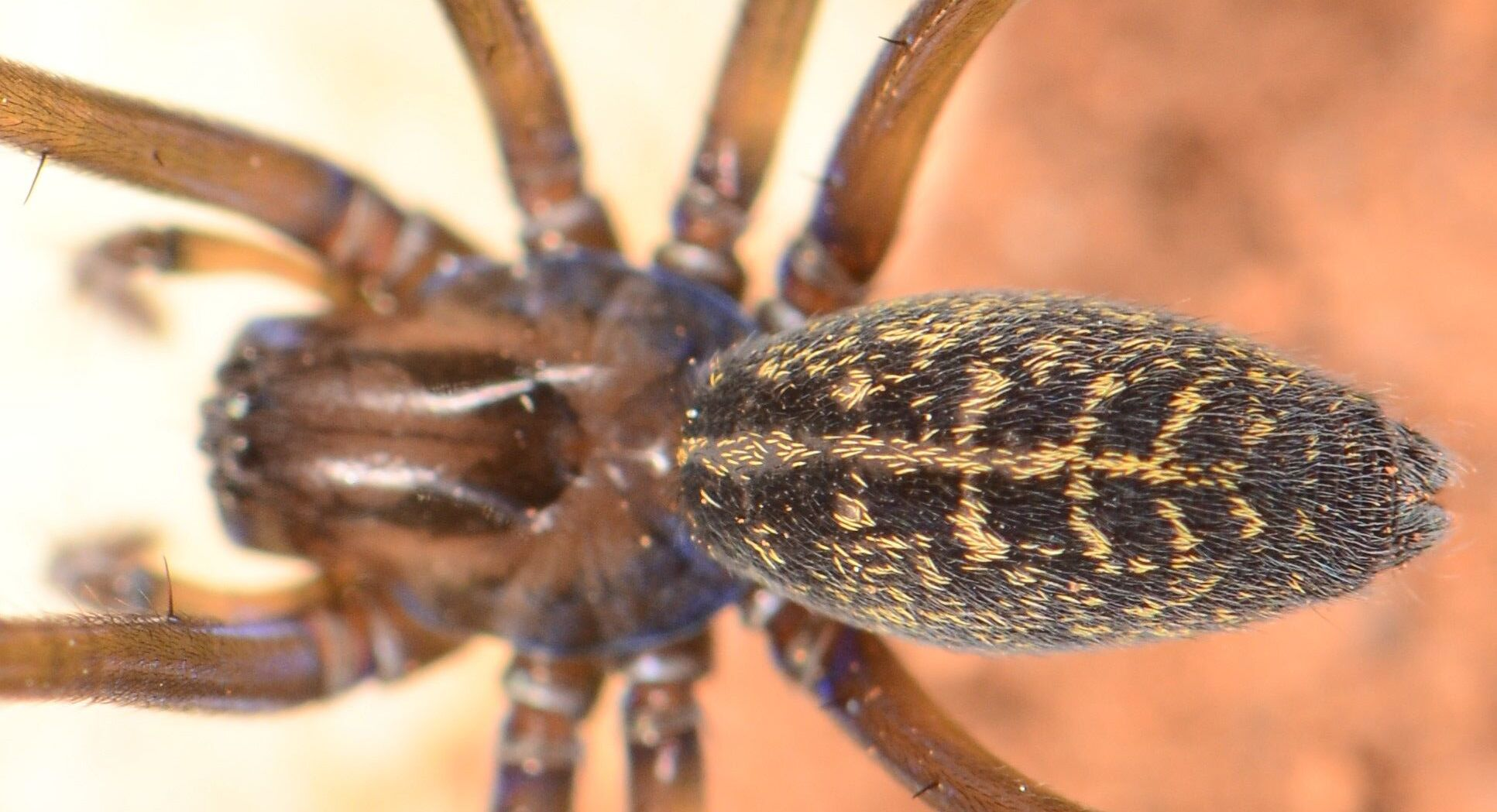
Detail of juvenile female

== Distribution ==
Themacrys irrorata is distributed across three South African provinces, Eastern Cape, KwaZulu-Natal, and Mpumalanga. The species occurs at altitudes ranging from 17 to 1,795 m above sea level.

== Habitat and ecology ==
This species inhabits the Grassland, Savanna, and Indian Ocean Coastal Belt biomes. Themacrys irrorata is a ground retreat-web cryptic spider that lives in dark places. This is a forest species found in coastal evergreen forest, coastal dune forest, and indigenous forest.

== Description ==
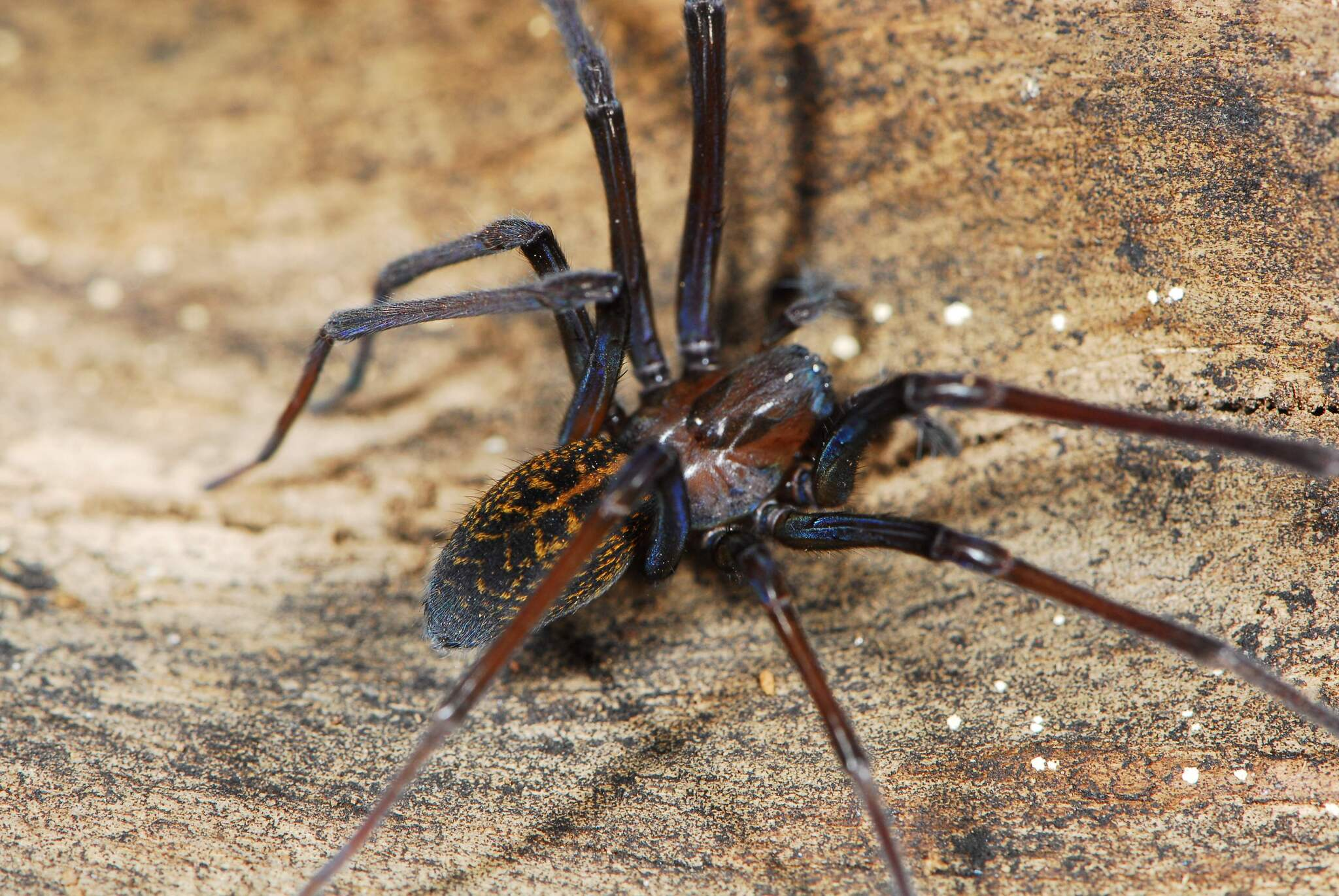
Female

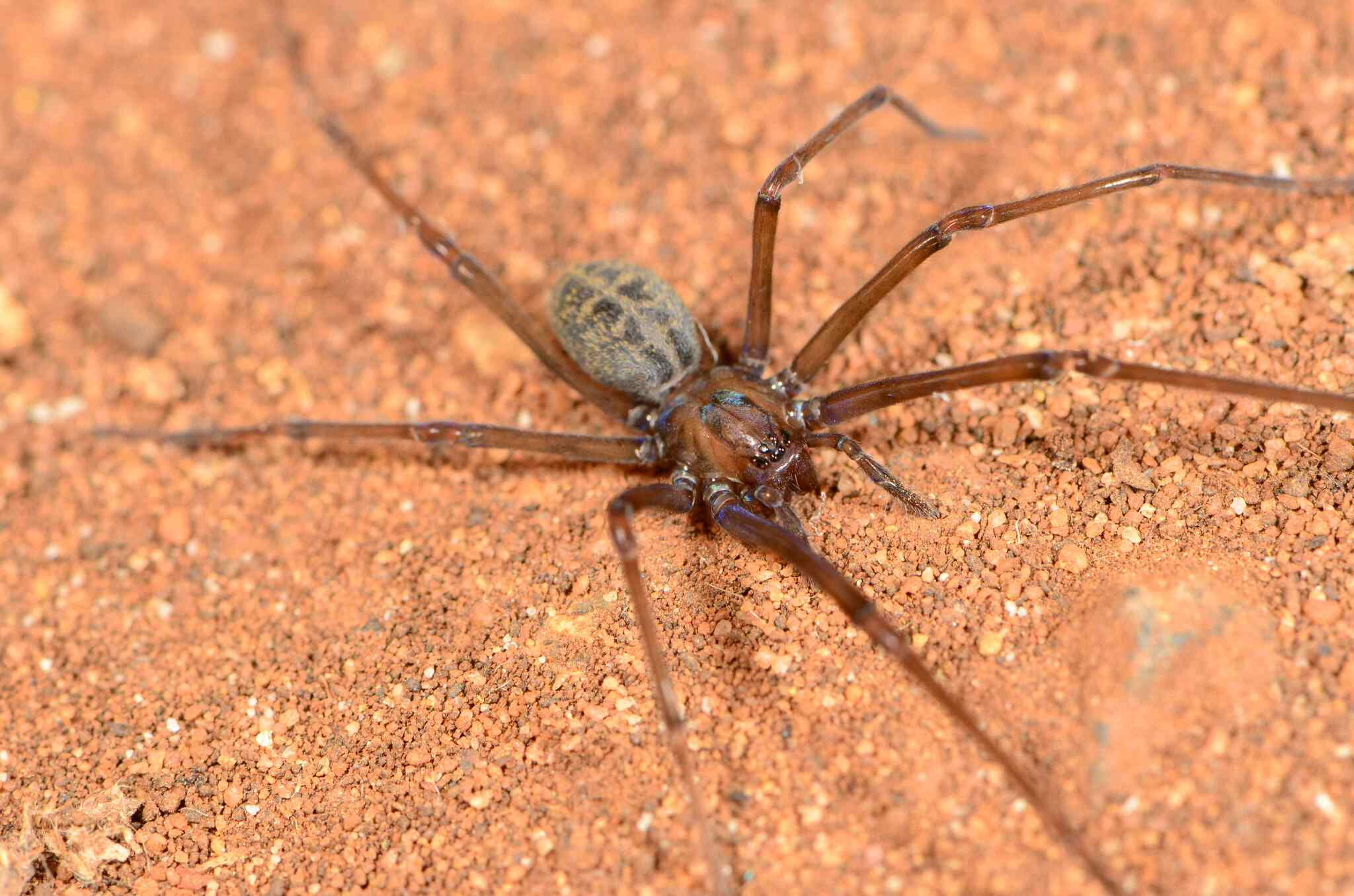
Juvenile female

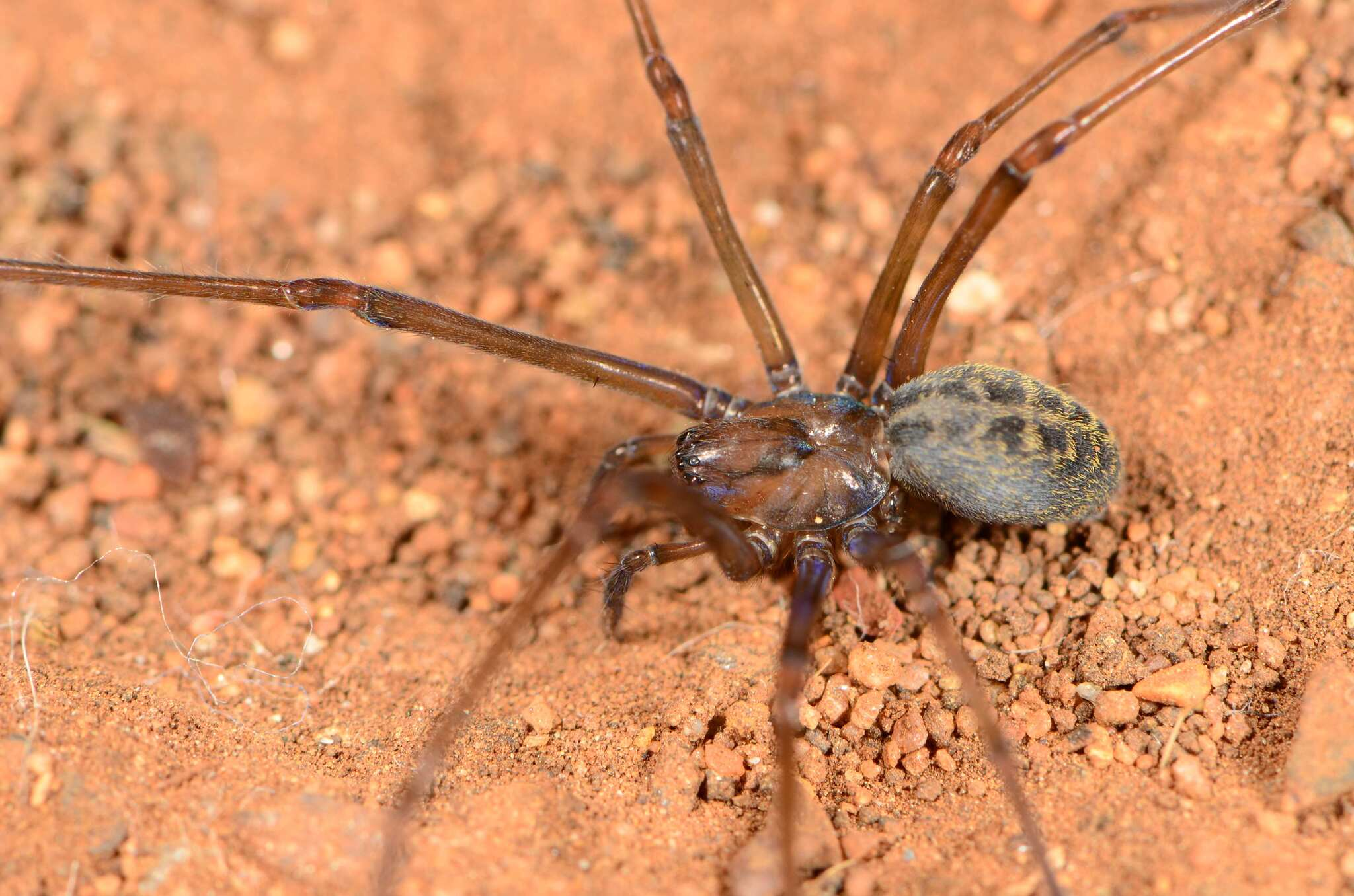
Juvenile female

== Conservation ==
Themacrys irrorata is listed as Least Concern by the South African National Biodiversity Institute. The species is recorded from three provinces including four protected areas: Enseleni Nature Reserve, Hluhluwe Nature Reserve, Dlinza Forest, and Ngotsche State Forest. Due to its wide geographical range, there are no significant threats to the species.

== Taxonomy ==
The species was originally described by Eugène Simon in 1906 from Hluhluwe Nature Reserve. It was revised by Griswold in 1990. Themacrys irrorata serves as the type species for the genus Themacrys and is known from both sexes.
