= District 12 =

District 12 may refer to:

- District 12 (Ho Chi Minh city), Vietnam
- Schwamendingen, Zürich, Switzerland, also known as District 12
- District 12, an electoral district of Malta
- District 12 (Hunger Games), fictional district in the Hunger Games books and films
- District 12 (boy band)

== See also ==
- District 6 (disambiguation)
- District 7 (disambiguation)
- District 8 (disambiguation)
- District 9 (disambiguation)
- District 10 (disambiguation)
- District 11 (disambiguation)
- District 13 (disambiguation)
