= District 7 School =

District 7 School may refer to:

- District 7 School (Hanson, Massachusetts)
- District 7 School (Groton, Massachusetts)

== See also ==
- District 7 (disambiguation)
