= Sector 7 =

Sector Seven, Sector 7, or variations thereon may refer to:

- Sector 7 (book), a wordless picture book created and illustrated by David Wiesner
- Sector 7 (film), a 2011 South Korean 3D science fiction action film directed by Kim Ji-hoon
- Sector 7, one of eleven geographical areas of Bangladesh during the Bangladesh Liberation War
- Sector Seven, a fictional US government agency in the 2007 film Transformers
- Sectorseven, a Canadian punk band from and in Grimsby, Ontario
- Sectorseven (album), the third studio album by Sector Seven
- Sector 7 (Gurugram) metro station, a station of the Delhi Metro in India

== See also ==
- Area 7 (disambiguation)
- District 7 (disambiguation)
- Sector 70, Mohali, a sector of Mohali, Punjab, India
- Sector 71, Mohali, a sector of Mohali, Punjab, India
- Sector 78, Noida, a sector of Noida, Uttar Pradesh, India
