= Sector 70, Mohali =

Sector 70
- Sector
- Location in Punjab, India
- Coordinates: 30.6977448°N 76.7154429°E
- Country: India
- State: Punjab
- District: Sahibzada Ajit Singh Nagar

Languages
  - Official: Punjabi
- Time zone: UTC+5:30 (IST)
- PIN: 160071
- Telephone code: 0172
- Vehicle registration: PB-65

Sector 70 is a residential and historically significant locality under Mohali, Punjab. It is bordered by Mattaur, Sector 71, Mohali, Sohana, Sector 69, as well as Phase 7, Mohali. There are around 10 parks in the locality, such as Fountain Park.

A historic Gurdwara, named Gurdwara Mata Sunder Kaur, commemorates the visits of Guru Gobind Singhji's Wife Mata Sundari, Baba Deep Singh, as well as Bhai Mani Singh. It is situated in the locality and is managed by Budha Dal. The adjacent village of Mattaur, also known as Komagata Maru Nagar, is noted for hosting an All India Congress session in 1975, which was attended by Indira Gandhi.

== Residential Societies ==
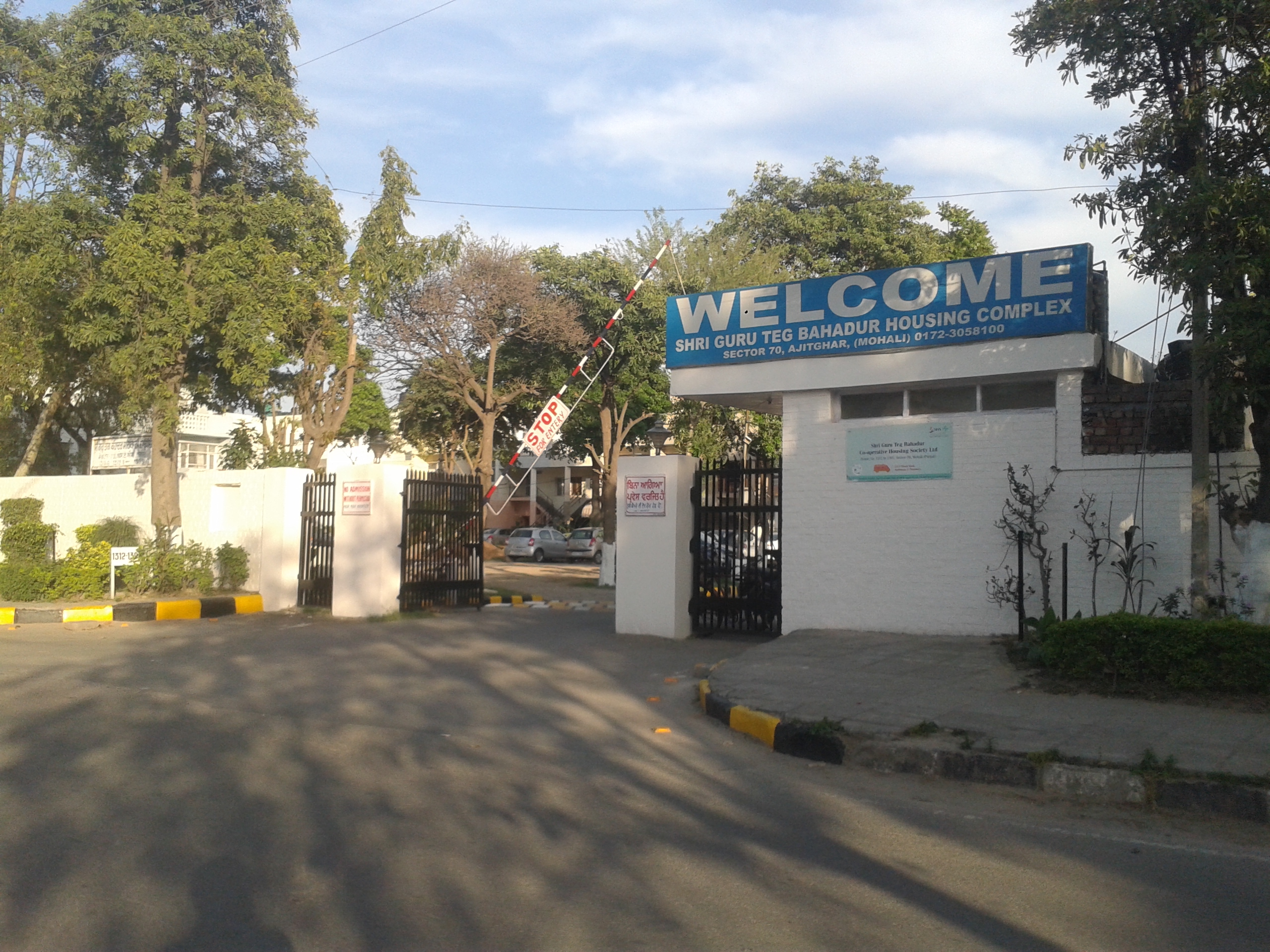
Guru Tegh Bahadur Complex

Following is a list of the Sector's societies:

- C-DAC Housing complex (only for C-DAC staff)
- Guru Tegh Bahadur Housing Complex (Society) - First-ever construction in the Sector. Built by Housefed, Punjab.
- Mundi Complex
- Karam Singh Baidwan Estate - Historical château. Estimated ₹1,000 Cr. value.
- Rishi Apartment
- Ivory Towers
- LIG House
- MIG Houses
- HIG Houses
- Homeland Heights
- Mayfair

== Facilities ==
- BSNL Telephone Exchange
- GMADA Community Centre
- CDAC Hostel
- Baidwan Confectionery

=== Banks ===
- Punjab National Bank
- Oriental Bank of Commerce
- Federal Bank
- ICICI Bank
- State Bank of India
- Kotak Mahindra Bank
- HDFC Bank
- Yes Bank
- Indus Bank

=== Healthcare ===
- Amar Hospital
- Regional Spinal Injury Center

=== Education ===
- St. Isher Singh Public School
- Saupins School
- Vivek High School
- Ashmah International School
- Karam Singh Baidwan (KSB) School

=== Religious ===
- Gurdwara Mata Sunder Kaur
- Gurdwara Singh Sabha, Sector 70
- Shiv Narain Mandir, Mattaur
- Noorani Masjid, Mattaur
- Gurdwara Singh Shaheedan, Sohana

== Access ==
Sector 70 is situated on Himalaya Marg, along the Chandigarh–Sohana Road and Mohali Bypass Road. It is well connected by road, rail, and air. The nearest airport is Chandigarh Airport, while the nearest railway station is located in Industrial Area, Phase 9. It serves as an entry point to Mohali Bus Stand from various parts of Punjab. Auto-rickshaws are readily available for commuting. A few CTU local bus services are also available, connecting the area to PGI and Landran.
