= D11 =

D11, D.XI, D XI or D-11 may refer to:

== Ships ==
- ARA La Argentina (D-11), a 1981 destroyer of the Argentine navy
- HMAS Vampire (D11), a 1956 destroyer of the Royal Australian Navy
- HMS Impulsive (D11), a 1937 United Kingdom Royal Navy destroyer which saw service during World War II
- Nueva Esparta, a Venezuelan Navy Nueva Esparta-class destroyer

== Aircraft ==
- Albatros D.XI, a 1918 German single-seat fighter biplane
- Fokker D.XI, a 1923 Dutch single-seat fighter aircraft
- Jodel D.11, a two-seat French commercial aircraft

== Locomotives ==
- Bavarian D XI, an 1895 German saturated steam locomotive model
- GS&WR Class D11, a steam locomotive of Ireland
- LNER Class D11, a class of British 4-4-0 locomotives introduced in 1919 by the Great Central Railway

== Medicine ==
- ATC code D11, Other dermatological preparations, a subgroup of the Anatomical Therapeutic Chemical Classification System
- Warthin's tumor, ICD-10 code

== Other uses ==
- DXi, DirectX Instrument plugins
- D11 motorway (Czech Republic)
- DirecTV-11, a DirecTV satellite
- Dublin 11, a Dublin, Ireland postal district
- Slav Defence, 3.Nf3, Encyclopaedia of Chess Openings code
- District 11
- Caterpillar D11, a large conventional bulldozer
- London's Metropolitan Police Specialist Firearms Command, formerly known as D11
- HDCAM (D-11), a professional digital high definition video format

== See also ==
- 11D (disambiguation)
