= 6th arrondissement =

6th arrondissement may refer to:

- 6th arrondissement of Lyon
- 6th arrondissement of Marseille
- 6th arrondissement of Paris
- 6th arrondissement of the Littoral Department, Benin
