= District 10 =

District 10 may refer to:

== Places ==
- District 10, Ho Chi Minh City, a former urban district of Vietnam
- District 10 (Zürich), in Switzerland
- District 10, an electoral district of Malta
- District 10, a police district of Malta
- District 10 School, a historic school in Margaretville, New York, US
- District 10 Schoolhouse, a historic school in Hartland, New York, US

== Art, entertainment, and media ==
- District 10 (Hunger Games), fictional district in the Hunger Games books and films
- District 10, the possible sequel to the film District 9, as referred to by Neill Blomkamp

== See also ==
- 10th arrondissement (disambiguation)
- District 9 (disambiguation)
- District 11 (disambiguation)
