= 7th arrondissement =

7th arrondissement may refer to:

- 7th arrondissement of Lyon
- 7th arrondissement of Marseille
- 7th arrondissement of Paris
- 7th arrondissement of the Littoral Department, Benin
