= District 8 =

District 8 can refer to:

- District 8 Jakarta, in Indonesia
- District 8 (Ho Chi Minh City), in Vietnam
- VIII District, Turku, in Finland
- VIII District, Budapest, in Hungary
- Riesbach, also known as District 8, in Zürich, Switzerland
- District 8, an electoral district of Malta
- District 8, a police district of Malta
- District 8 Athletic Association a secondary school sports association in Kitchener, Ontario Canada also known as District 8 or D8
- District 8 (Hunger Games), fictional district in the Hunger Games books and films
- Williams County School District 8

== See also ==
- 8th arrondissement (disambiguation)
- District 7 (disambiguation)
- District 9 (disambiguation)
