= District 13 (disambiguation) =

District 13 is a 2004 French film.

It can also refer to:

- District 13, an electoral district of Malta
- District 13: Ultimatum, a 2009 sequel to the 2004 film
- District 13 Police Station, a historic police station in Boston, Massachusetts, USA
- District 13 (Hunger Games), fiction district in the Hunger Games books and films
- Valley Stream 13 Union Free School District

== See also ==
- District 12 (disambiguation)
