= District 4 =

District 4 can refer to:

- District 4, Düsseldorf, in Germany
- District 4, Grand Bassa County, in Liberia
- District 4 (Ho Chi Minh City), in Vietnam
- District 4 (New York City Council), in the United States
- IV District, Turku, in Finland
- Aussersihl, also known as District 4, in Zürich, Switzerland
- District 4, an electoral district of Malta
- District 4, a police district of Malta
- District 4 (Hunger Games), fictional district in the Hunger Games books and films

== See also ==
- Sector 4 (Bucharest)
- District 3 (disambiguation)
- District 5 (disambiguation)
