= District 9 (disambiguation) =

District 9 is a 2009 science fiction film directed by Neill Blomkamp.

District 9 may also refer to:

== Places ==
- District 9, Boston, district for Boston City Council
- District 9, Düsseldorf, a district in that German city
- District 9, Ho Chi Minh City, a former district, now part of Thủ Đức City
- District 9, Zürich, a district in that Swiss city
- District 9, an electoral district of Malta
- District 9, a police district of Malta
- IX District, Turku, Finland
- New York's 9th congressional district, often referred to as District 9

== Art, entertainment, and media ==
- District 9 (band), a New York hardcore band profiled in the 1999 documentary film N.Y.H.C.
- Devyatyi Raion, a Russian pop-rock band whose name translates as "District 9"
- District 9 (Hunger Games), fictional district in The Hunger Games universe
- "District 9", a 2018 single by South Korean boy band Stray Kids in the extended play titled I Am Not

== See also ==
- 9th Arrondissement (disambiguation)
- District 8 (disambiguation)
- District 10 (disambiguation)
- District Six, a district in Cape Town, South Africa, that is the basis for the film
- Sector 9, a skateboard manufacturer
