= Seefeld (Zürich) =

Quarter of the city of Zurich, Switzerland

Coordinates: 47°21′45.89″N 8°32′54.61″E

- Quarter of Zurich
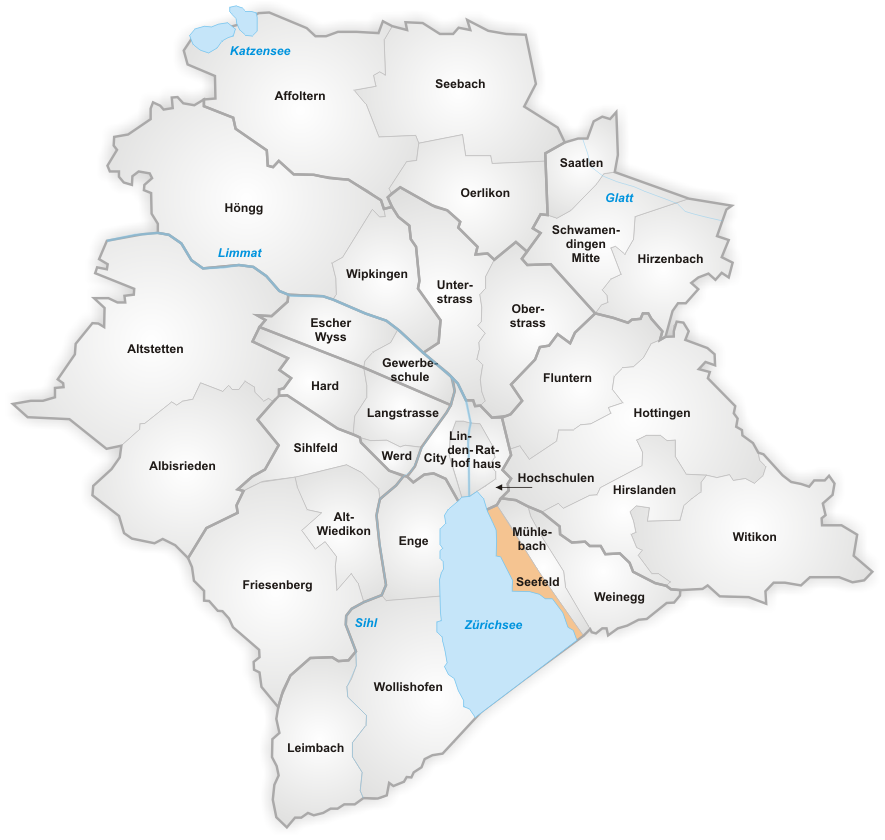
- The quarter of Seefeld in Zürich
- Country: Switzerland
- Canton: Zurich
- Municipality: Zurich
- District: Riesbach

Seefeld (Swiss Standard German pronunciation: [ˈzeːfɛld]) is a quarter in the district 8 of Zürich.

It was a part of Riesbach municipality that was incorporated into Zürich in 1893. The quarter has a population of 5,807 distributed over an area of 2.42 km^{2} (0.93 sq mi); 71.6% (1.76 km^{2} (0.68 sq mi)) of the district's area belongs to Lake Zürich.

== Quaianlagen ==
Aerial view (1970)

Hafen Riesbach, meaning Riesbach harbour area is situated between Seefeldquai and Blatterwiese. The harbour itself is as the Enge harbour used as a private-owned marina. 2004, the old kiosk at the popular open lido at Riesbachstrasse was replaced by a polygonal pavilion was designed by the architects Andreas Furrimann and Gabrielle Hächler, and now houses a small restaurant. As well as the Seefeldquai, it is part of the historical Quaianlagen, and combines park designs from different design periods. The stone pillar Klausstud originally stood in the lake and served as a border designation of the medieval right of ban of the city republic of Zürich. At that place also ended the fishing rights of the urban fishermen, and from here the Einsiedeln Abbey pilgrims proved their honour to the Protestantic city by lowering the volume of their prayers and songs. Since the landfills in the construction of the quais, the pillar stands in the middle of the park. The sculpture by Henry Moore is named Sheep Piece, 1971–72, and was donated in 1976. The Pavillon Le Corbusier, the former Centre Le Corbusier – Heidi Weber Museum, an art museum dedicated to the work of the Swiss-French architect Le Corbusier, is situated between Seefeldquai and Blatterwiese. Between Blatterwiese and Bellerivestrasse, in 1993 the Chinese Garden Zürich was inaugurated.

== Other points of interest ==
Other points of interest include the Suchard Museum and Bellerive Museum, the two lake shore baths Seebad Utoquai and Strandbad Tiefenbrunnen, the Botanical Garden (Weinegg quarter) of the University of Zürich, some old mansions and the Mühle Tiefenbrunnen, a brewery and mill converted to a cultural centre. In Seefeld quarter, you can find an above-average number of delicatess and hairdress shops, and law firms. As a residential district, Seefeld quarter is very popular, but cheap apartments usually are unavailable.

== Transportation ==
Public transport include Tiefenbrunnen railway station of the Zürich S-Bahn on lines S6 and S16 stopping there, and Stadelhofen railway station, one of the S-Bahn's nodal stations is nearby. For local use, Zürich tram routes 2 and 4, trolley bus line 33, bus lines 912 and 916 to the surrounding municipalities. ZSG station Zürichhorn is another public transport service.

== Gallery ==
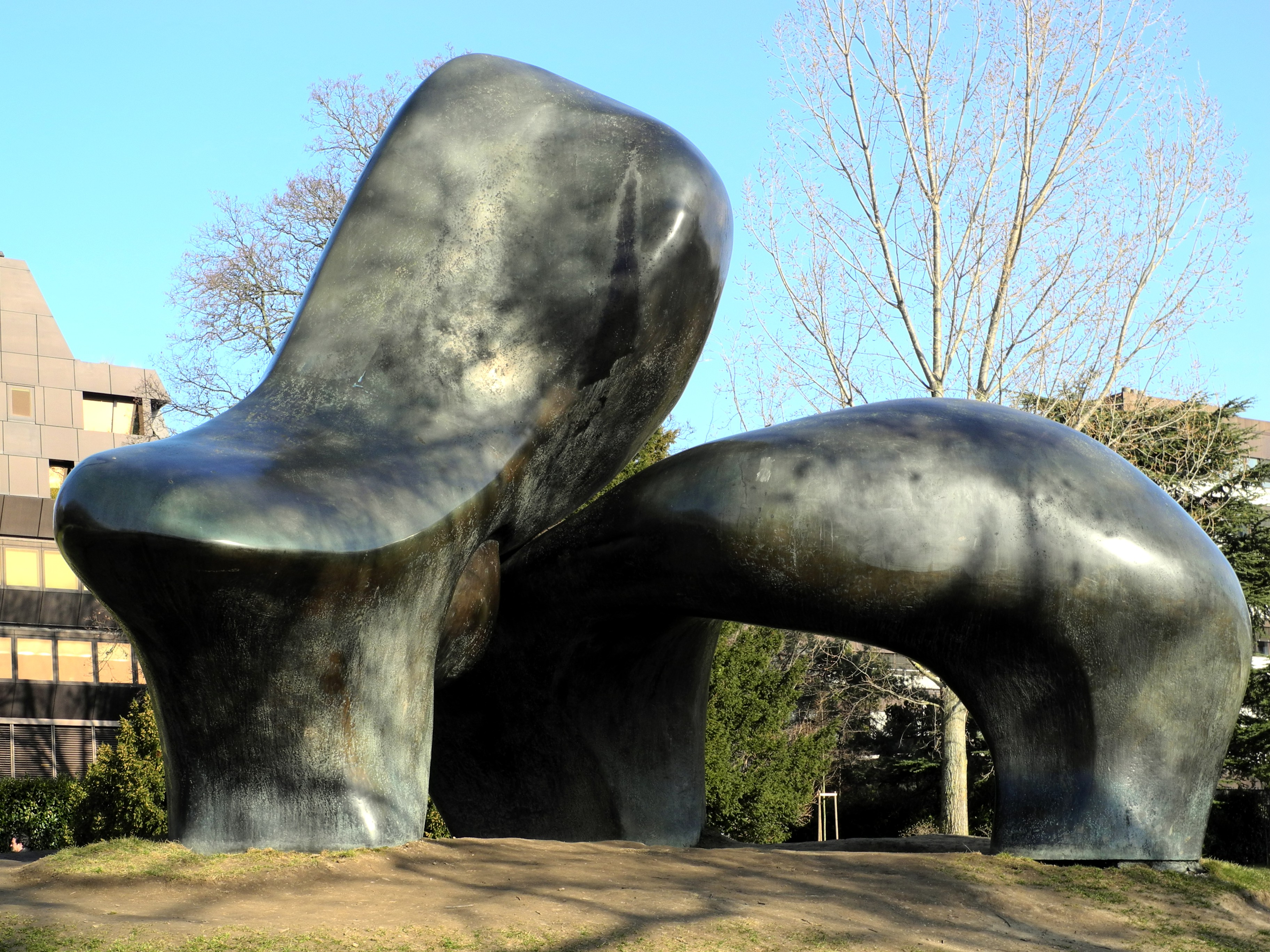
Sheep Piece, 1971–72 by Henry Moore (Riesbach harbour)

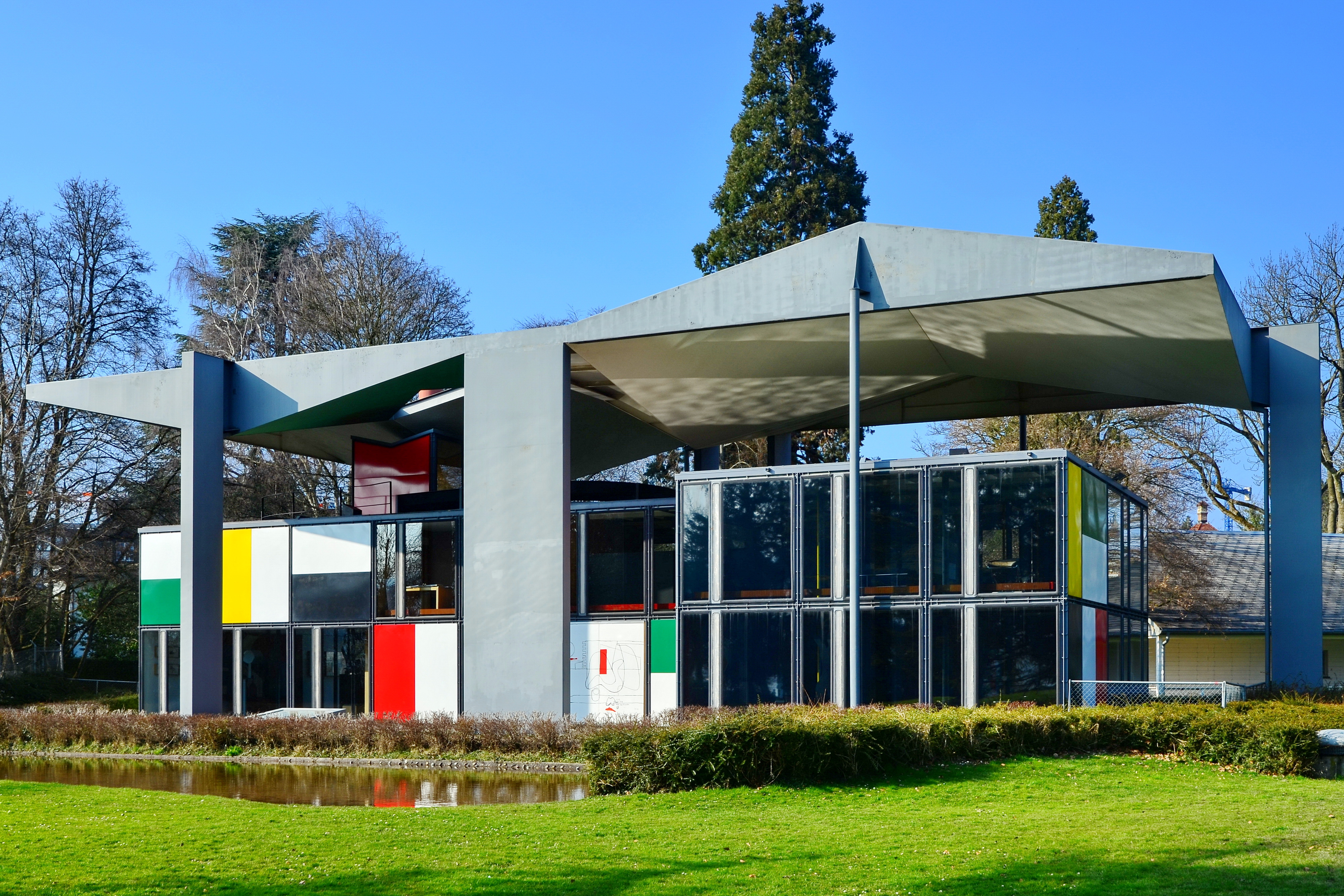
Pavillon Le Corbusier

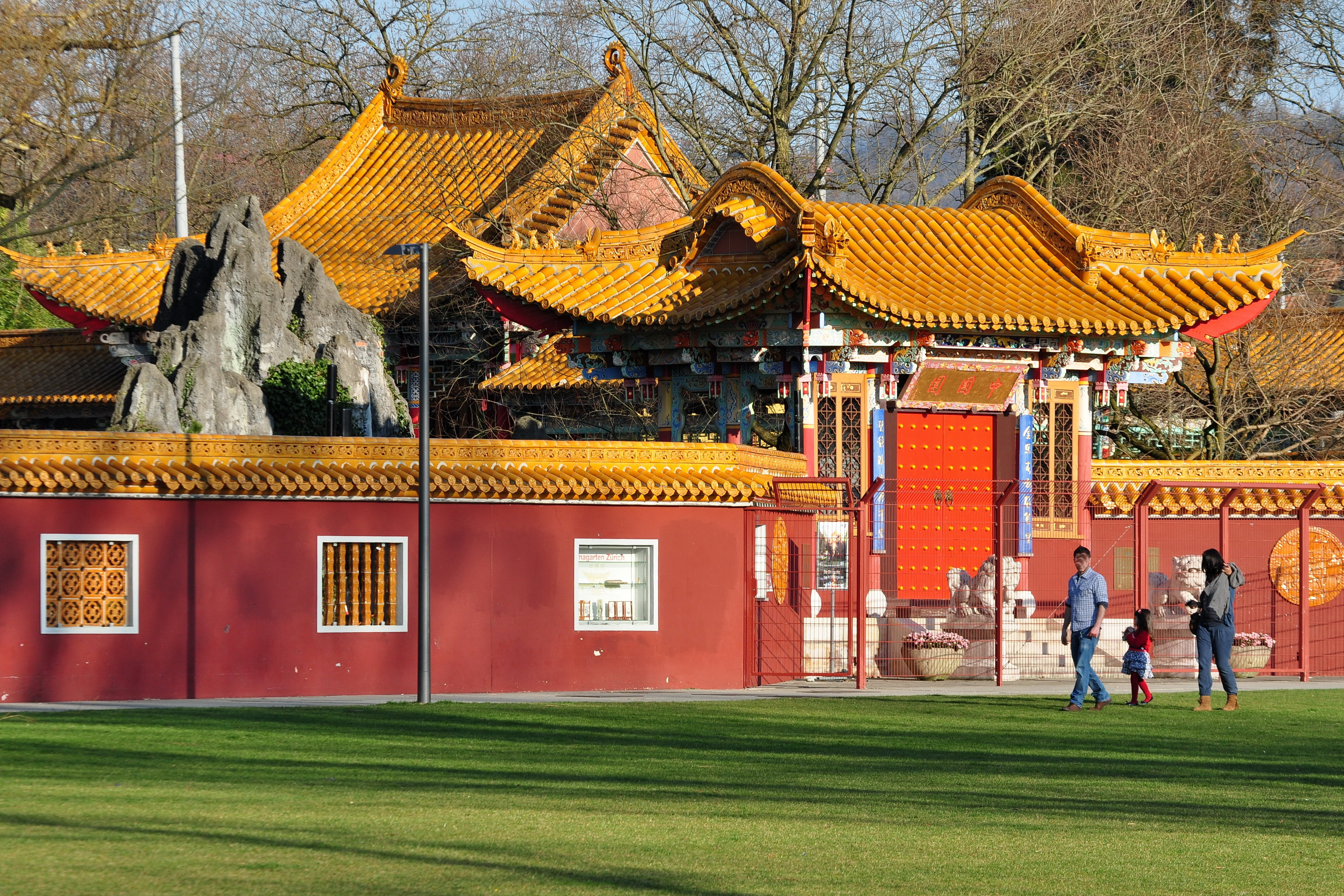
Chinese Garden in partnership with Kunming

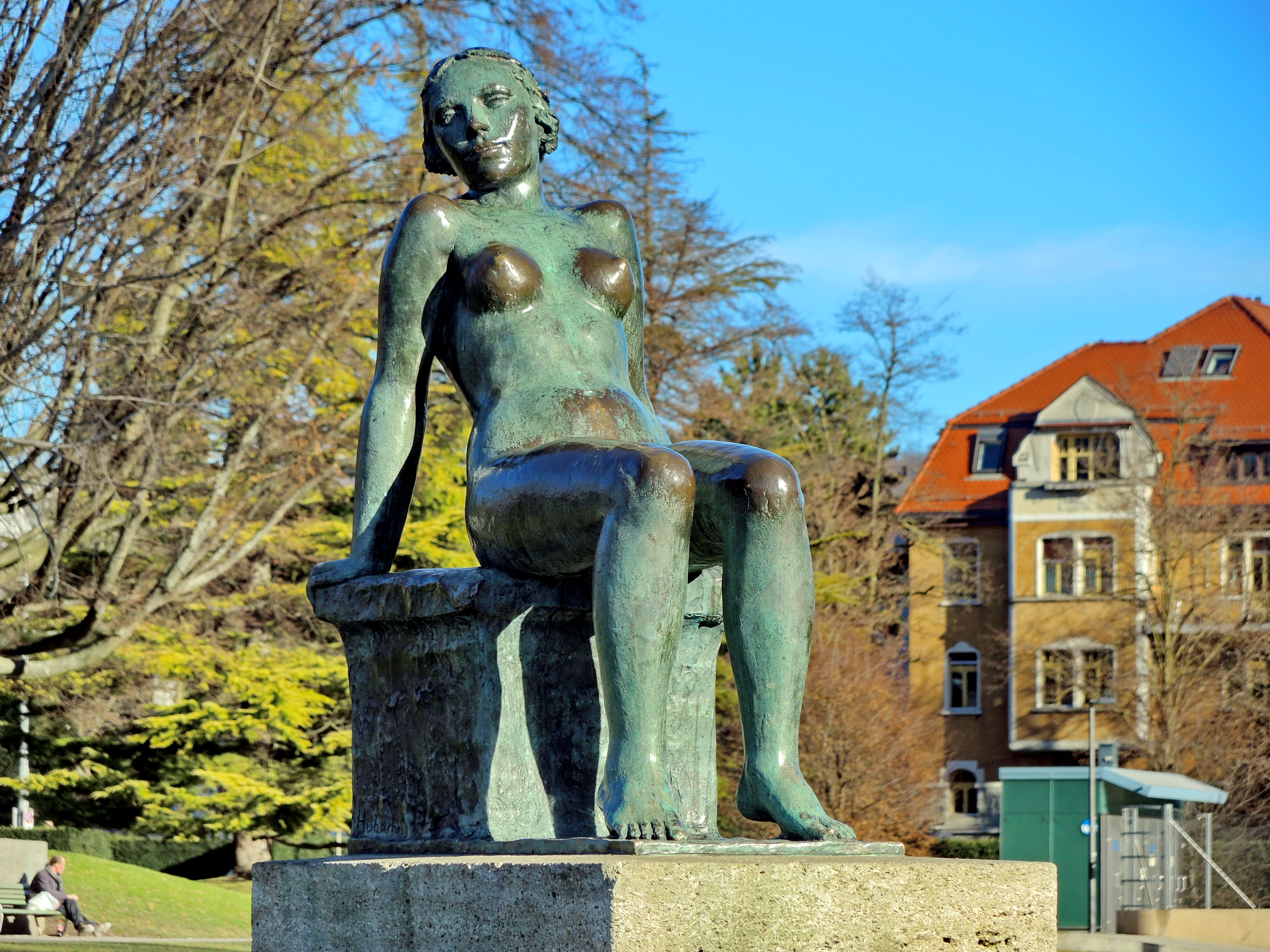
Sitzende by Hermann Hubacher at Blatterwiese

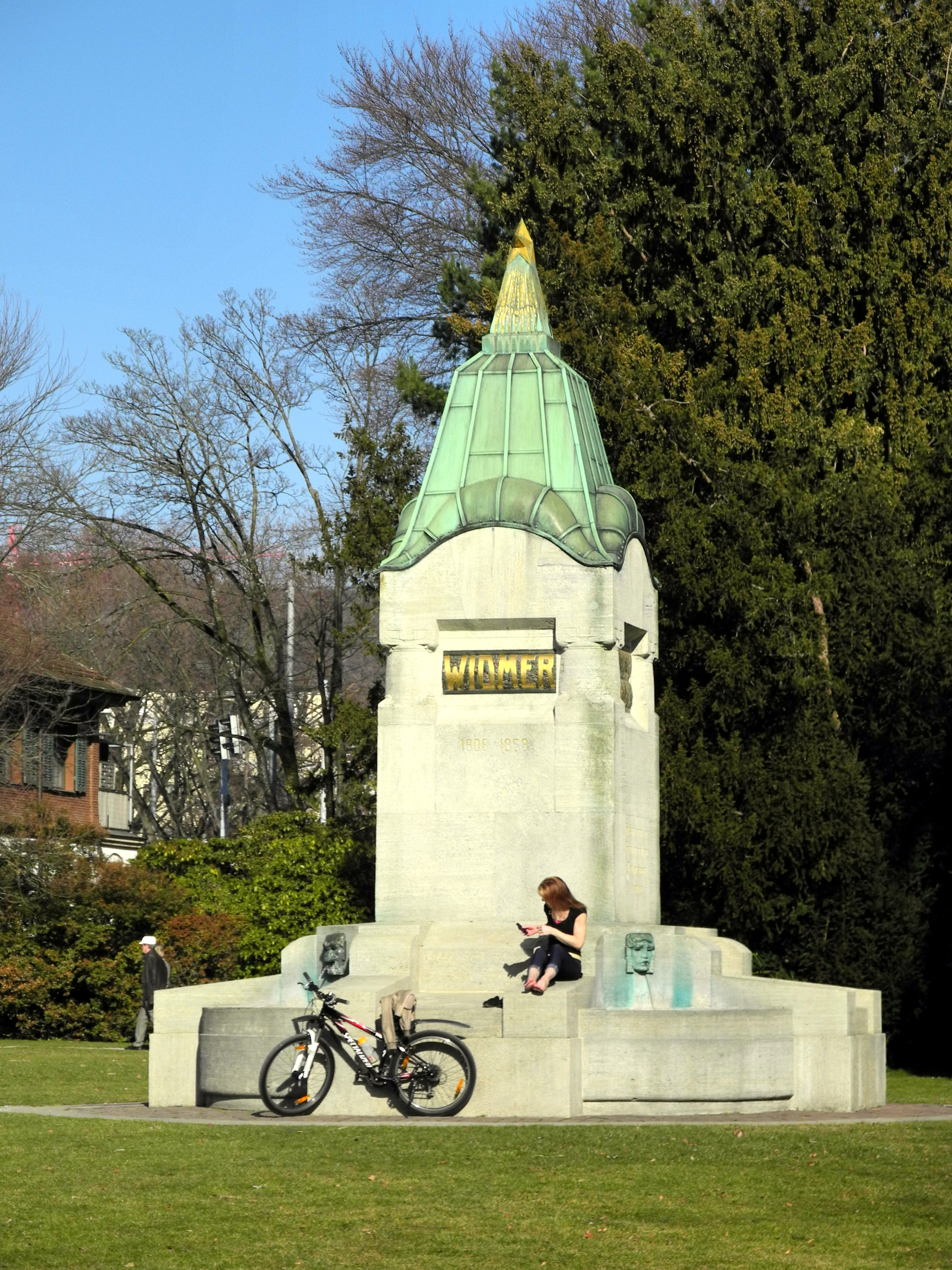
Fountain memorial for the composer Alberich Zwyssig and the Swiss Psalm's poet Leonhard Widmer (Zürichhorn)

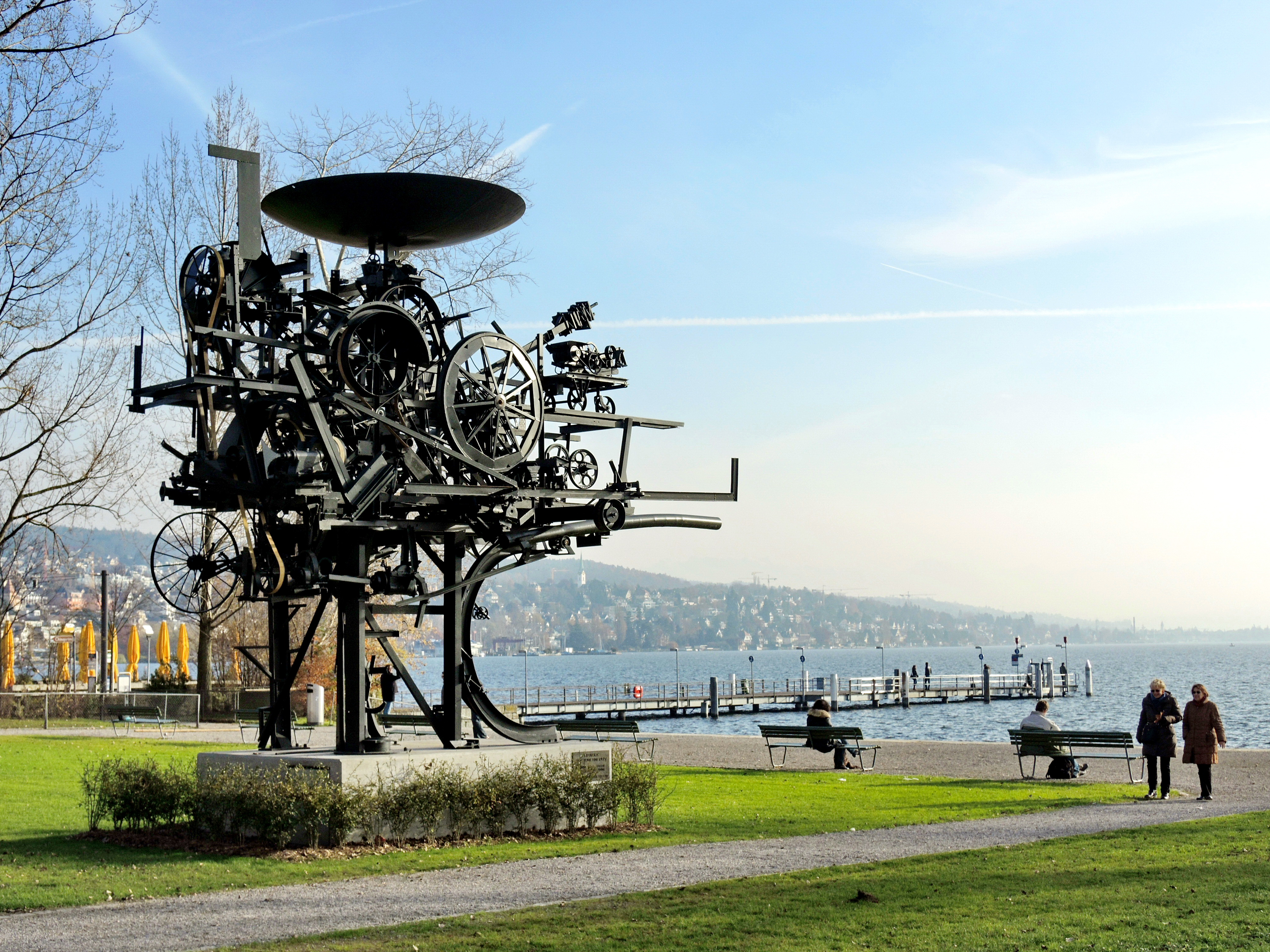
Tinguely's Heureka at the so-called Zürichhorn

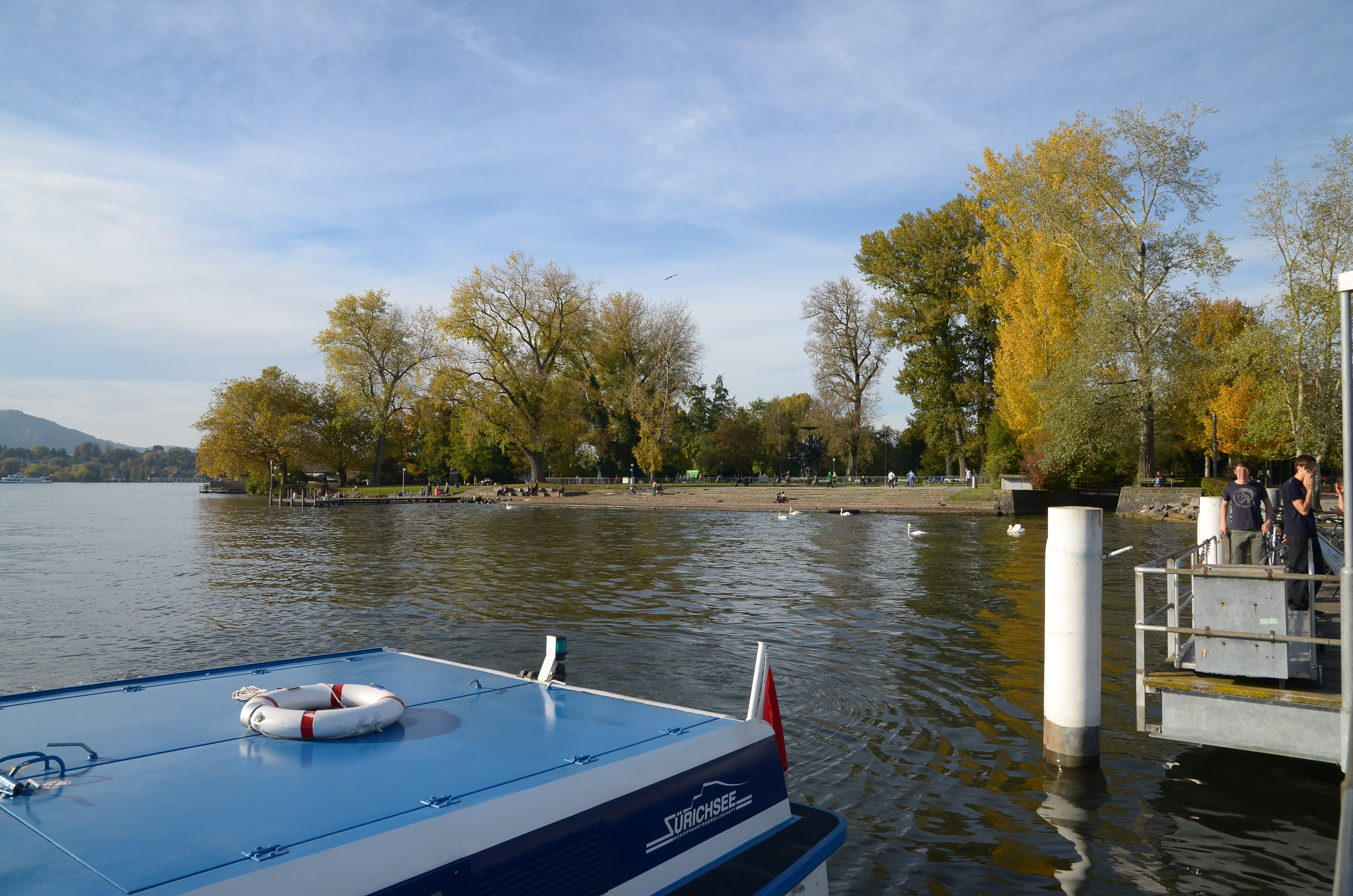
Lake Zurich at ZSG landing gate Zürichhorn

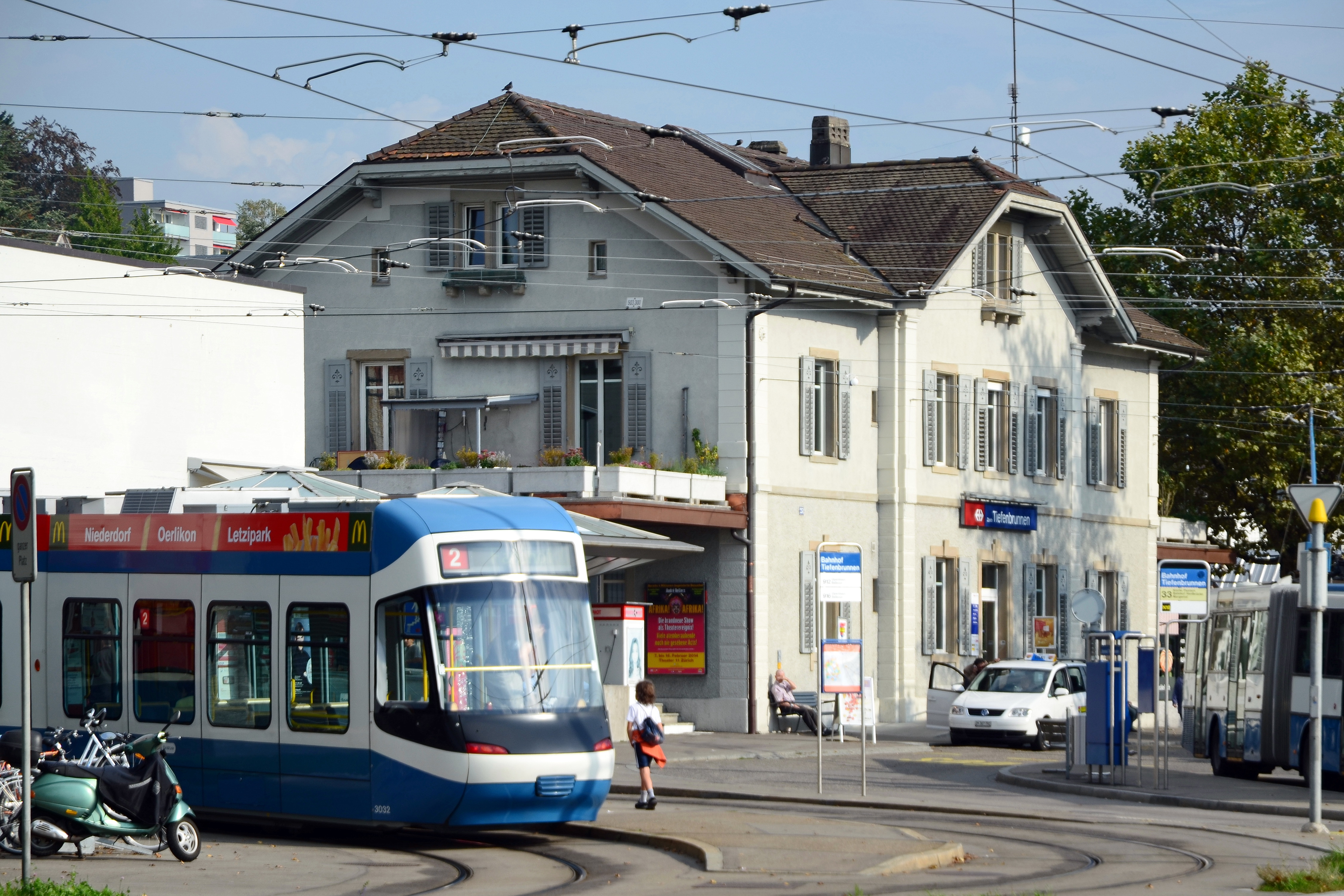
Railway station Zürich Tiefenbrunnen
