= 9th arrondissement of the Littoral Department =

9th arrondissement
- Arrondissement
- Interactive map of 9th arrondissement
- Coordinates: 6.370235°N 2.427778°E
- Country: Benin
- Department: Littoral Department
- Commune: Cotonou

Population (2002)
  - Total: 61,585
- Time zone: UTC+1 (WAT)

9th arrondissement is an arrondissement in the Littoral department of Benin. It is an administrative division under the jurisdiction of the commune of Cotonou. According to the population census conducted by the Institut National de la Statistique Benin on February 15, 2002, the arrondissement had a total population of 61,585.
