= 9th arrondissement =

9th Arrondissement may refer to:

- 9th arrondissement of Lyon, France
- 9th arrondissement of Marseille, France
- 9th arrondissement of Paris, France
- 9th arrondissement of the Littoral Department, Benin
