= 11D =

11D or 11d may refer to:

- GCR Class 11D, a class of British 4-4-0 steam locomotive
- Kepler-11d, an exoplanet orbiting the star Kepler-11

== See also ==
- D11 (disambiguation)
