= District 7 =

District 7 could refer to:

- District 7, Ho Chi Minh City, Vietnam
- District 7 (Zürich), Switzerland
- District 7, Düsseldorf, Germany
- VII District, Turku, Finland
- District 7 School (Groton, Massachusetts), United States
- District 7 School (Hanson, Massachusetts), United States
- District 7, an electoral district of Malta
- District 7, a police district of Malta

== See also ==
- Area 7 (disambiguation)
- District 6 (disambiguation)
- District 8 (disambiguation)
- Sector 7 (disambiguation)
