= Riesbach =

District 8 District of the city of Zürich
- District
- Flag Seal

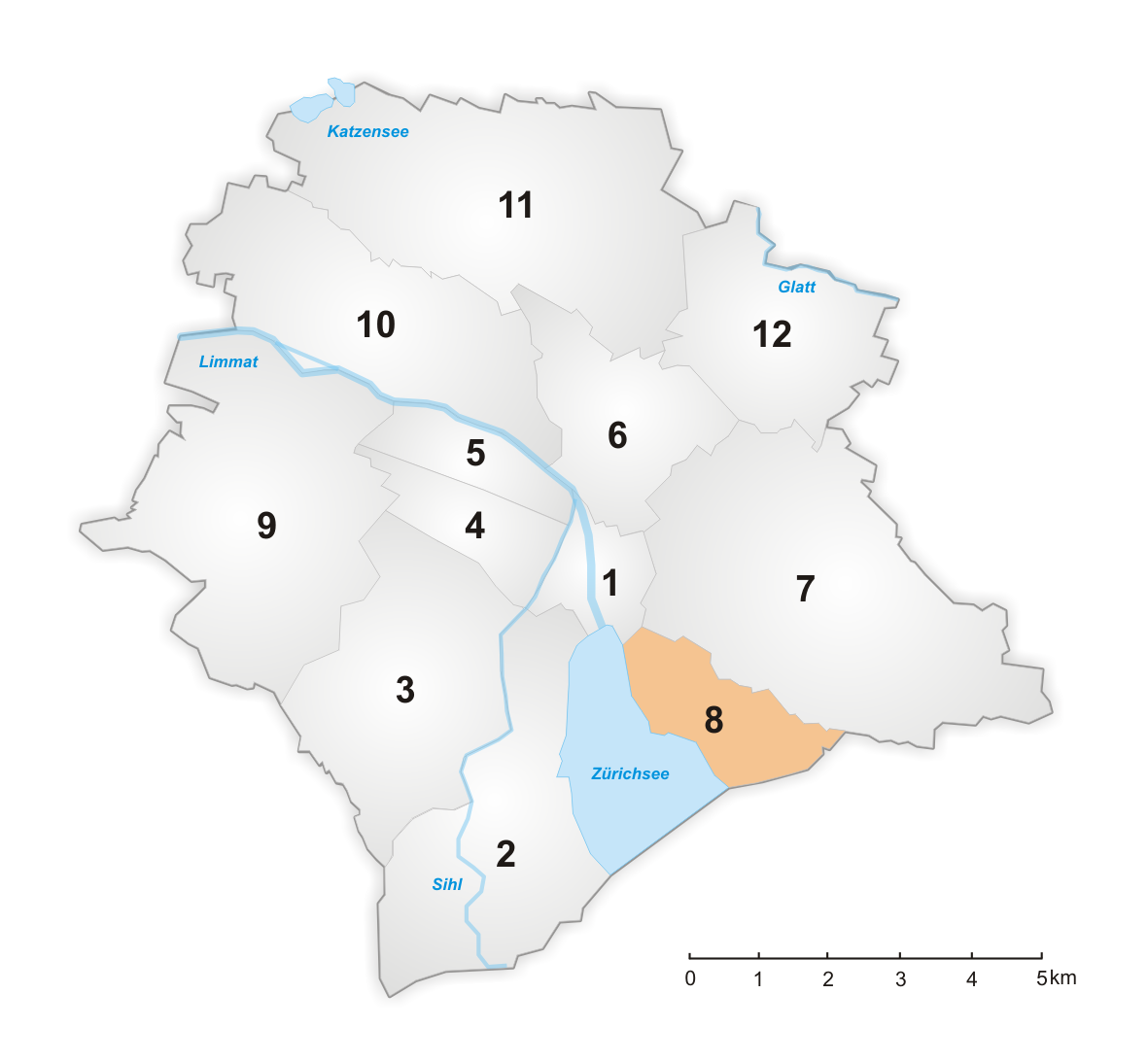
- Coordinates: 47.355°N 8.561°E
- Country: Switzerland
- Canton: Zürich
- City: Zürich

Area
  - Total: 4.81 km^{2} (1.86 sq mi)

Population (2019)
  - Total: 16,178
  - Density: 3,190/km^{2} (8,300/sq mi)
- District Number: 8
- Quarters: Seefeld; Mühlebach; Weinegg

Riesbach is District 8 of the Swiss city of Zürich and comprises the quarters Seefeld, Mühlebach and Weinegg. It was formerly an independent municipality on the eastern shore of Lake Zürich and was incorporated into the city in 1893. Today the district contains several parks along the lakefront as well as major medical institutions.

== History ==
Archaeological finds indicate prehistoric settlement in the area of present-day Riesbach, including Stone and Bronze Age remains in the Seefeld area and Iron Age burial mounds on the Burghölzli hill. In the Middle Ages Riesbach developed as a dispersed rural settlement that belonged to the manorial estate of Stadelhofen, acquired by the city of Zürich in 1257.

Rapid development began in the 19th century after the demolition of Zürich’s city fortifications in 1834. One of the first major projects was the construction of Seefeldstrasse between 1836 and 1839. Industry developed in the Seefeld quarter, gradually replacing the traditional textile cottage industry. Despite this development, Riesbach increasingly became a residential district for wealthy citizens of Zürich.

In 1876 the municipality of Riesbach applied for a concession to operate a horse-drawn tramway. From 1882 to 1896 the horse-drawn tram of the Zürcher Strassenbahn AG connected Riesbach with Zürich’s main railway station. The line was taken over by the city in 1896 and electrified in 1900. Riesbach was incorporated into the city of Zürich in 1893.

The present-day Zürich District 8 occupies the territory of the former municipality of Riesbach and comprises the quarters Seefeld, Mühlebach and Weinegg.

== Parks and institutions ==
Riesbach contains several parks and major medical institutions. Parks in the district include those of the Quaianlagen and the Zürichhorn, as well as the Botanical Garden of the University of Zürich, which opened in 1977.

Several medical institutions are located in Riesbach, including the Psychiatric University Hospital Burghölzli (established 1870), the Schulthess Clinic (1883), the Swiss Epilepsy Centre (1886), the Balgrist University Hospital (1912), and the University Children’s Hospital Zürich, which opened in 2024.

== Gallery ==
Aerial view by Walter Mittelholzer (1937)

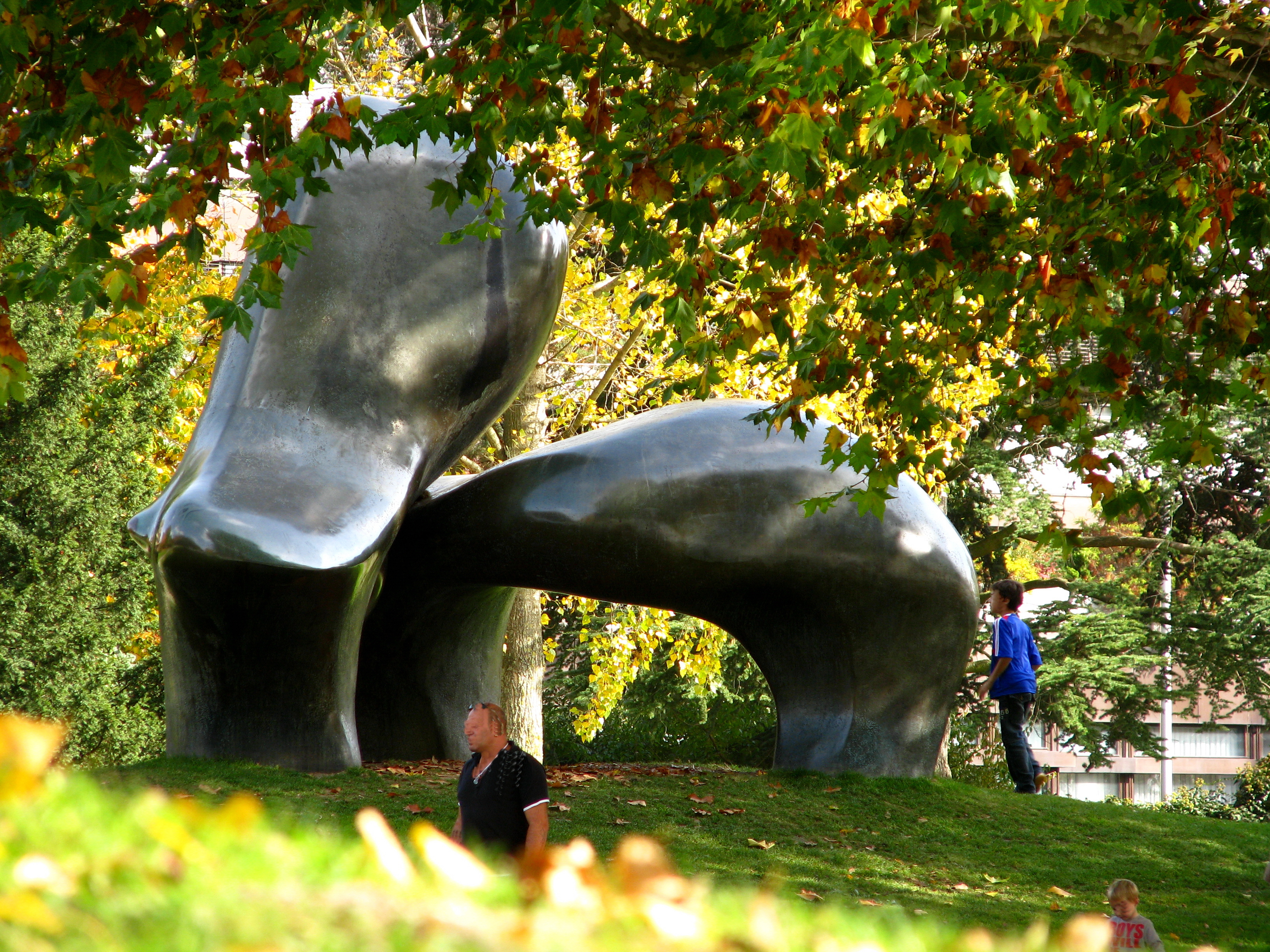
Sheep Piece by Henry Moore (Hafen Riesbach)

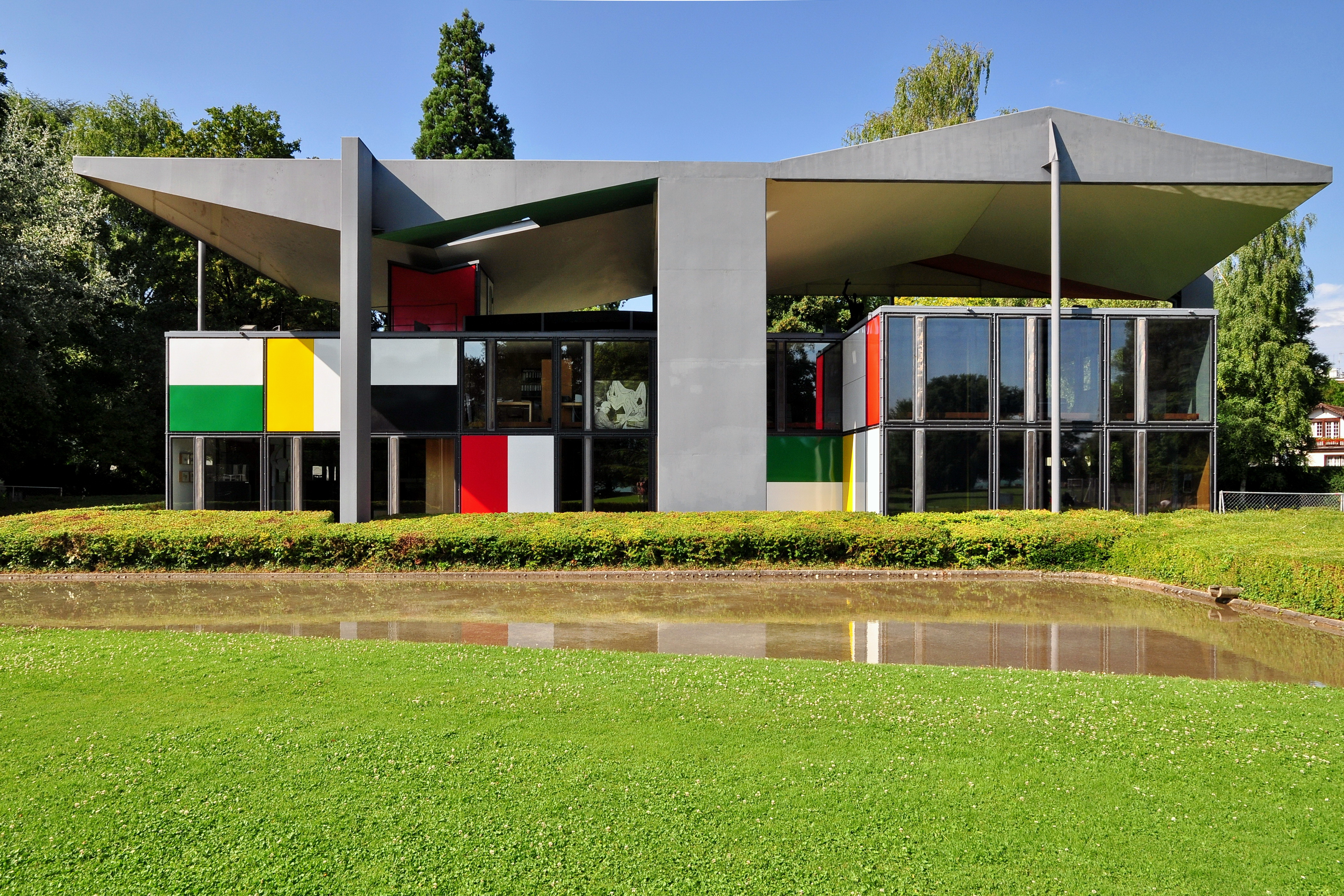
Centre Le Corbusier (Heidi Weber Museum)

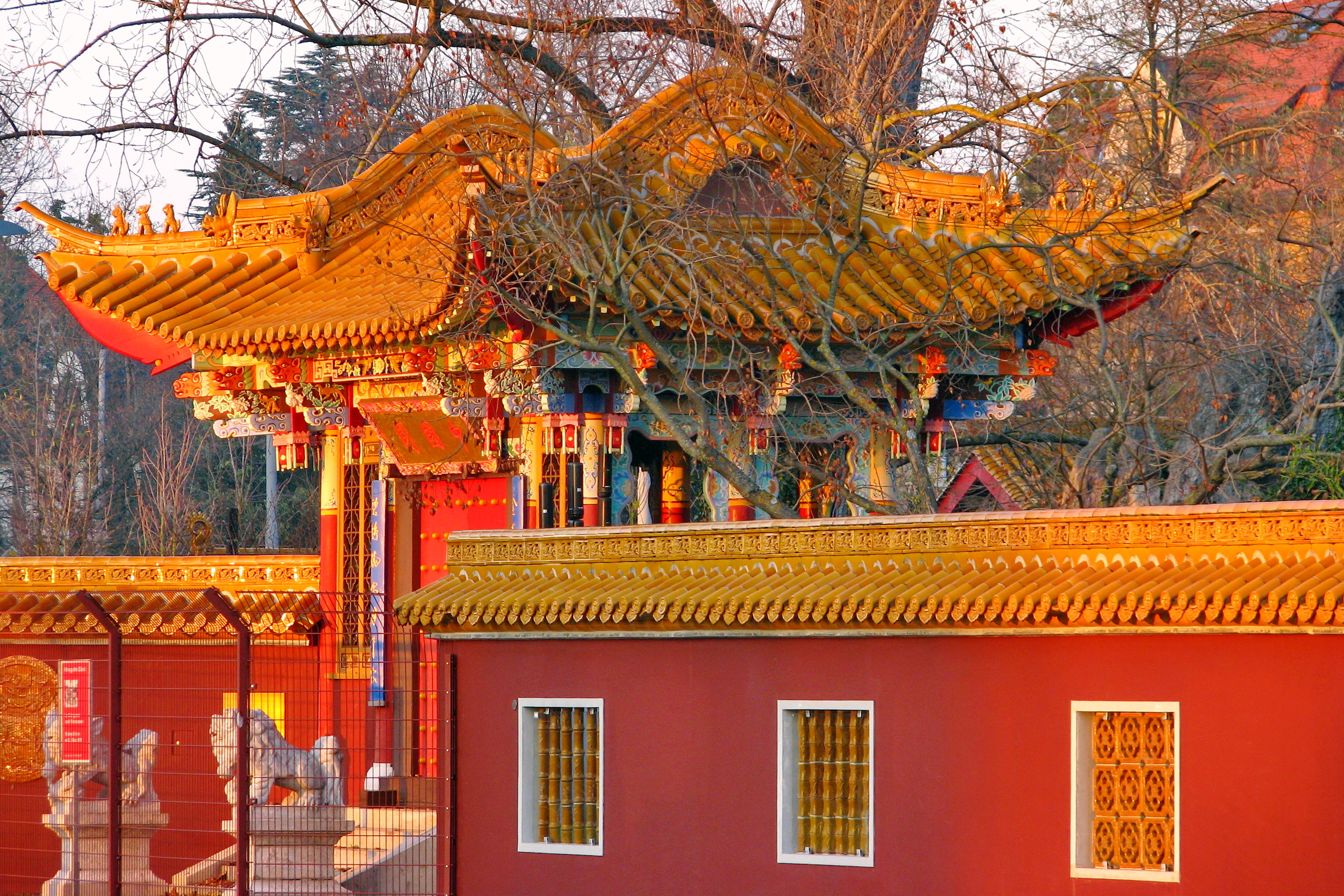
Chinese Garden Zürich

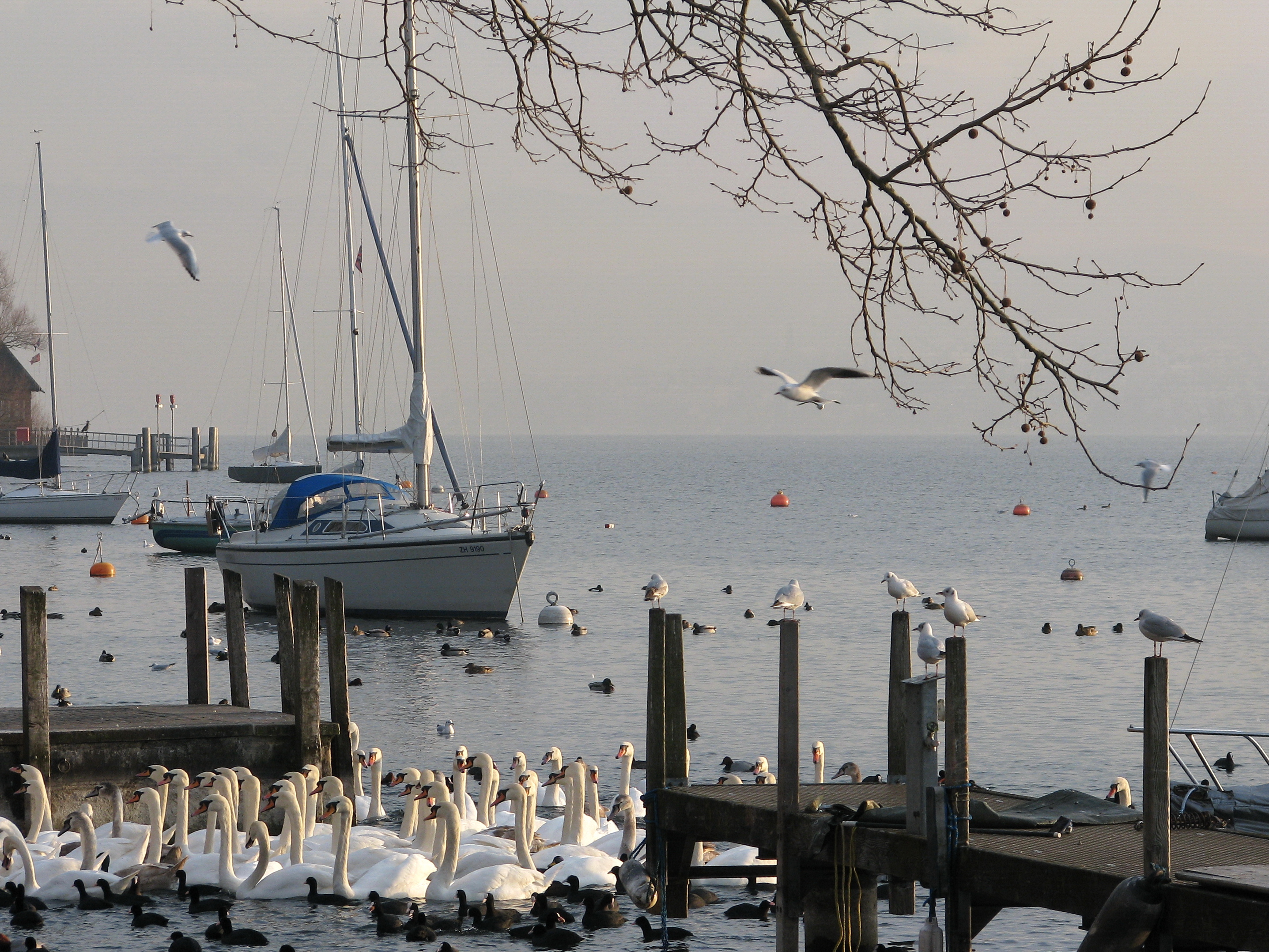
Riesbach harbour
