= Gurdwara Mata Sunder Kaur =

Gurdwara in Punjab, India

Gurdwara Mata Sunder Kaur is a historical site visited by Mata Sundari, Baba Deep Singh and Bhai Mani Singh during their trip to Delhi after the evacuation of Guru Gobind Singh, his family and Khalsa Army from Anandpur Sahib. The Gurdwara is located in Sector 70, Mohali, Punjab. The Gurdwara is controlled by Budha Dal Nihang Sikhs.

== See also ==
- Ajitgarh
- Gurdwara Amb Sahib
- Sector 70, Mohali
