= Mattaur =

- Town
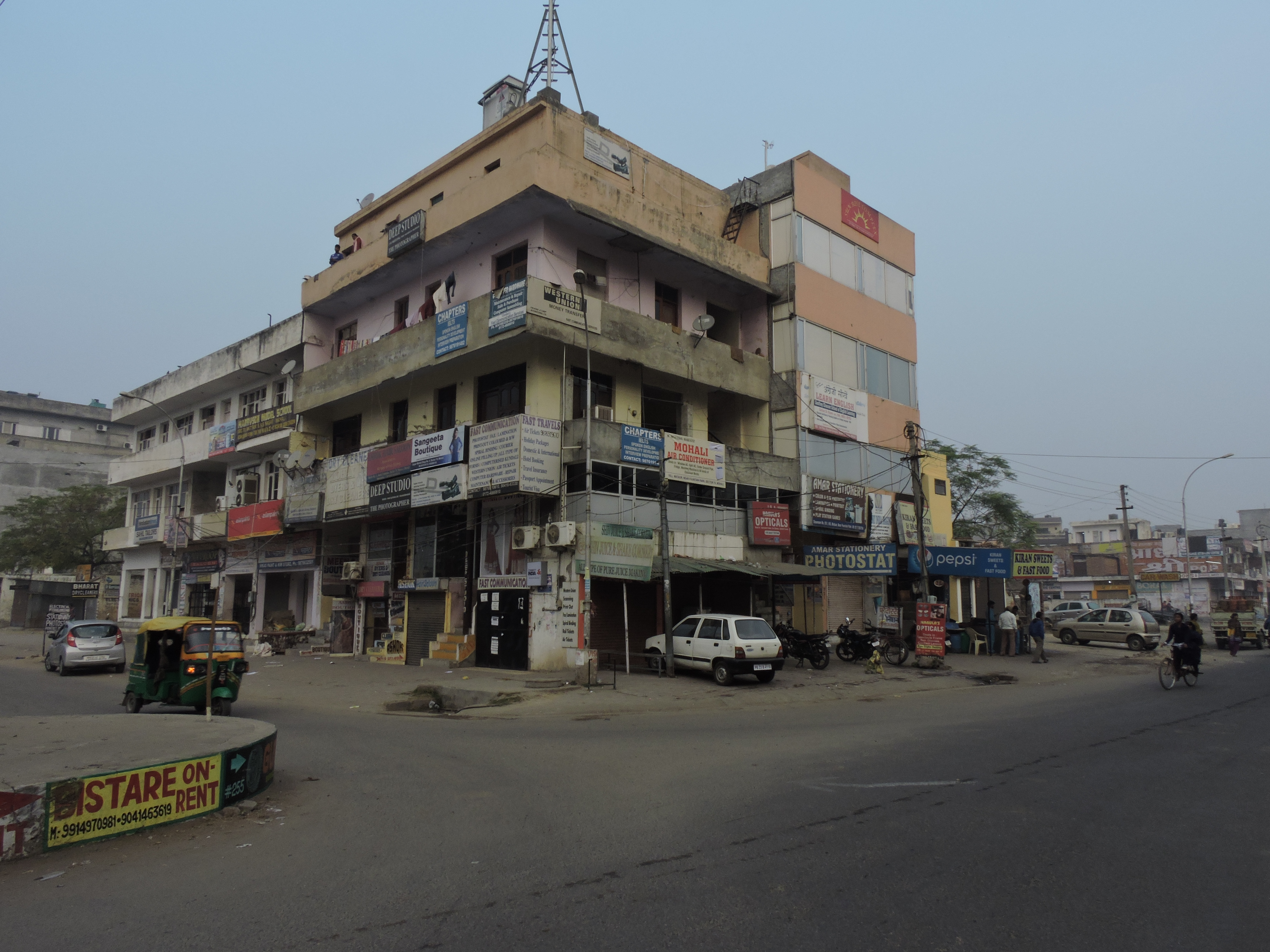
- Mattaur (2015)
- Country: India
- State: Punjab

Languages
  - Official: Punjabi
- Time zone: UTC+5:30 (IST)
- Postal code: 160071
- Vehicle registration: PB-65

Mattaur (or Komagata Maru Nagar) is a hamlet under Sectors 70 & 71, Mohali. The village houses the Karam Singh Baidwan Estate.

== History ==
Mattaur, then known as Komagata Maru Nagar, hosted the 75th Plenary Session of the Indian National Congress (INC) on 31 December 1975 as well as 1 January 1976. Then Prime Minister Indira Gandhi was there. D. K. Barooah was chosen as Congress president.
