= 8th arrondissement =

8th Arrondissement may refer to:

- 8th arrondissement of Lyon
- 8th arrondissement of Marseille
- 8th arrondissement of Paris
- 8th arrondissement of the Littoral Department, Benin
