= 11th arrondissement =

11th arrondissement may refer to,

- 11th arrondissement of Paris, France
- 11th arrondissement of Marseille, France
- 11th arrondissement of the Littoral Department, Benin
