= Sector 71, Mohali =

Sector 71
- Sector
- Location in Punjab, India
- Coordinates: 30.703971°N 76.709552°E
- Country: India
- State: Punjab
- District: Mohali district

Languages
  - Official: Punjabi
  - Others: Hindi
- Time zone: UTC+5:30 (IST)
- PIN: 160071
- Telephone code: 0172
- Vehicle registration: PB-65

Sector 71 is a locality under Mohali, Punjab. It is bordered by Mattaur, Sector 72, Sector 70, Mohali, Sohana, Sector 60, as well as Sector 76, Mohali.

== Access ==
Sector 71 is situated on Himalaya Marg, along the Chandigarh–Sohana Road and Mohali Bypass Road. It is well connected by road, rail, and air. The nearest airport is Chandigarh Airport, while the nearest railway station is located in Industrial Area, Phase 9. It serves as an entry point to Mohali Bus Stand from various parts of Punjab. Auto-rickshaws are readily available for commuting. A few CTU local bus services are also available, connecting the area to PGI and Landran.

== LeOrion Observatory ==
The LeOrion Observatory is located in Sector 71. The name of the centre is a portmanteau of the names of the constellations Leo and Orion. LeOrion provides the public with information about astronomical events, particularly lunar and planetary observations. Stellar observations are also carried out for spectrum analysis.

The observatory houses a Meade LX90-ACF 12-inch telescope. The observatory has been under private ownership since 26 September 2016 and is intended to be opened to the public and amateur astronomers from across North India. Its main focus is to capture the spectra of binary stars, planetary nebulae, supernova remnants, comets, redshifts or blueshifts, as well as stars with an apparent magnitude greater than +6.5, which are not visible to the naked eye.

== KSB Gardens ==
The KSB Gardens, under the Karam Singh Baidwan Estate, are Sector 71's so-called "Flesh, Heart, & Soul". Housed across the Sector's entire border, the KSB Gardens exemplify the Sector's "Ecology + Technology" essence.

KSB Gardens, Mohali
