= Regional Spinal Injury Centre =

Regional Spinal Injury Centre is an Indian medical institution which provides treatment and rehabilitation to patients with spinal disabilities and injuries and also with orthopedic and neurological problems. It was established in Cuttack and has four locations in India.

Regional Spinal Injury Centre (RSIC) is located at Cuttack (Odisha), Jabalpur (Madhya Pradesh), Mohali (Punjab) and Bareilly (Uttar Pradesh).
