= Mühlebach (Zürich) =

Quarter of the city of Zurich, Switzerland

Coordinates: 47°21′41.48″N 8°33′17.89″E

- Quarter of Zurich
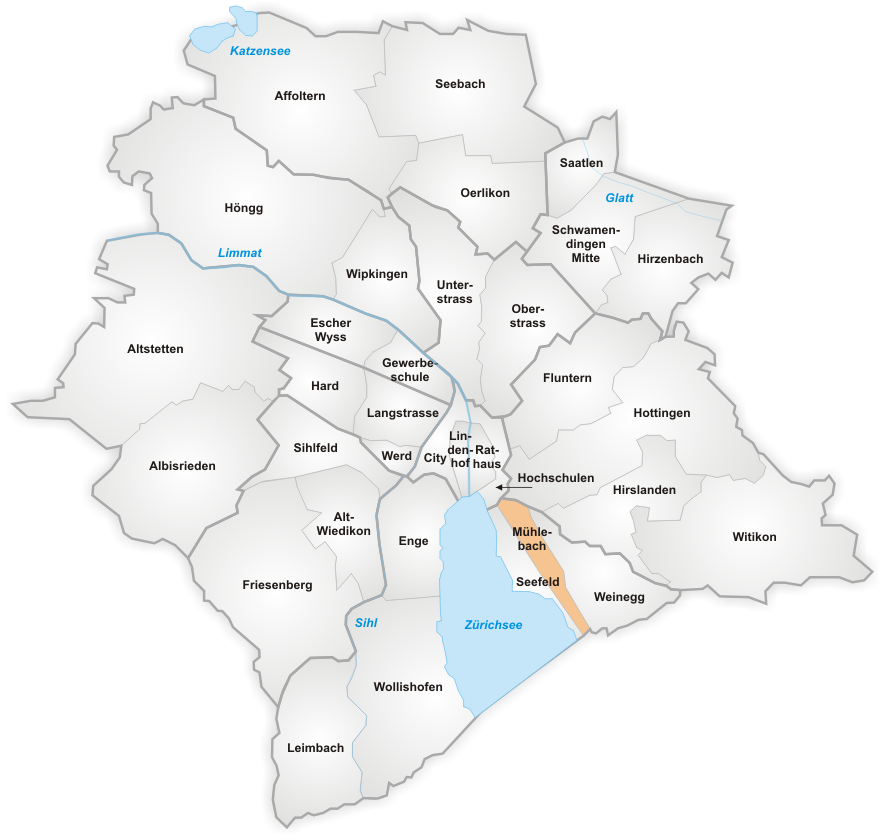
- The quarter of Mühlebach in Zürich
- Country: Switzerland
- Canton: Zurich
- Municipality: Zurich
- District: Riesbach

Mühlebach is a quarter in the district 8 of Zürich.

It was part of Riesbach municipality that was incorporated into Zürich in 1893.

As of 2025, the quarter has a population of 6,456 distributed on an area of 0.639 km^{2} (0.247 sq mi).

== Gallery ==
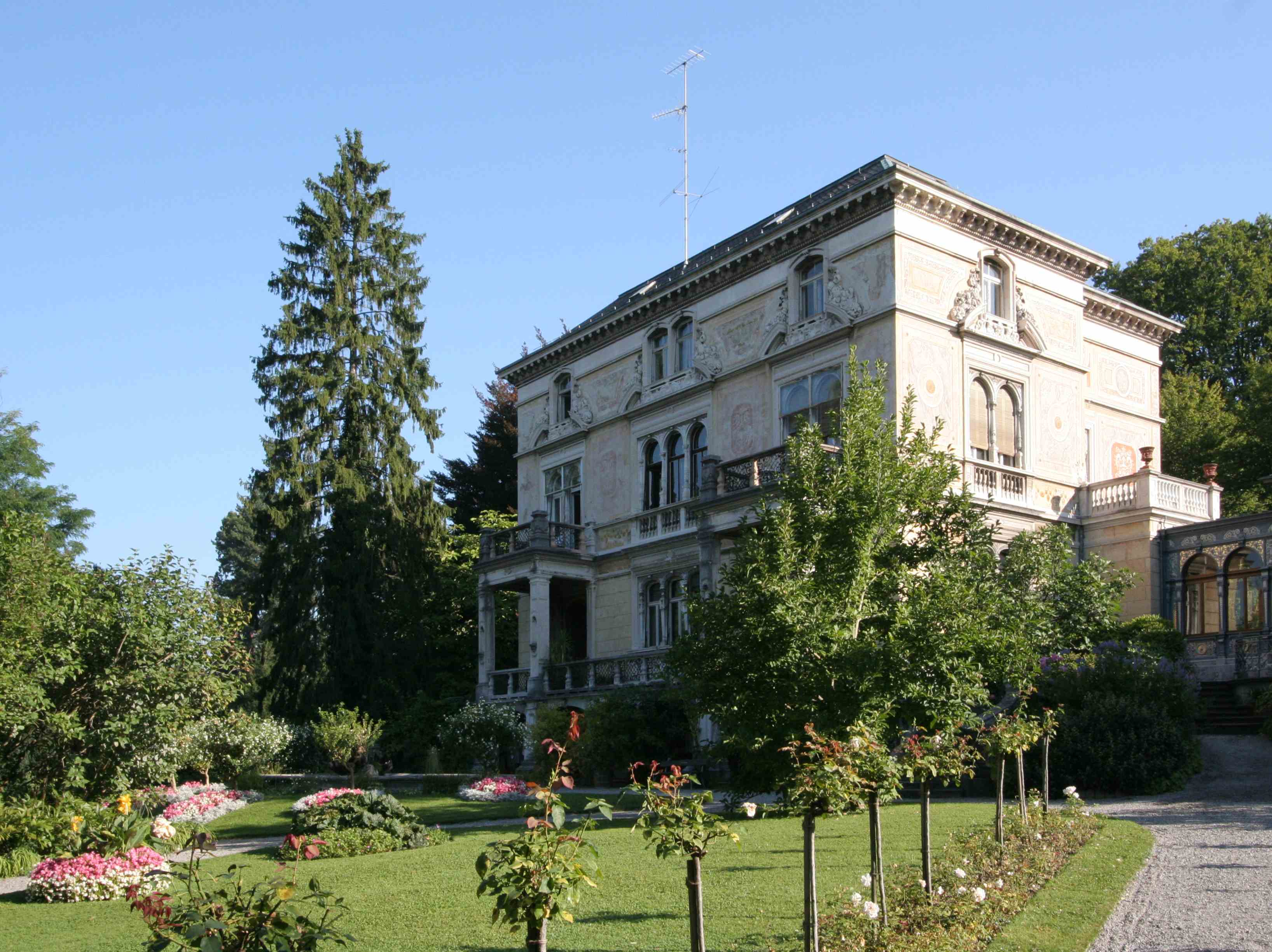
Villa Patumbah

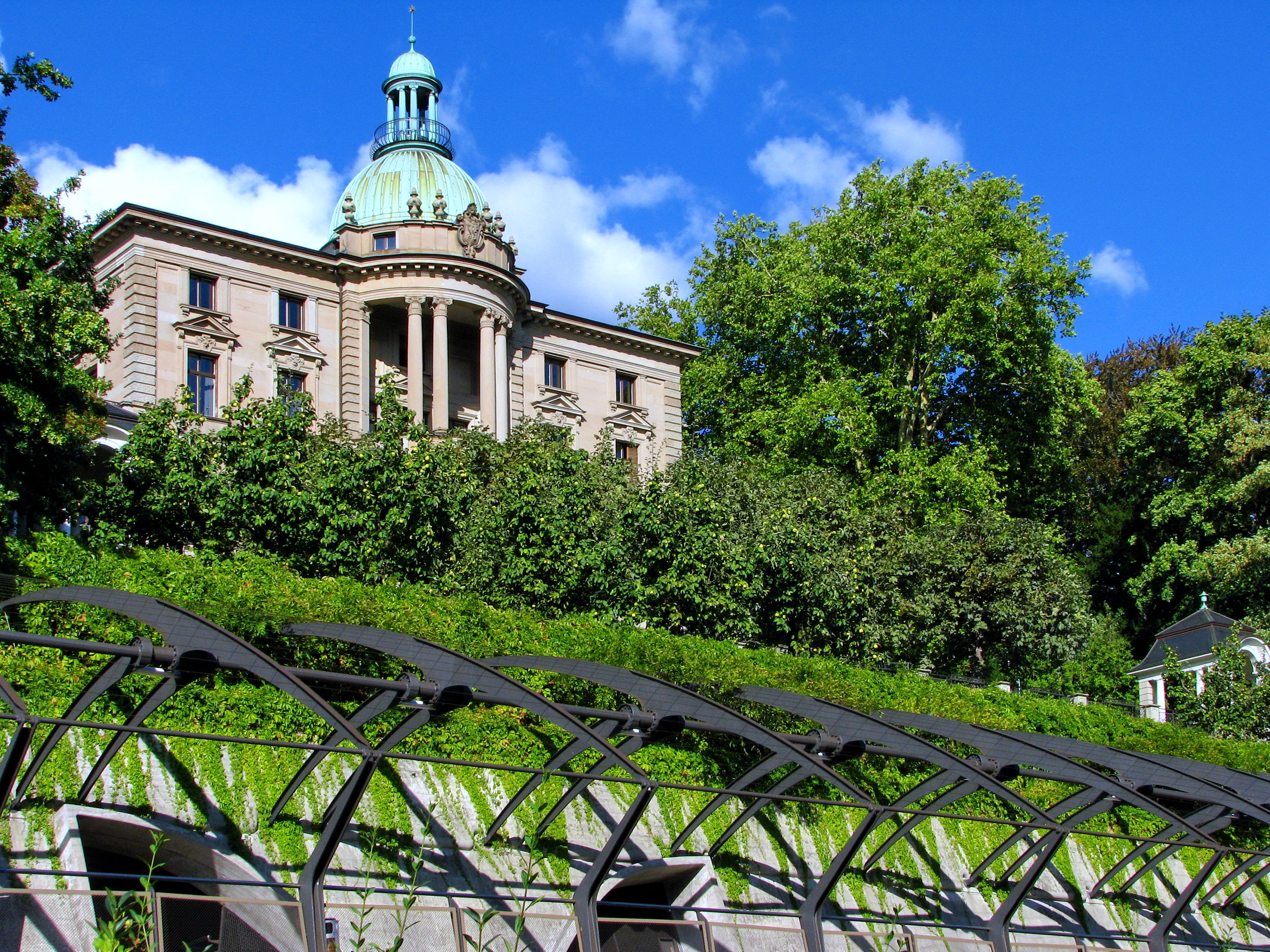
Villa Hohenbühl

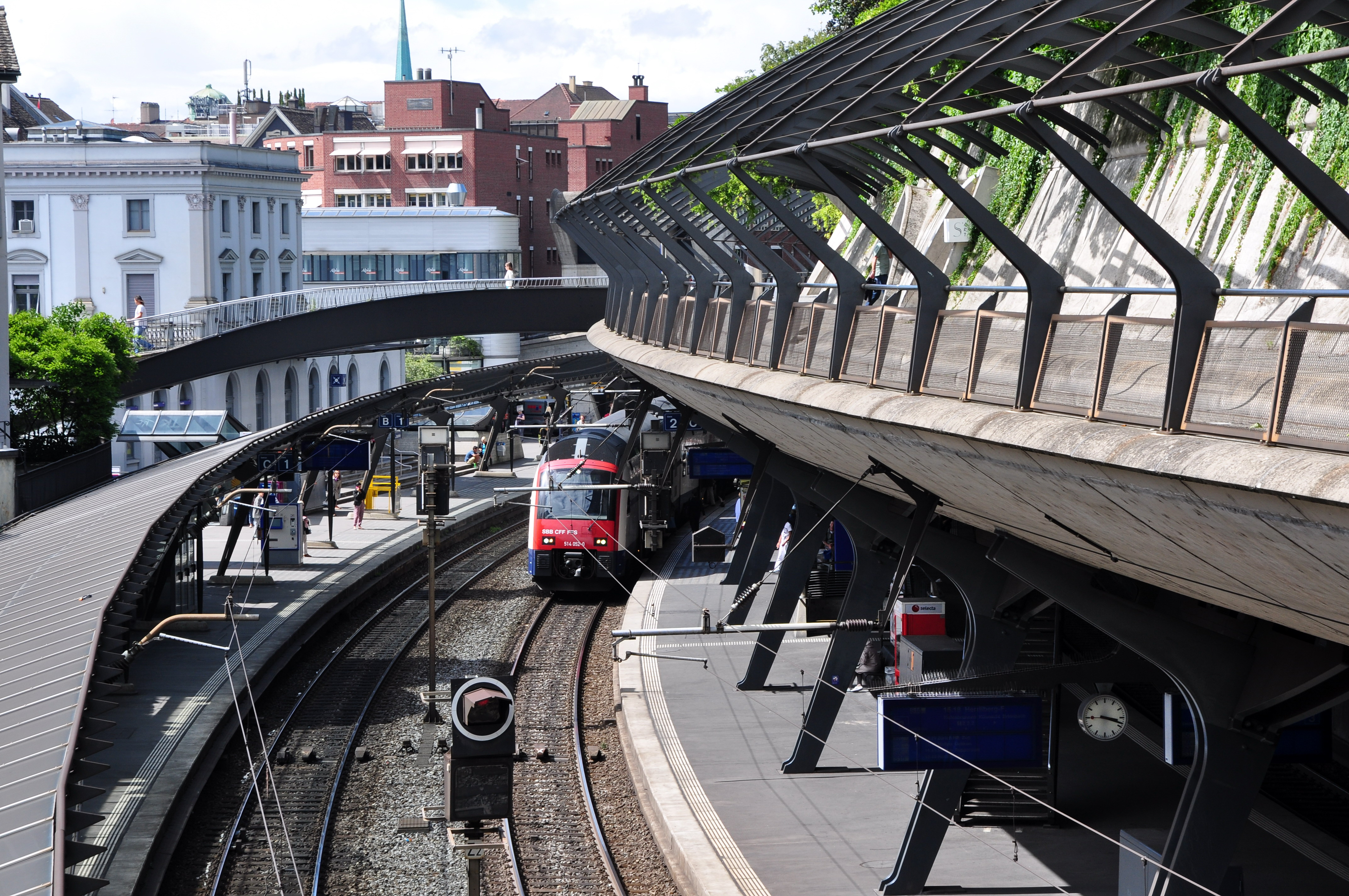
Zürich Stadelhofen railway station
