= District 11 =

District 11 can refer to:

- District 11 (Ho Chi Minh city), Vietnam
- District 11 (Zürich), Switzerland
- District 11, an electoral district of Malta
- Colorado Springs School District 11, in Colorado Springs, Colorado, United States
- District 11 (Hunger Games), fictional district in the Hunger Games books and films

== See also ==
- 11th arrondissement (disambiguation)
- District 10 (disambiguation)
- District 12 (disambiguation)
