= 10th arrondissement =

10th arrondissement may refer to:

- 10th arrondissement of Paris
- 10th arrondissement of Marseille
- 10th arrondissement of the Littoral Department, Benin
