= District 5 =

District 5, 5 District or 5th District may refer to:

== Europe ==
- District 5 (Zürich)
- District 5, Düsseldorf
- V District, Turku
- District 5, an electoral district of Malta
- District 5, a police district of Malta
- Palma-Palmilla, also known as District 5, a district of Málaga, Spain

== Asia ==
=== Japan (East Asia) ===
- Aichi 5th district
- Hokkaido 5th district
- Kyoto 5th district
- Gunma 5th district

=== Southeast Asia ===
- District 5, Ho Chi Minh City
- 5th District of Manila

== Middle East ==
- Kuwait's Fifth District

== Oceania ==
- 5th Military District (Australia)

== North America ==
=== United States ===
- 5th Military District
- 5th Naval District
- Lexington & Richland County School District Five
- Egyptian Community Unit School District 5
- School District 5 Southeast Kootenay

==== Judicial districts ====
- 5th District Appellate Court
- Florida Fifth District Court of Appeal

==== US local districts ====
- Los Angeles City Council District 5

==== US federal congressional districts ====
- Alabama's 5th congressional district
- Arkansas's 5th congressional district
- Arizona's 5th congressional district
- California's 5th congressional district
- Colorado's 5th congressional district
- Connecticut's 5th congressional district
- Florida's 5th congressional district
- Georgia's 5th congressional district
- Illinois's 5th congressional district
- Indiana's 5th congressional district
- Iowa's 5th congressional district
- Kansas's 5th congressional district
- Kentucky's 5th congressional district
- Louisiana's 5th congressional district
- Maine's 5th congressional district
- Maryland's 5th congressional district
- Massachusetts's 5th congressional district
- Michigan's 5th congressional district
- Minnesota's 5th congressional district
- Mississippi's 5th congressional district
- Missouri's 5th congressional district
- Nebraska's 5th congressional district
- New Jersey's 5th congressional district
- New York's 5th congressional district
- North Carolina's 5th congressional district
- Ohio's 5th congressional district
- Oklahoma's 5th congressional district
- Oregon's 5th congressional district
- Pennsylvania's 5th congressional district
- South Carolina's 5th congressional district
- Tennessee's 5th congressional district
- Texas's 5th congressional district
- Vermont's 5th congressional district
- Virginia's 5th congressional district
- Washington's 5th congressional district
- West Virginia's 5th congressional district
- Wisconsin's 5th congressional district

==== US state senates ====
- California's 5th State Senate district
- Pennsylvania Senate, District 5
- Texas Senate, District 5
- 5th Utah Senate District
- Wisconsin Senate, District 5

==== US state houses ====
- California's 5th State Assembly district
- Connecticut's 5th assembly district
- New Hampshire's 5th State Senate District
- Pennsylvania House of Representatives, District 5

== Fiction ==
- District 5 (Hunger Games), fictional district in the Hunger Games books and films
- The original name for the protagonist hockey team in The Mighty Ducks

== See also ==
- Sector 5 (Bucharest)
- District 4 (disambiguation)
- District 6 (disambiguation)
