= Area 7 =

Area 7 may refer to:

- Area 7 (NTS) one of the areas inside the Nevada Test Site
- Area 7 (novel), thriller by Matthew Reilly
- Area-7, Australian band
- Brodmann area 7

== See also ==
- District 7 (disambiguation)
- Sector 7 (disambiguation)
