= District 6 =

District Six is a place in Cape Town, South Africa.

District Six may also refer to:

== Government divisions ==
- District 6, Ho Chi Minh City, Vietnam
- District 6 (New York City Council), in the United States
- VI District, Turku, in Finland
- District 6 (Zürich), in Switzerland
- District 6 (Düsseldorf), a district of Düsseldorf, Germany
- District 6, an electoral district of Malta
- Districts 6 and 6A, police districts of Malta

== Schools ==
- District 6 Schoolhouse, a historic school in East Providence, Rhode Island, United States
- Little Red Schoolhouse (Brunswick, New York), also known as District 6 Schoolhouse, in Brunswick, New York, United States

== Other uses ==
- District Six: The Musical, a musical set in District Six, South Africa
- District Six (album), an album by Amphibious Assault
- District 6 (Hunger Games), fictional district in the Hunger Games books and films
- Zonnebloem, a suburb of Cape Town, South Africa that was renamed to District Six in December 2019

== See also ==
- Sector 6 (Bucharest)
- District 5 (disambiguation)
- District 7 (disambiguation)
- District 9, a 2009 film with elements inspired by events that occurred in District Six, Cape Town.
