= Sheep Piece 1971–72 =

Sculpture series by Henry Moore

Sheep Piece
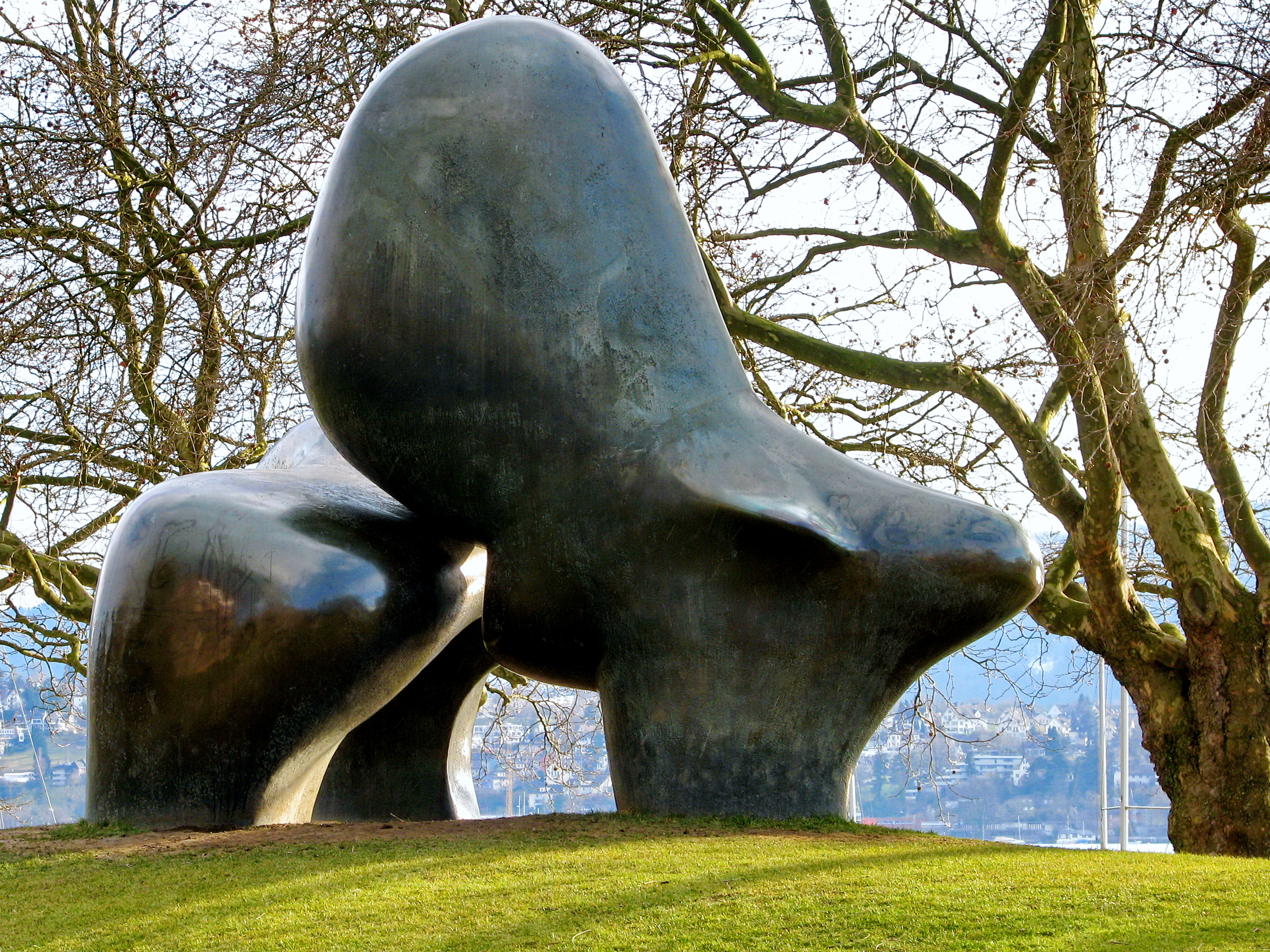
- at Riesbach harbour, Zürich-Seefeld, 2014
- Artist: Henry Moore
- Year: 1969 to 1972
- Medium: Bronze
- Dimensions: 579 cm (228 in)

Sheep Piece is a bronze sculpture by Henry Moore made in three sizes from 1969-1972, starting in 1969 with a 14 centimetres (5.5 in) maquette (LH 625) modelled in plaster and then cast in bronze, enlarged in 1971 to a 142 centimetres (56 in) working model (LH 626) in plaster and then cast in bronze, and finally a full size bronze (LH 627) on a monumental scale, 570 centimetres (220 in) high, cast in 1971-72. The four full-size casts are at the Henry Moore Foundation in Perry Green, Hertfordshire, in Zürich, in Kansas City, and at the Donald M. Kendall Sculpture Gardens in Purchase, New York.

== Background ==
Moore was inspired by seeing sheep in the fields outside his windows at Perry Green, Hertfordshire. He made many sketches of the animals, which he described as "rather shapeless balls of wool, with a head and four legs. Then I began to realise that underneath all that wool was a body, which moved in its own way, and that each sheep had its individual character."

The sculpture includes two forms, representing two animals – possibly two adult sheep, or a ewe with a lamb. Moore later wrote "The sculpture is in two related forms. One is solid and passive, resting firmly on the ground and strongly resistant - the other form, slightly larger and more active and powerful, but yet it leans on the lower form, needing it for support." When Moore placed a cast of the sculpture in a field in Hertfordshire, he was pleased to see sheep sheltering under it or scratching themselves on it.

In the book Makers of Modern Culture, Patrick Conner describes the "power" of Sheep Piece as not only lying in the "physical confirmation of two massive structures but also in the psychological overtones of warmth and protectiveness that their relationship suggests".

== History ==
The work began as a 14 centimetres (5.5 in) maquette made in plaster in 1969, and then cast in bronze. An example of the bronze is exhibited by the Henry Moore Foundation in Perry Green.

The maquette was enlarged to a 142 centimetres (56 in) plaster working model in 1971, which was then cast in bronze in an edition of 7+1 (seven casts plus an artist's copy). The plaster model is Perry Green, and examples of the bronze casts are at the Fine Arts Museums of San Francisco and the Hakone Open-Air Museum.

The work was enlarged again in 1971-72 to create a full size bronze on a monumental scale, 570 centimetres (220 in) high, in edition of 3+1. A cast was loaned for the public exhibition in Battersea Park for Elizabeth II's Silver Jubilee in 1977, and a cast was included in an exhibition organised by the Musée de l'Orangerie in Paris, and displayed in the Tuileries the same year.

The artist's copy, cast 0, is at Perry Green.

Cast 2 is situated on the Seepromenade in the Seefeld district of Zürich. The sculpture has stood on the promenade since 1976, when it was sited as part of an exhibition of Moore's work.

Another cast has been in the Donald J. Hall Sculpture Park in Kansas City since 1976, in the grounds of the Nelson-Atkins Museum of Art. The purchase of the sculpture by the city was controversial, and it was bought using a legacy from N. Clyde Degginger intended for a monument to capture something of the unique "pioneer spirit" of Kansas. It has been described as being pastoral, resembling bison but abstracted like boulders.

The third commercial cast was exhibited at the Clarks shoe factory in Street, Somerset from 1979 until it was sold to PepsiCo in 1991, for a price reported to be around £2.1 million. It is now included in the Donald M. Kendall Sculpture Gardens in New York.

== See also ==
- List of sculptures by Henry Moore
