= Fountain Park =

Fountain Park may refer to:

- Fountain Park, Indiana
- Fountain Park, Michigan
- Fountain Park, Ohio
- Fountain Park, St. Louis
