= Sector 78, Noida =

- City Area
- National Capital Region Territory
- Location within Uttar Pradesh
- Coordinates: 28.5614°N 77.3847°E
- Country: India
- Region: North India
- State: Uttar Pradesh
- City: Noida

Government
  - Body: Government of Uttar Pradesh
- Elevation: 200 m (660 ft)

Languages
  - Official: Hindi, English
- Time zone: UTC+5:30 (IST)
- PIN: 201306
- Area code: 0120
- Vehicle registration: UP-16

Sector 78, is a location close to the centre of Noida city in India. It is dominated by residential areas, interspersed by commercial areas in between. The landmark and spectacular Vedvan Park, a theme park with a laser and light and sound show, dedicated to Indian culture attracts tourists and people from far and near. Sector 78, Noida is a part of National Capital Region of India.

== Geography ==
The sector is located in Gautam Buddh Nagar district of Uttar Pradesh state India. It is about 20 kms. southeast of New Delhi, 24 kilometres (15 mi) northwest of the district headquarters, Greater Noida and 455 kilometres (283 mi) northwest of the state capital, Lucknow, 18 km from Connaught Place of New Delhi. It is bound on the west and south-west by the Yamuna River, on the north and north-west by the city of Delhi, on the north-east by the cities of Delhi and Ghaziabad, India and on the north-east, east and south-east by the Hindon River. Sector 78 falls under the catchment area of the Yamuna river and is located on land, adjoining the old river bed. It is famous for its modern and swish lifestyle.

== Education ==
Sector 78 houses The Manthan School, adjoining Mahagun Moderne Housing Society, and several tutorial institutes namely Unloq Minds Tutorials (Antriksh Golf View 2 Mart), Wisdom Cubes (Sunshine Helios), S.F.A.T Coaching (Sikka Kaima Galleria) and more.

== Economy ==
The sector houses two malls and several marts, viz. Mahagun Mart, Hyde Park Crowne, upcoming Windsor Court Shopping Mart, Antriksh Golf View 2 Shopping Mart, Sunshine Helios Shopping Mart, Sikka Kaima Galleria and Aditya Urban Casa Shopping Mart, in addition to in-premises shops in Antriksh Golf View 1. It houses branches of leading Indian banks like Axis Bank, HDFC Bank, ICICI Bank, IndusInd Bank, Kotak Bank, Yes Bank and more.

== Transport ==
Sector 78 has good road connectivity. The Aqua Line Metro, service connects Sector 52, Noida with Depot Station, Greater Noida. The sector is served by Sector 101 Metro Station. There are public buses connecting the sector with other sectors in Noida, in addition to on-hire three wheelers (auto rickshaws) and on-call cabs.

== See also ==
- Buddh International Circuit
- Greater Noida
- Gurgaon
- Noida
- Uttar Pradesh
