= District 10 Schoolhouse =

Historic schoolhouse in New York State, USA

- District #10 Schoolhouse
- U.S. National Register of Historic Places
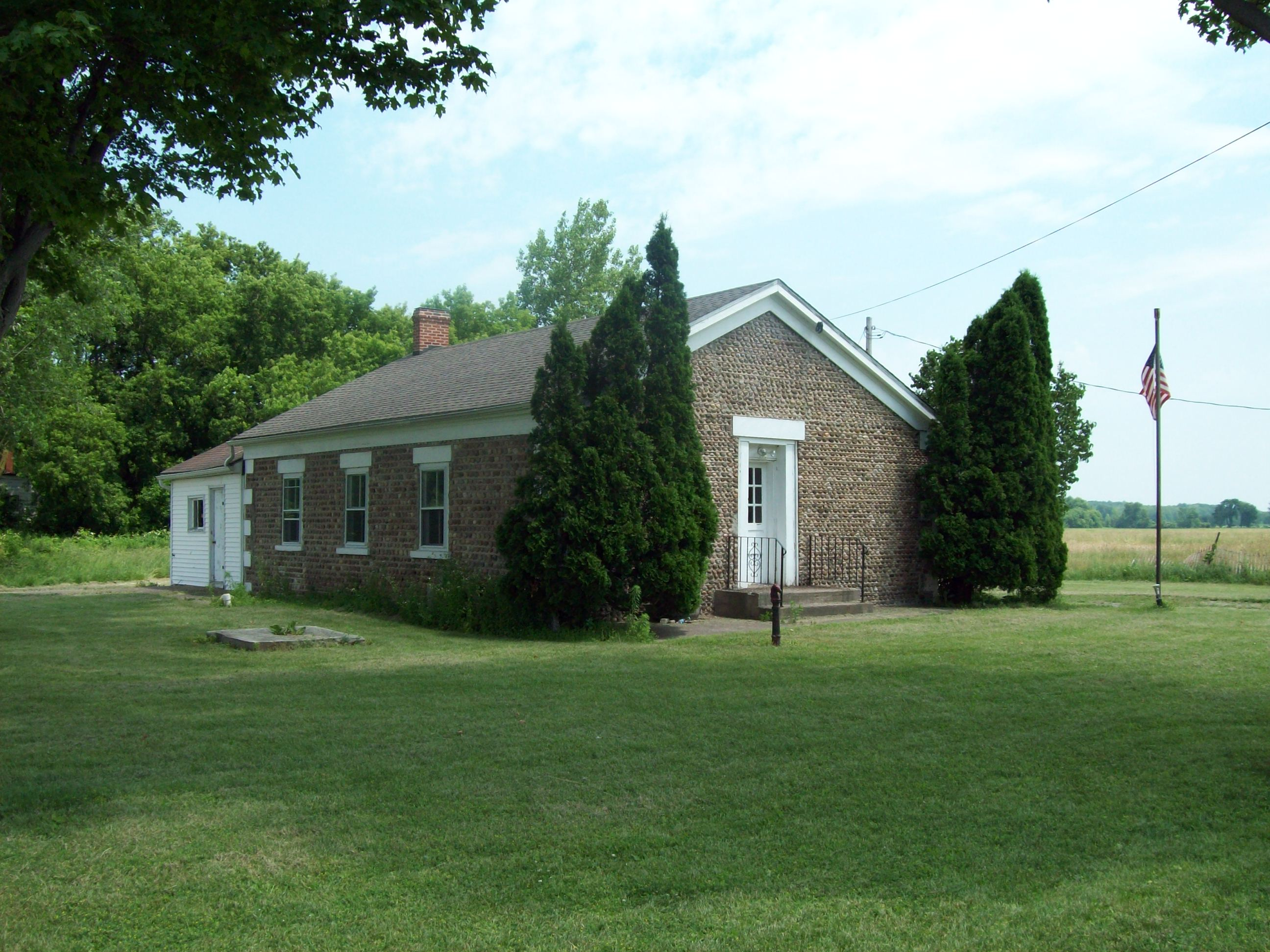
- District #10 Schoolhouse, June 2009

- Location within New York Location within the United States
- Location: 9713 Seaman Rd., Hartland, New York
- Coordinates: 43°16′53″N 78°29′20″W
- Built: 1845
- Architectural style: Greek Revival
- MPS: Cobblestone Architecture of New York State MPS
- NRHP reference No.: 00001467
- Added to NRHP: December 01, 2000

District #10 Schoolhouse is a historic One-room school located at Hartland in Niagara County, New York. It is a one-story cobblestone structure built about 1845 in the Greek Revival style. It features smooth, slight irregularly shaped, variously colored cobbles in its construction. It operated as a school until 1947 when it was converted into a private residence. It was recently acquired by the Hartland Historical Society. It is one of approximately 47 cobblestone structures in Niagara County.

It was listed on the National Register of Historic Places in 2000.
