= Sohana =

- Village
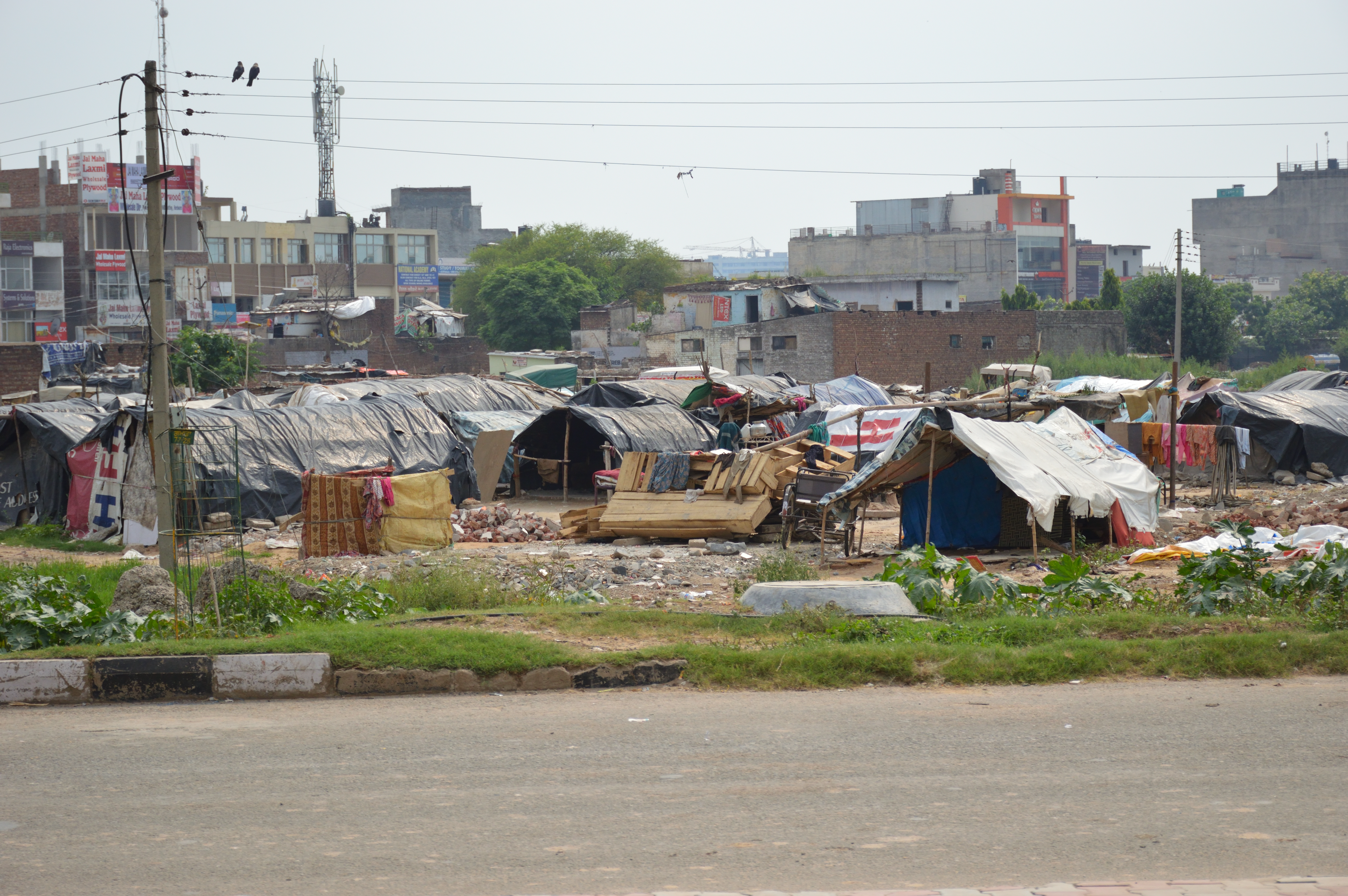
- Jhuggi - Sohana - Mohali

- Location in Punjab, India Sohana (India)
- Coordinates: 30°41′N 76°42′E
- Country: India
- State: Punjab
- District: Sahibzada Ajit Singh Nagar

Population
  - Total: 20,000

Languages
  - Official: Punjabi
- Time zone: UTC+5:30 (IST)
- PIN: 140308
- Telephone code: 0172
- Vehicle registration: PB-65
- Nearest city: Mohali
- Literacy: 75%
- Vidhan Sabha constituency: Kharar

Sohana is a hamlet under Mohali, Punjab. It has a population of approximately 20,000. It is situated near Sector 70, Mohali.

== Neighbouring Areas/Cities ==
- Chandigarh
- Kharar
- Homeland Heights
- Saikspur
- Sohana Hospital

== Controversies ==
=== Customs & Traditions ===
Sohana has been the subject of controversy over a distinctive and macabre Holi tradition involving animal remains. Traditionally, on the eve of Holi, animal carcasses, bones and skulls were hung outside houses and shops or scattered across the village streets. Participants also played Holi by throwing ash, including ash reportedly collected from cremation grounds, and, in some accounts, mud, cow dung and sewage water. Local explanations for the custom vary, with some residents associating it with warding off evil spirits or misfortune, while others trace it to a time when villagers could not afford coloured powders. The practice drew opposition on grounds of hygiene and public order, and police intervened in 2008 to persuade residents to discontinue it. Although it subsequently declined, reports indicate that the tradition has periodically resurfaced and remains practiced by some residents.

=== 2026 Sacrilege Controversy ===
On May 5, 2026, torn pages (angs) of a Gutka Sahib were found scattered along an 800-meter stretch of Airport Road in Sohana, near Gurdwara Singh Shaheedan. The act sparked widespread outrage, leading local residents to block the main thoroughfare in protest. An FIR was filed against unidentified individuals and five investigation teams were formed, but no suspects were ultimately identified or arrested.

== Notable Celebrities ==
- Bhadant Anand Kausalyayan (1905–1988)
- Prince Narula (1990)
- Karam Singh Baidwan, holder of the Baidwan Estate (2000s). Besides the Baidwan Estate, Karam Singh owns 13.5% of the Sohana Village (Area-wise). Currently, Baidwan is Baidwan Confectionery's CEO. It creates the emblematic 'Milk Splash' chocolates. Baidwan had pledged ₹200 Cr. to the Sohana Project (Source of the ₹200 Cr. is contentious).
