= Housefed =

The Punjab State Federation of Cooperative House Building societies Ltd
- ਪੰਜਾਬ ਕੋਆਪ੍ਰੇਸ਼ਨ

Agency overview
- Formed: 1970
- Jurisdiction: Punjab
- Headquarters: Sector 34 A, Chandigarh
- Agency executive: Balwinder Singh Sidhu
- Website: http://punjabcooperation.gov.in/html/housefed.html

Housefed is the Punjab State Federation of Cooperative House Building societies whose aim is to tackle the problem of housing in the Punjab State. It was established in 17.11.1970 and comes under Department of Cooperation, Punjab. The cooperation grant loans, acquires n develop lands, acquire and alter or repair properties, construct societies. Housefed has built housing societies in Mohali, Bathinda, Ludhiana, SBS Nagar, Banur and Jalandhar.
