= District 13 Police Station =

- U.S. National Register of Historic Places
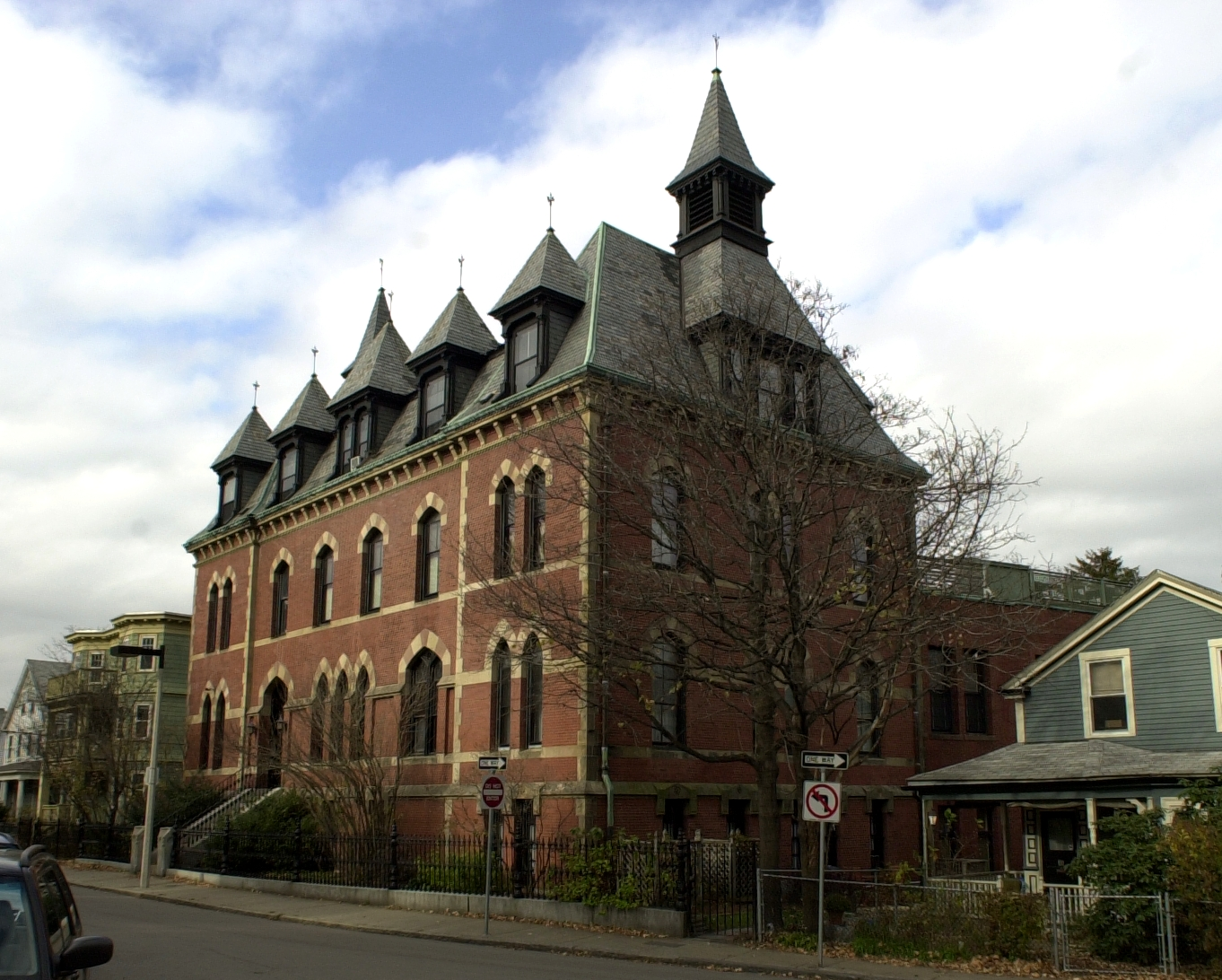

- Location within Massachusetts Location within the United States
- Location: 28 Seaverns Ave., Boston, Massachusetts
- Coordinates: 42°18′43.4″N 71°6′44.4″W
- Area: less than one acre
- Built: 1873
- Architect: Edmund M. Wheelwright; George Ropes
- Architectural style: Gothic, High Victorian Gothic
- NRHP reference No.: 87002549
- Added to NRHP: February 10, 1988

The District 13 Police Station is a historic former police station at 28 Seaverns Avenue in the Jamaica Plain neighborhood of Boston, Massachusetts. The Gothic Revival station was designed in 1873 by George Ropes and built for the town of West Roxbury, as one of its last public works before its annexation by Boston. An addition was designed in 1892 by Edmund M. Wheelwright, architect for the City of Boston. The building is one of the only high-style Victorian municipal buildings in the city.

The building was listed on the National Register of Historic Places in 1988. It has been converted to residential use.

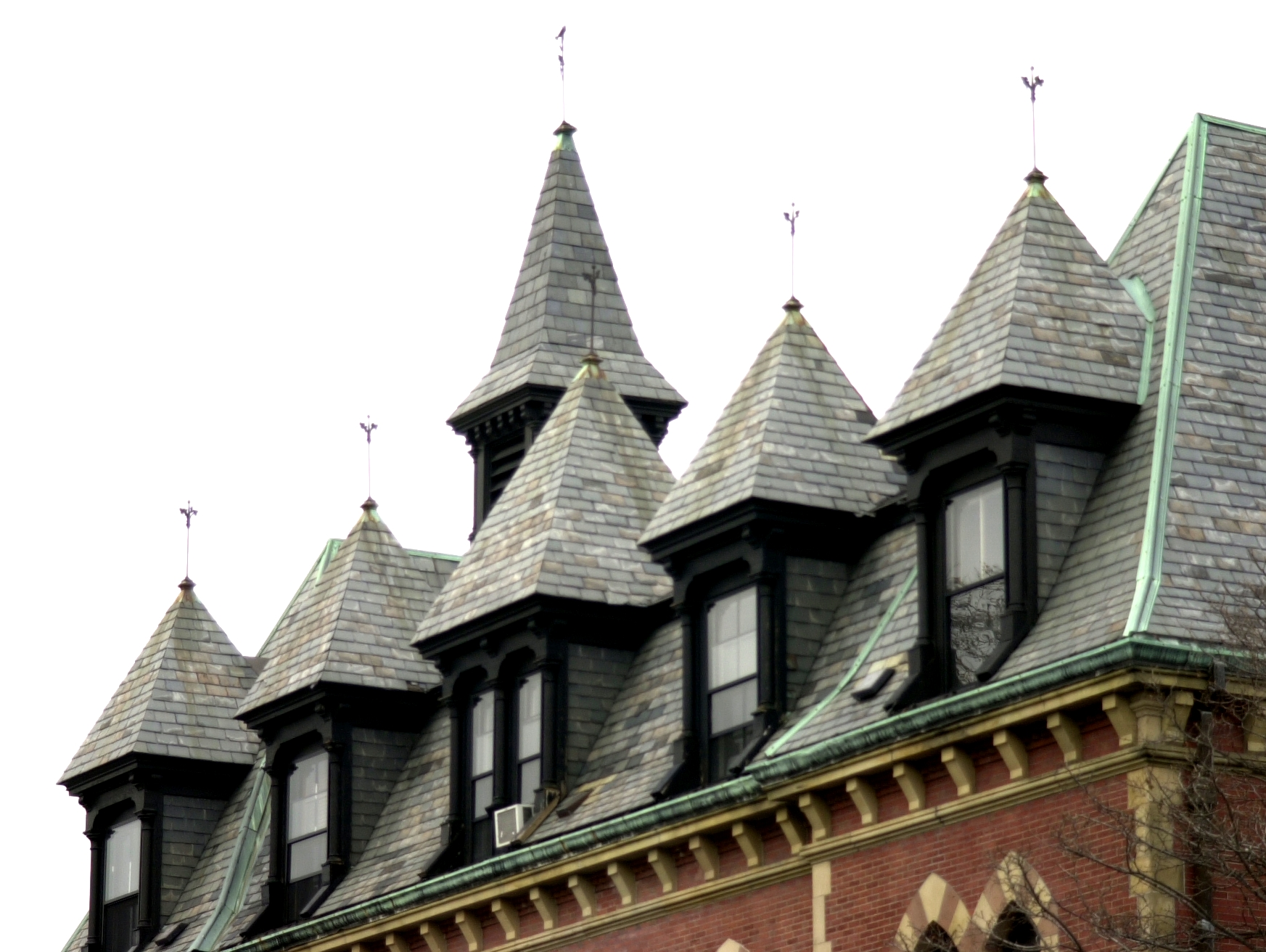

== See also ==
- National Register of Historic Places listings in southern Boston, Massachusetts
