= District 7 School (Groton, Massachusetts) =

- U.S. National Register of Historic Places
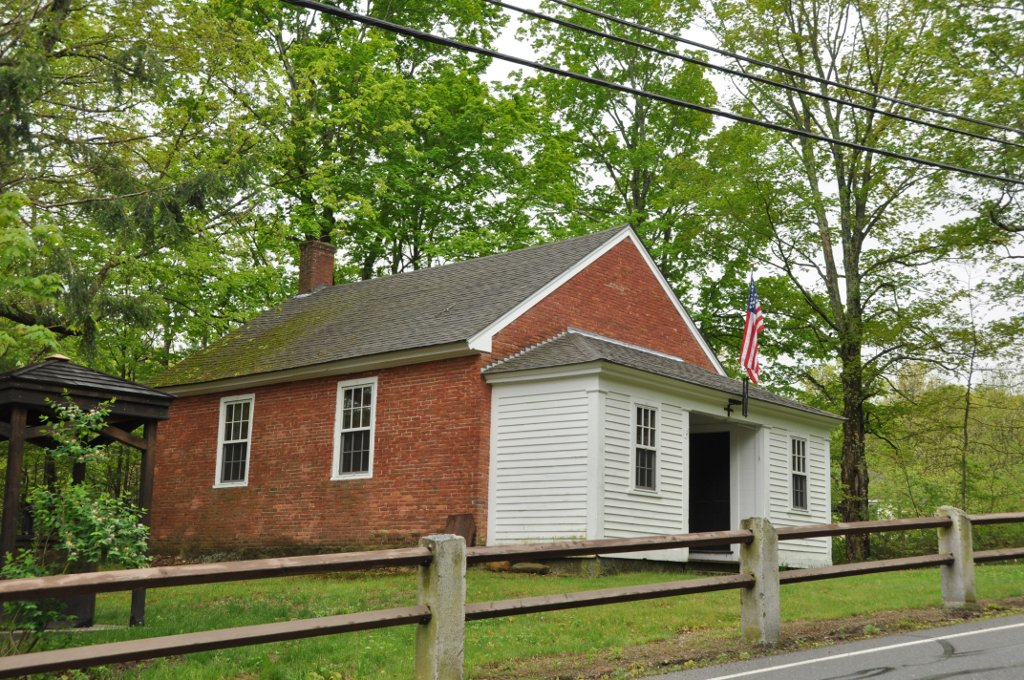

- Location within Massachusetts Location within the United States
- Location: Groton, Massachusetts
- Coordinates: 42°37′54″N 71°32′54″W
- Built: 1833
- NRHP reference No.: 07001487
- Added to NRHP: January 29, 2008

The District 7 School is a historic school building at 366 Chicopee Row in Groton, Massachusetts. The one-room single story brick building was built c. 1833, and is one of four surviving district schools (of which it is the best-preserved) in the town. The building has only very limited vernacular Federal styling, but has retained interior finish work from both the early and late 19th century. The property includes a 19th-century outhouse. The building served as a school until 1916, after which time it was taken over by a community non-profit for use as a community center.

The schoolhouse was listed on the National Register of Historic Places in 2008.

== See also ==
- National Register of Historic Places listings in Middlesex County, Massachusetts
