= District 7 School (Hanson, Massachusetts) =

- U.S. National Register of Historic Places
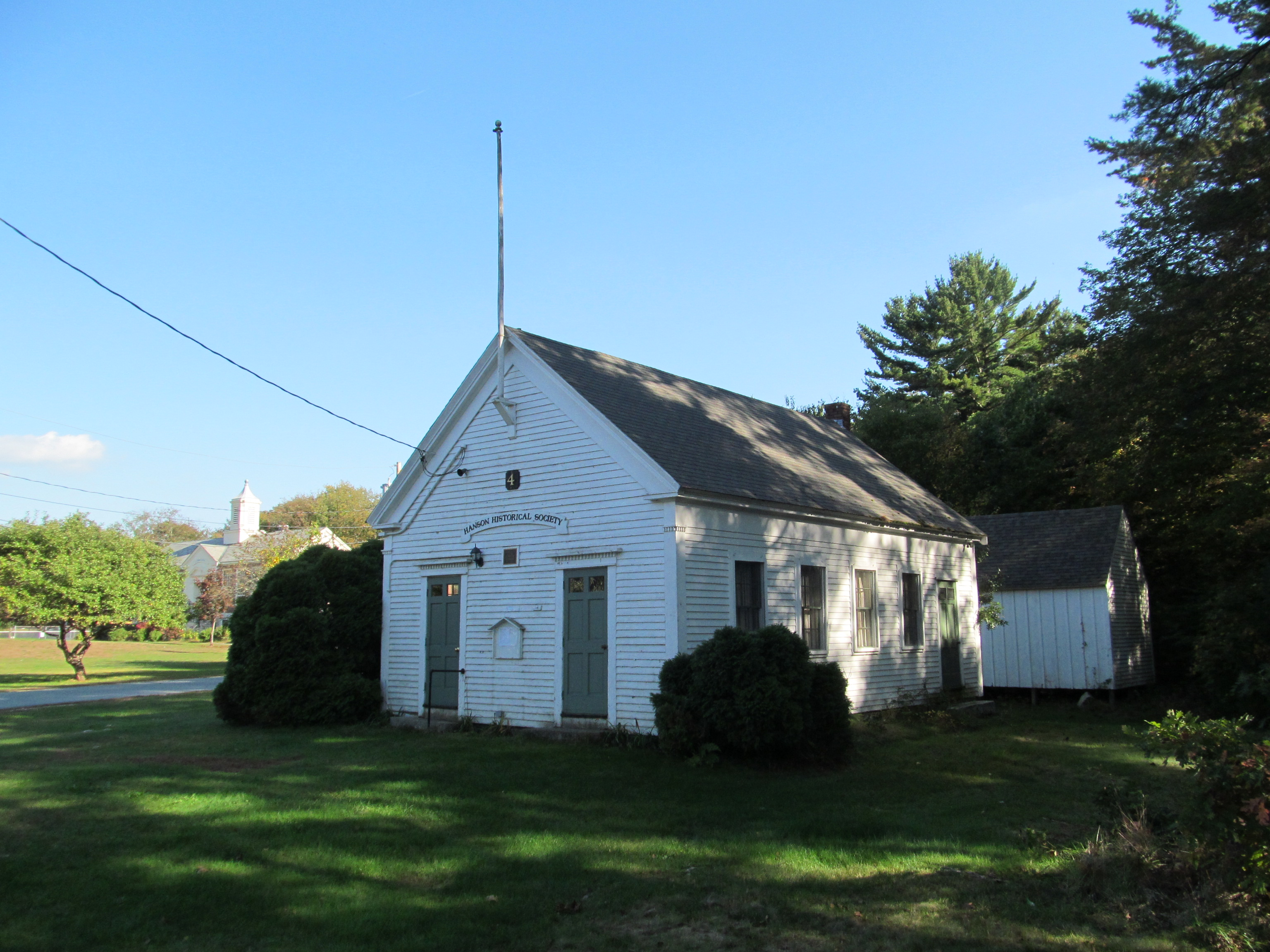
- School House #4

- Location within Massachusetts Location within the United States
- Location: Hanson, Massachusetts
- Coordinates: 42°2′25″N 70°51′46″W
- Built: 1845
- Architectural style: Greek Revival
- NRHP reference No.: 05000876
- Added to NRHP: August 11, 2005

The District 7 School is a historic one-room schoolhouse at 565 Main Street in Hanson, Massachusetts. The single-story wood-frame structure was built in 1845, and is the town's oldest surviving schoolhouse. It has two entry doors to anterooms which lead to the main schoolroom. The building was enlarged, apparently in 1882, when it was also moved across the street from its original location. It was moved again in 1939, to a position adjacent to the Thomas Elementary School, where it was used as a "portable" classroom. Finally, in 1963 it was moved to its present location, and has served since as a museum and meeting space operated by the local historical society.

The building was listed on the National Register of Historic Places in 2005.

== See also ==
- National Register of Historic Places listings in Plymouth County, Massachusetts
