= Littoral (Benin) =

Department of Benin

- Department
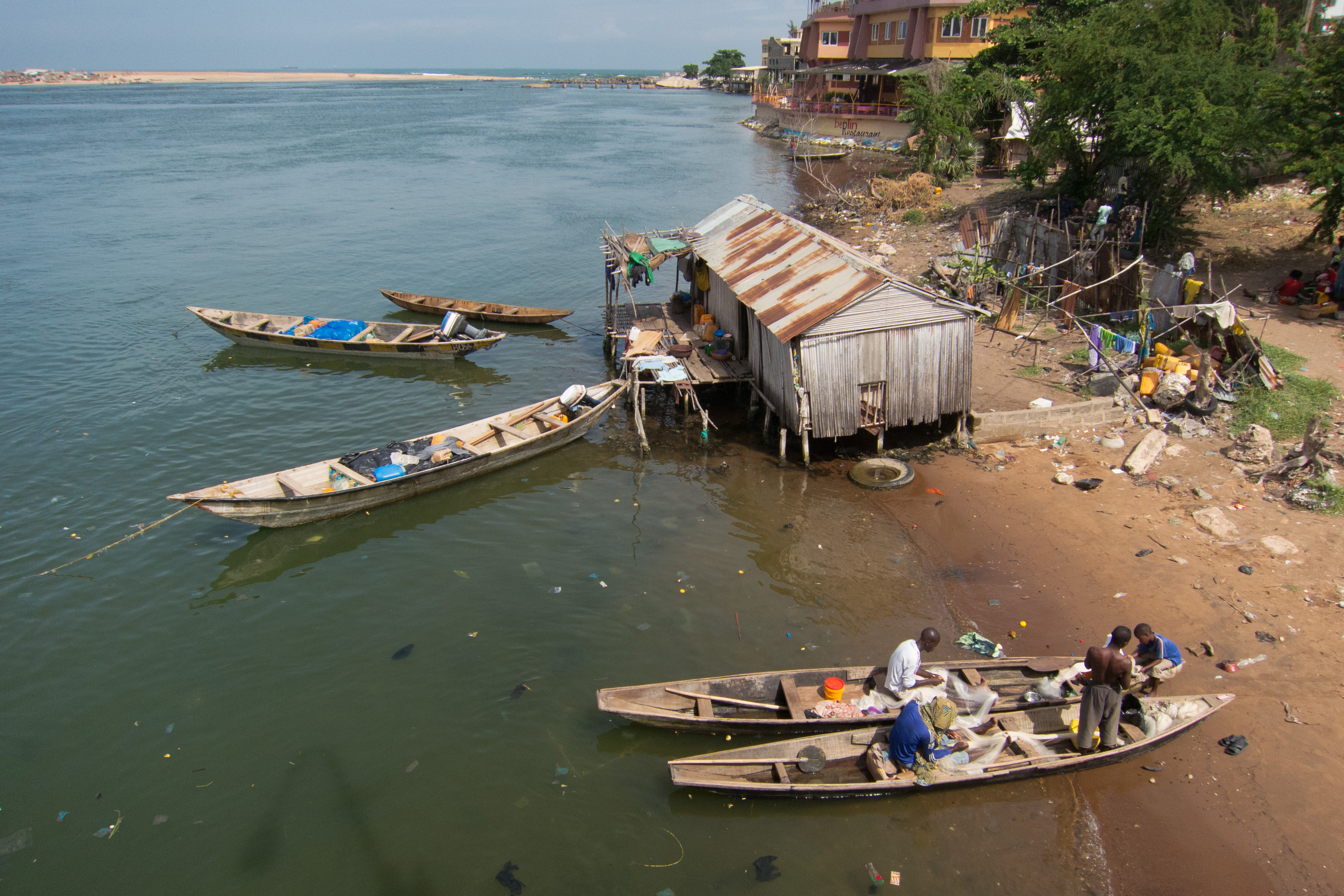
- Lagoon in Cotonou

- Map highlighting the Littoral Department
- Coordinates: 6°22′N 2°26′E
- Country: Benin
- Capital: Cotonou

Area
  - Total: 79 km^{2} (31 sq mi)

Population (2013 census)
  - Total: 679,012
  - Density: 8,600/km^{2} (22,000/sq mi)
- Time zone: UTC+1 (WAT)

Littoral ([li.tɔ.ʁal], "Littoral") is one of the twelve departments of Benin. At 79 km^{2} (31 sq mi), Littoral is the smallest department in the country. Its capital is Cotonou, Benin's largest city. The department was created in 1999 with the splitting up of territories of Atlantique Department.

As per 2013 census, the total population of the department was 679,012 with 325,872 males and 353,140 females. The entire population was urban while the total labour force in the department numbered 253,892. The proportion of households with no level of attained formal education was 21.1%, by far the lowest of any department in the country.

== Geography ==
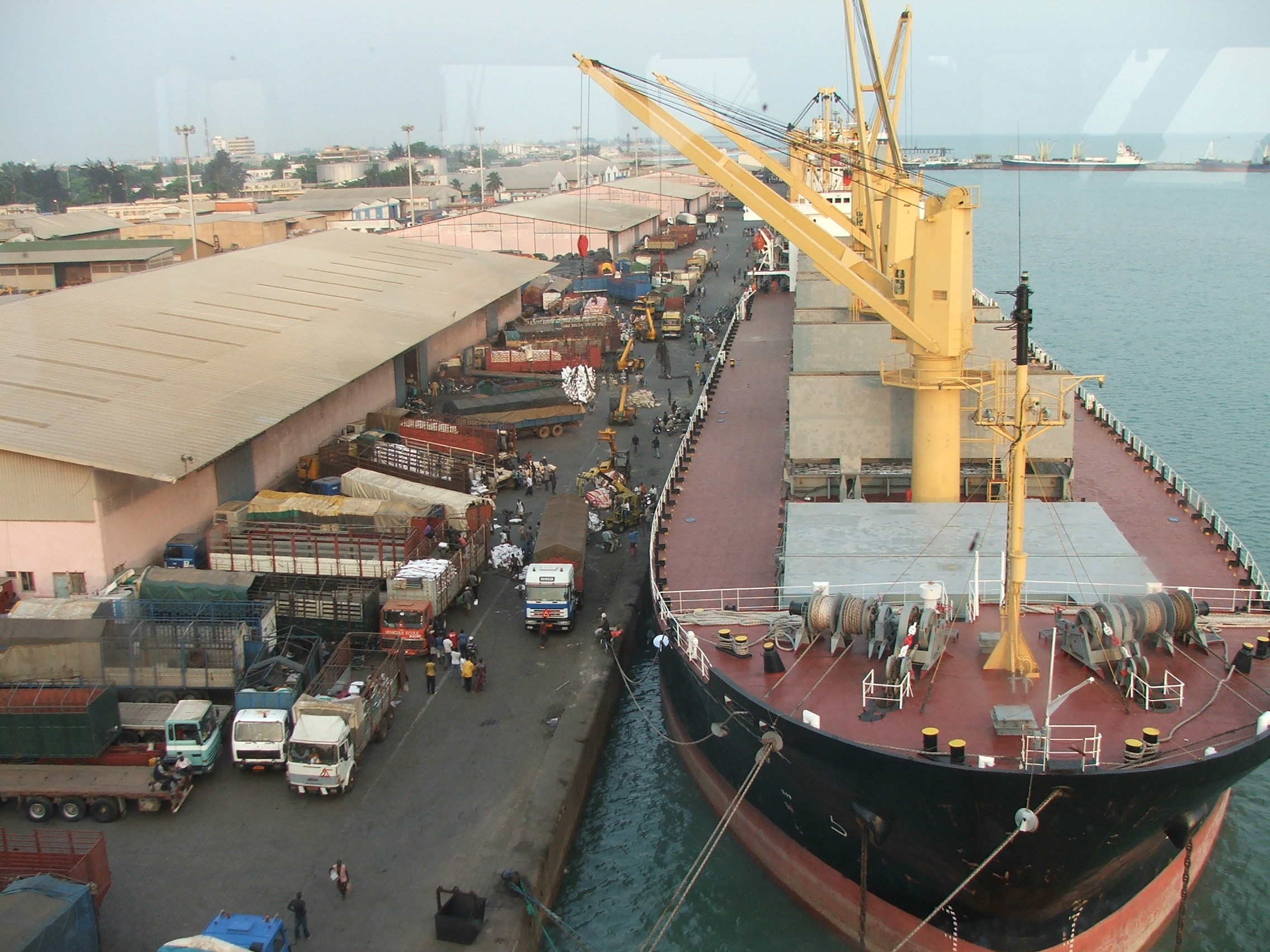
Cargo handling in the region

Littoral Department borders Ouémé Department and Atlantique Department and is situated in a coastal area that has interconnected lakes and lagoons and elongated coastlines with wide marshes. Freshwater and seawater fishing is the major profession in the region. Petroleum was discovered in the 1960s in offshore areas, while titanium, low-quality iron ore, ilmenite and chromite are the major minerals. The southern regions of Benin receive two spells from March to July and September to November while the northern regions of the country receive one season of rainfall from May to September. The country receives an average annual rainfall of around 1,200 mm (47 in), but Littoral Department receives less rainfall. The department's region has mostly low-lying sandy coastal plains towards the Atlantic Ocean, marshes, lagoons and lakes. The highest elevation in the department around the coastal plains is 20 m (66 ft) compared to the average 200 m (660 ft) above average mean sea level of the country.

== Demographics ==
Religious census
Religion	Percent(%)
Catholic	51.2%
Muslim	16.9%
Other Christian	12.2%
Celestial Church	5.7%
Methodist	3.7%
Other Protestant	2.1%
Vodoun	1.6%
Other Traditional	0.3%
Other	2.7%

According to Benin's 2013 census, the total population of Littoral Department was 679,012, with 325,872 males and 353,140 females. The proportion of women was 52.00%. The entire population lived in urban areas. The proportion of women of childbearing age (15 to 49 years old) was 28.00%. The total foreign population in the department was 57,516, representing 8.50% of the total population. The labour force participation rate among foreigners aged 15–64 years was 40.70%. The proportion of women among the foreign population constituted 48.90%. The number of households in the department was 166,433 and the average household size was 4.1. The intercensal growth rate of the population was 0.20%.

Among women, the average age of first marriage was 23.4 and the average age at first birth was 29. The synthetic index of fertility of women was 3.7. The average number of families per house was 1.1 and the average number of persons per room was 1.7. The total labour force in the department was 253,892, of which 46.00% were women. The proportion of households with no level of education was 21.10% and the proportion of households with children attending school was 88.50%. The crude birth rate was 33.6, the general rate of fertility was 120.10 and the gross reproduction rate was 1.80.

== Administrative divisions ==
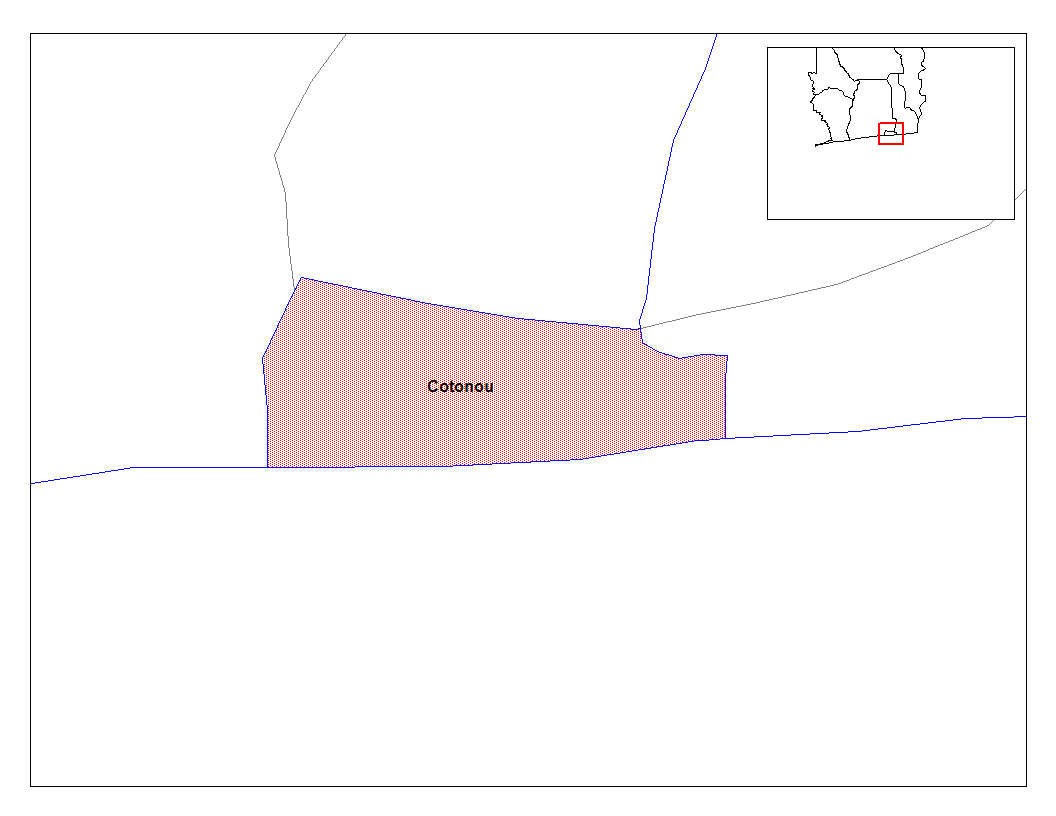
Communes of Littoral Department

The department of Littoral was created in 1999, when it was split off from Atlantique Department and Cotonou was made its capital. It is the smallest of all departments in the country. Littoral comprises just one commune/city, Cotonou, Benin's largest city and its economic capital. Cotonou is subdivided into 13 arrondissements, which are further subdivided into 165 neighborhoods.

Benin originally had six administrative regions (départements), which have now been bifurcated to make 12. Each of the deconcentrated administrative services (directions départementales) of the sectoral ministries takes care of two administrative regions. A law passed in 1999 transformed the sous-prefectures, the lowest level of territorial administration, into local governments. Municipalities and communal councils have elected representatives who manage the administration of the regions. The latest elections of the municipal and communal councils were held in June 2015.
