= Grün Stadt Zürich =

Coordinates: 47.4106515°N 9.3034687°E

- Company type: Municipal Department
- Founded: Zurich, Switzerland (1858)
- Products: Planning; Construction and Maintenance of Parks, Green spaces and Open spaces; Landscape Development; Nature Preservation; Garden Allotment and Agricultural Property Leasing; Farming; Forestry; Nursery; Environmental Education
- Number of employees: 500
- Website: www.stadt-zuerich.ch/gsz

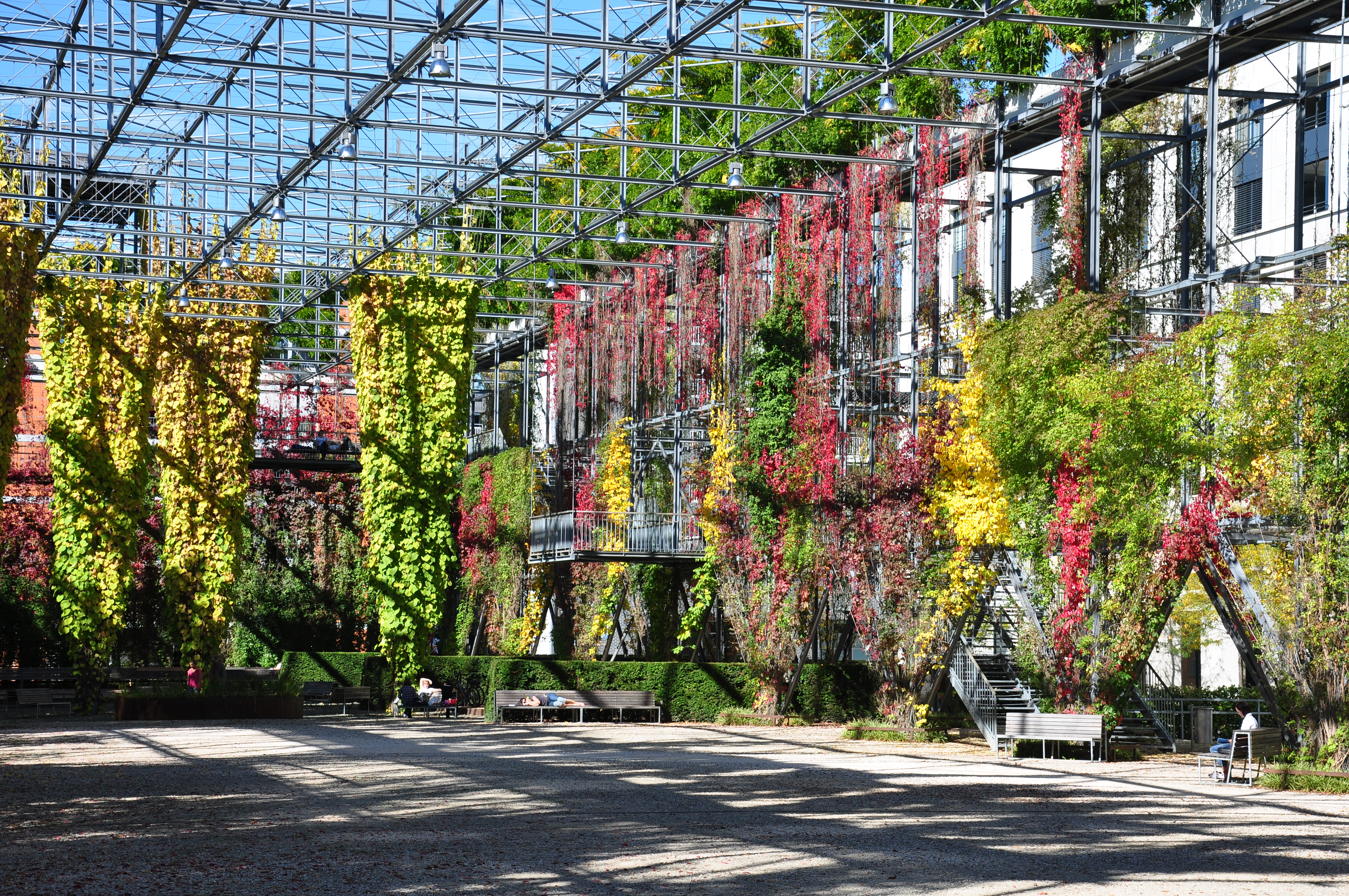
The award-winning MFO-Park in Oerlikon district

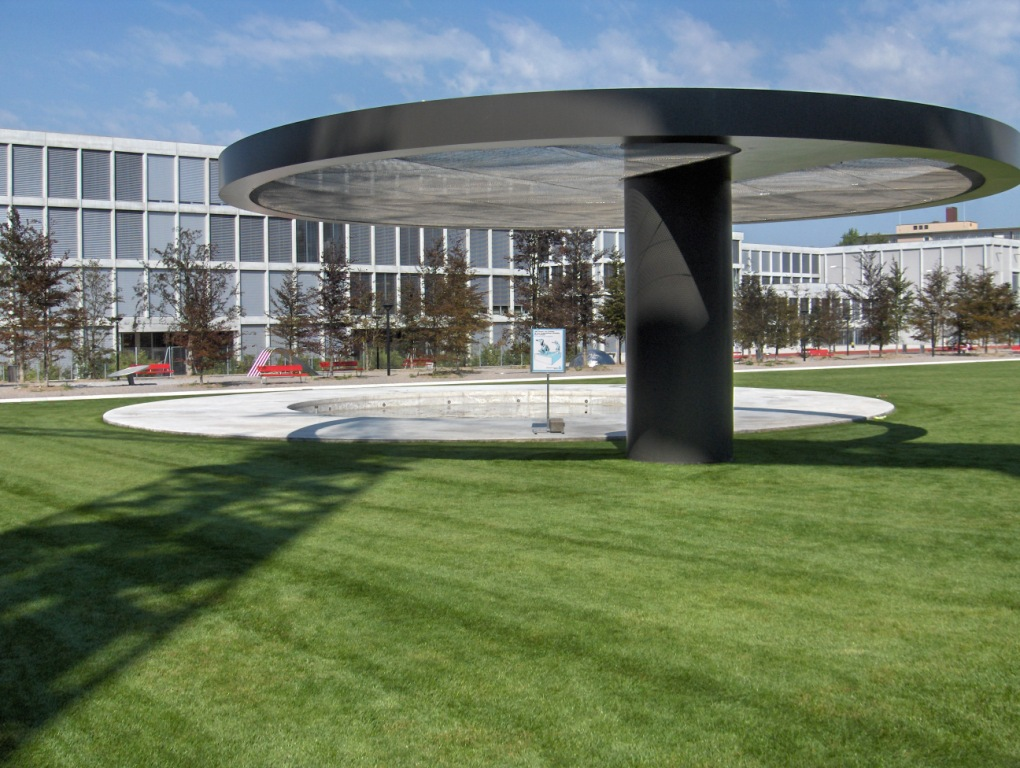
Wahlenpark in northern Zurich

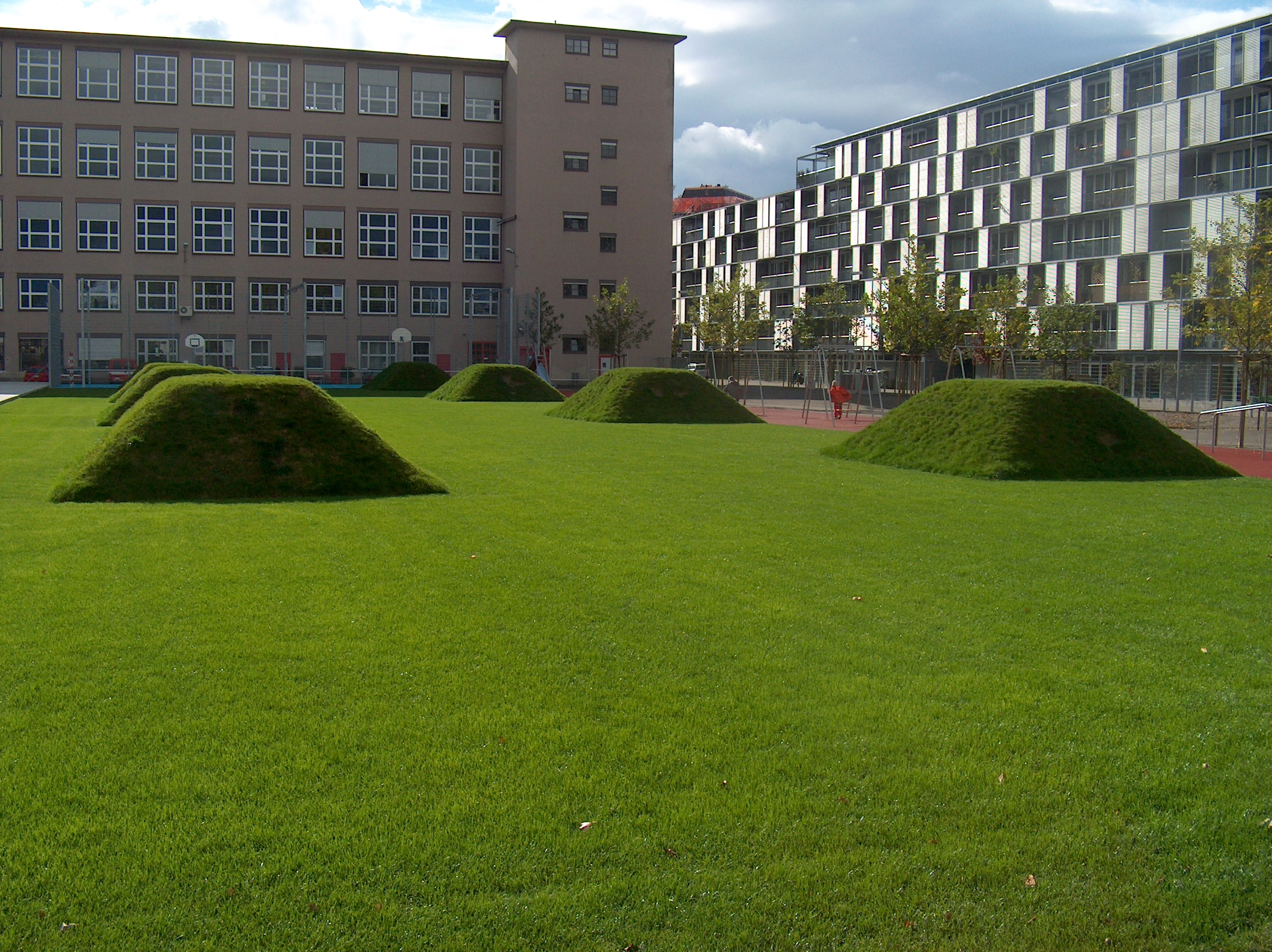
Louis-Häfliger-Park in Oerlikon district

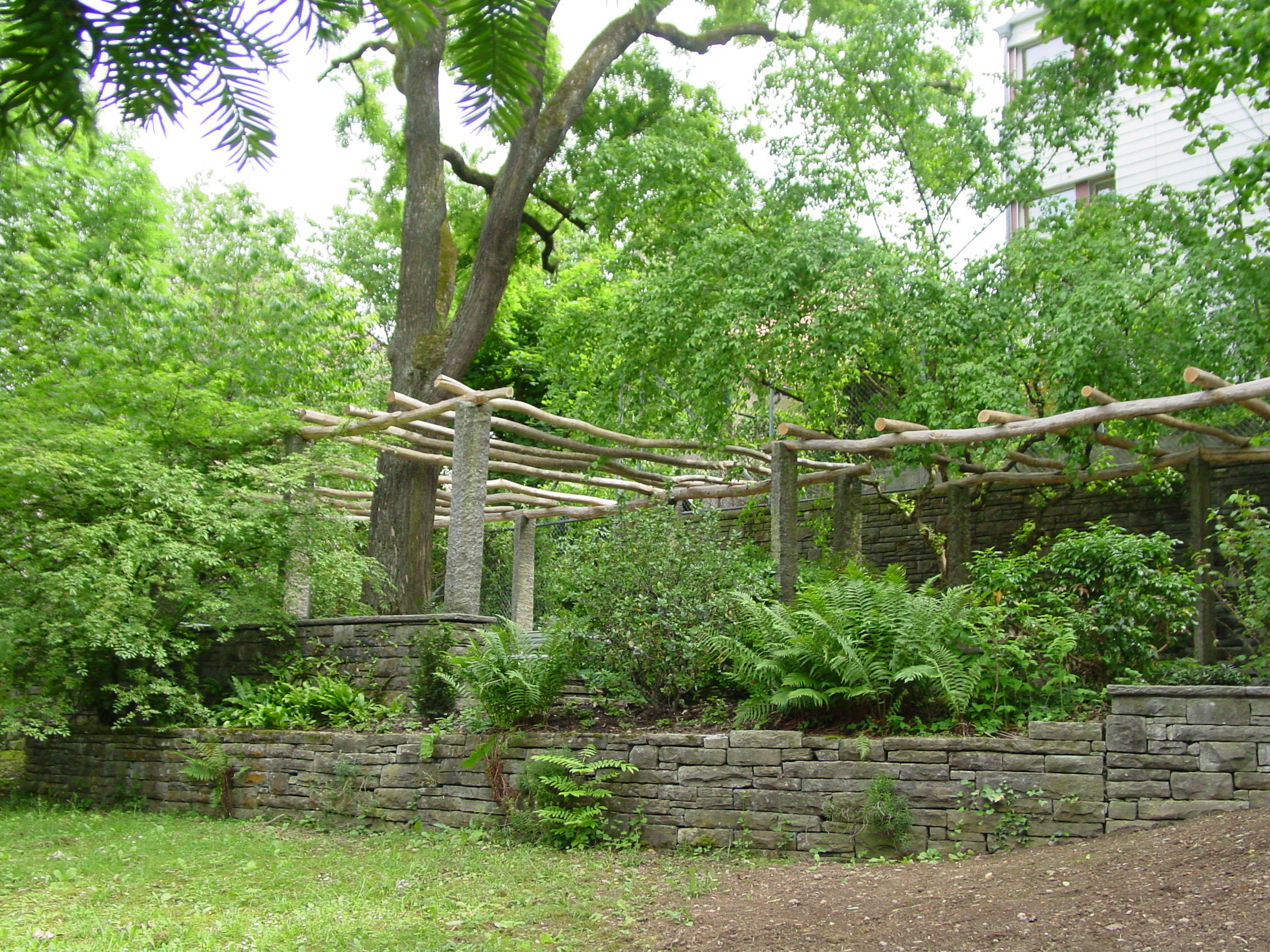
Mediterranean atmosphere at Gustav-Ammann-Park

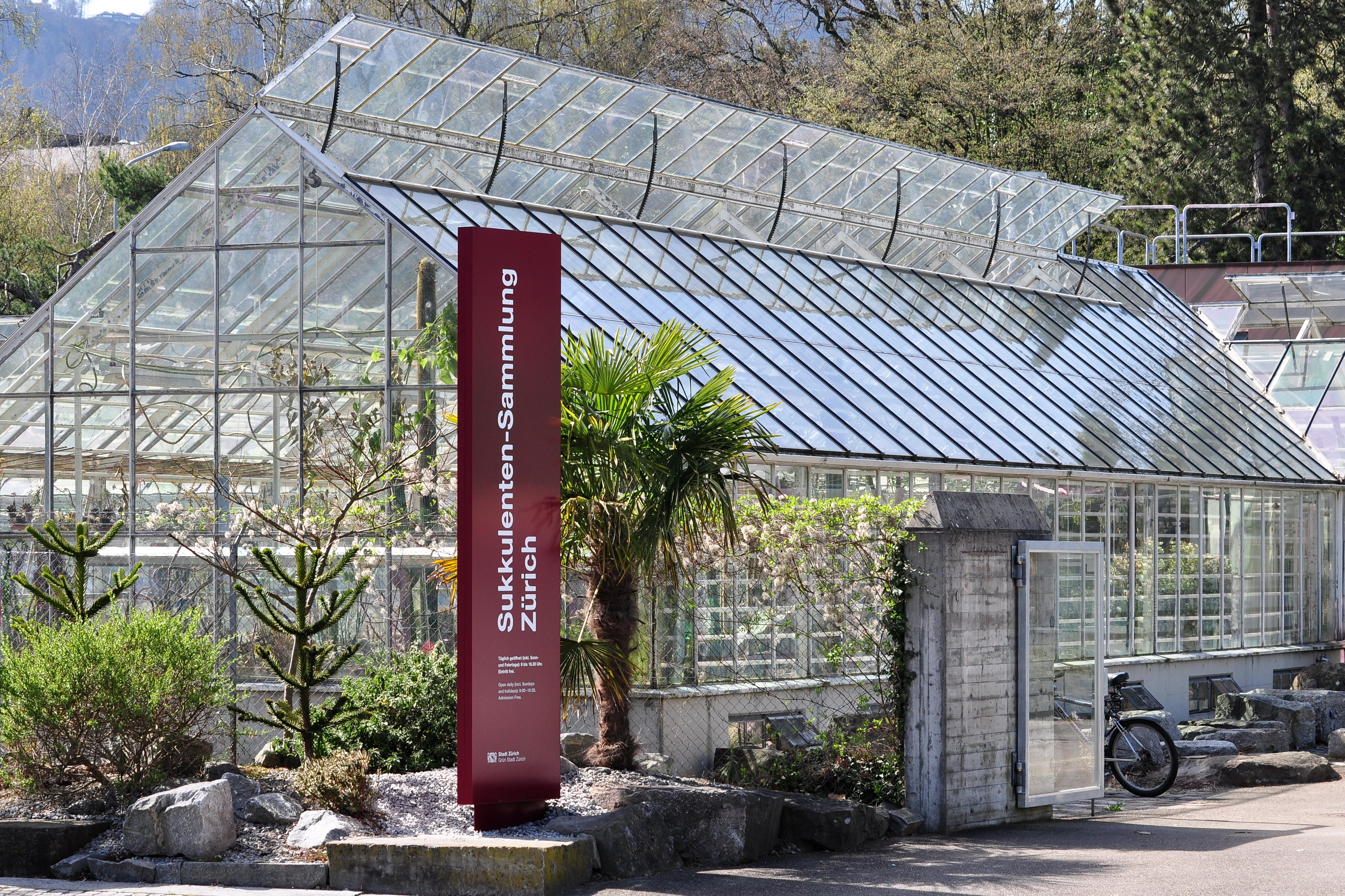
Sukkulentensammlung (Succulent Plant Collection) near shore of Lake Zurich near Wollishofen

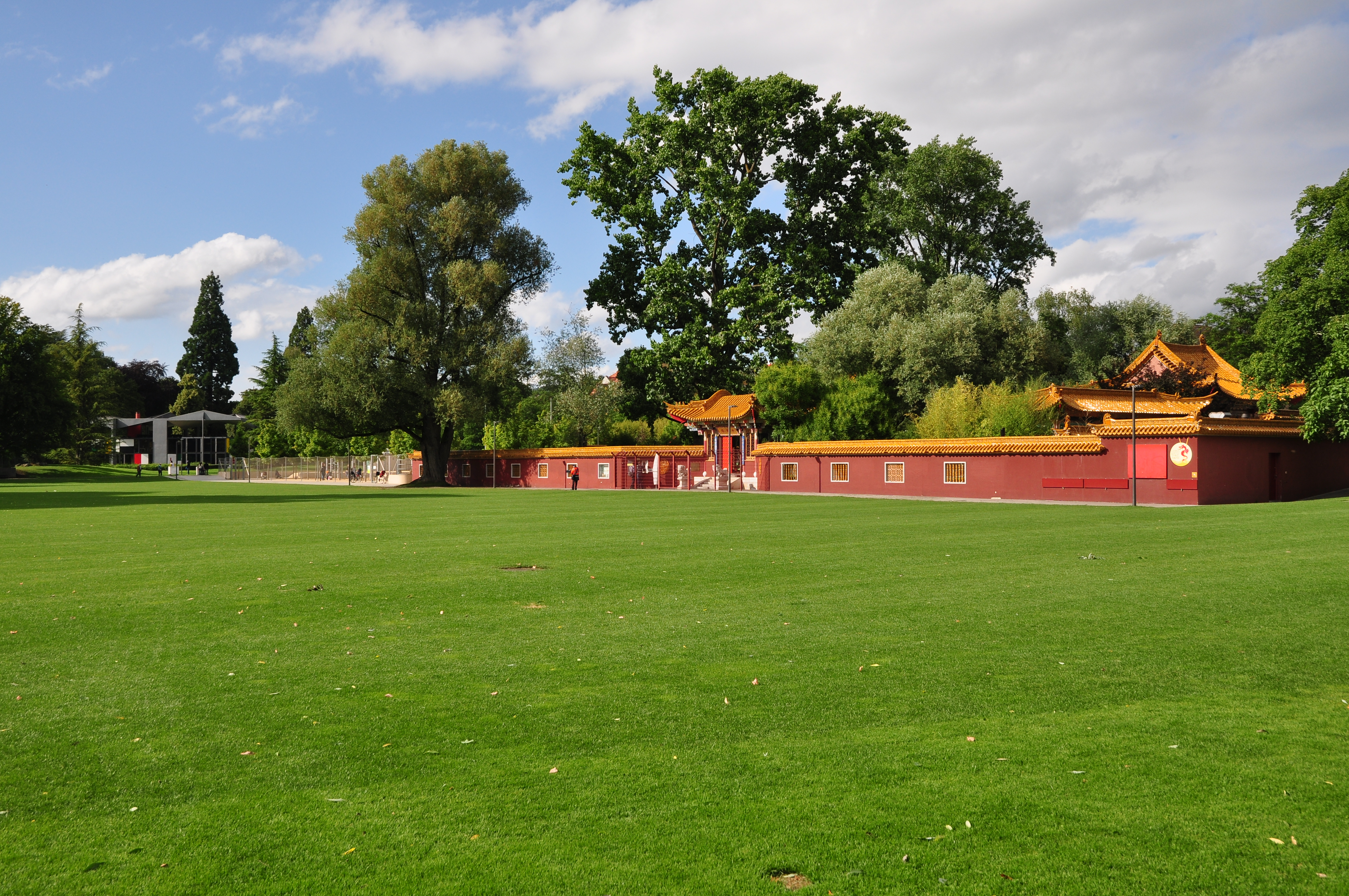
Blatterwiese and Chinagarten at Zürichhorn in the Seefeld district, Centre Le Corbusier in the background to the left

Grün Stadt Zürich (lit. "Green City Zurich"), commonly shortened to GSZ, the Office of Parks and Open Spaces, is a division of the Civil Engineering and Waste Management Department of Swiss city of Zurich. The GSZ is responsible for creating, preserving and maintaining the city's park system, sports facilities, urban forests, cemeteries, public swimming pools and playgrounds. Ten farms, nine of which are leased out, several nature schools, the local plant nursery, the Succulent Plant Collection and the Chinagarten are also operated, as well as the Quaianlagen promenades along the shore of Lake Zurich.

== Scope of activities ==
The department includes five divisions: Operations, Services, Promotion of Nature, Planning/Construction and Maintenance.

=== Operations ===
The Operations Division includes the nine municipal farms which are leased out and the agricultural estate "Juchhof". The "Juchhof" meets the requirements of the Swiss Ecologic Performance Record (ökologischer Leistungsnachweis ÖLN). The city forest, which covers an area of about 3,000 acres, is managed sustainably by the "Waldrevier Uetliberg" and "Waldrevier Nord". The municipal plant nursery, which organizes various courses and events on all aspects of ‘Green Knowledge,’ belongs to this division too, as well as the lease of roughly 6,000 garden allotments. The subdivision "Workshop and Logistics", which includes wood working, painting and mechanical workshops, is responsible for material acquisition, the vehicle fleet and repairs.

=== Services ===
The Services Division provides commercial supporting benefits. It coordinates the economic processes, especially in Human Resources, Finances, Systems Management (Informatics and Geographic Information Systems GIS) and Legal departments. The Services Division's activities are apparent at the job market, as the results of regular user surveys that generate an impact balance sheet, on annual and financial reports and through quality management.

=== Promotion of Nature ===
The Promotion of Nature Division advocates for the preservation and conservation of valuable plant and animal habitats. Its goal is to awaken the joy of nature and to show the value of a manifold city nature to city dwellers. The four municipal gamekeepers ensure the harmonic coexistence of humans and wild animals. The nature schools provide age-appropriate experiences for the schoolchildren of Zurich. A wide range of courses and events foster the understanding of nature. Since 1931, the Succulent Plant Collection has accommodated one of the largest and most important special collections of succulent plants, including roughly 6,500 different species from more than 50 different plant families.

=== Planning/Construction ===
Open space planning, open space promotion, monuments preservation and construction projects make up the backbone of this division. It ranges from future planning and concept design of new green and open spaces to the promotion of concrete building projects to the protection and development of valuable parks within the city. In addition, this division is responsible for the construction and maintenance of parks, cemeteries, sport facilities, schools and swimming pools in urban areas that include regional public facilities.

=== Maintenance ===
There are roughly 200 employees in this division devoted to the care of parks and facilities, city trees, playgrounds, streams, cemeteries and tombs, sport facilities and fields, as well as swimming pools. This division works with the sustainability principle and advocates for the preservation of biodiversity. The green area of the city is divided into 12 districts, which are managed by Green Space Managers, who are contact people for district residents.

== History ==
Already at the end of the 18th century, a gardener was employed for the maintenance of the new facility "Sihlhölzli" and other public facilities. The beginning of the official municipal garden management dates from 1858 when Casper Hartmanns was named the first city gardener. Before then, urban promenades were maintained by city employees, who were not always qualified as gardeners.

The opening of the so-called Quaianlagen in 1887 as well as the first large incorporation of independent municipalities around the city's downtown area transformed Zurich into Switzerland's first large city. The circumstances transformed the scope of activities of the garden administration immensely. Gottlieb Friedrich Rothpletz took over in 1900, the promenade formerly being the responsibility of the city gardener, and in 1902 was made the head of the new horticulture office. His influence still can be seen through the spirit of German landscape architect and social reformer, Leberecht Migge. Migge drafted a public park that considered the city forest as a local recreational area, in opposition to decorative parks like Belvoirpark.

At the end of the 1920s, cactus grower Jakob Gasser wanted to sell his collection to the city of Zurich. The venture failed miserably. In 1929, the department store owner, Julius Brann, purchased the collection and gave it to the city as a gift. Botany professor Carl Schröter convinced the city that to accept the collection. Two years later, present day's Succulent Plant Collection, with the name "Städtische Kakteensammlung," were brought to its new home at the city's greenhouse in the former plant nursery.

In 1934, the second incorporation of the city took place which expanded the area of which the garden department was responsible. From 1940 the city's green spaces were converted into farm fields to provide enough food during World War II and increase the self-sufficiency of the country. In 1941, the new plant nursery was completed in Sackzelg.

The people acquired a taste for gardening from the so-called "war gardens" and starting in 1946 small garden allotment areas were set up. In 1959, Walter Frischknecht advocated for the reuse of G59 - 1st Swiss Horticulture Exhibition lands and for other garden design projects in the garden department. Over the course of his career, he developed other projects, such as the rose facility "Muraltengut" (1960), the "Seeuferweg" (1963), the lake promenade "Utoquai" (1971), the "Schanzengraben" (1982–1984) and the "Irisgarten" (1985).

From 1969, the first vineyards were planted below the church in Höngg from the initiative of Heinrich Zweifel. The western part of "Chillesteig" was cultivated shortly after the eastern part. From the late 1960s to the mid-70s, the lack of manpower led to insufficient maintenance of the green spaces. In 1975 a full-time Human Resources Department, including an administrative secretary, was formed that was responsible for about 400 employees.

In 1985, the residents of Zurich defended supported the preservation of green and open spaces through several referendums which led to the Garden Department's creation of a green space concept. In the same year, the Conservation Subdivision was formed, followed by the Garden Monument Preservation Subdivision in 1989.

In 1996 the first large restructuring of Grün Stadt Zürich took place when the Agricultural Subdivision which was originally located in the Health and Economic Subdivision was combined with the Garden Department and placed in the Civil Engineering and Waste Management Department. The Garden Department was renamed the Garden and Agricultural Department, and Irchelpark, Zürich's widest park was opened. Four years later, Ernst Tschannen was given the task to combine the Garden, Agricultural and Forest Departments. In 2000, the new department, directed by Tschannen, was called "Grün Stadt Zürich".

From 2001 to 2005, several new parks were created in northern Zurich: the Oerliker Park (2001), the MFO-Park (2002), the Louis-Häfliger-Park (2003), the Wahlenpark (2005) and the Leutschenpark (2008) which are distinguished by their modern and contemporary design.

From 2002 until 2011, the GSZ published Grünzeit, a quarterly magazine. The first "GrünForum," which is a public event that includes presentations on current topics and podium discussions, took place in 2003 and takes place annually.

In 2006, the GSZ published The Green Book of Zurich which describes the department's strategy for the next ten years.

The first playground which was created with input from the local children was opened in 2007 in the Hardau. In 2008 Grün Stadt Zürich had the opportunity to temporarily use a fallow field with the objective of promotion of nature, especially for schoolchildren.

The Zurich wilderness park is operated as an independent foundation which has been called a nature adventure park since September 2009. In January 2010, Grün Stadt Zürich took over management of the "Chinagarten" from the Water Supply Department.

In July 2011, Grün Stadt Zürich, in corporation with the Swiss Landscape Architects Association (Bund Schweizerischer Landschaftsarchitektinnen und Landschaftsarchitekten), will host the 48th International Federation of Landscape Architects World Congress (IFLA).

In October 2013 Christine Bräm took over the post of CEO.
