= Oerliker Park =

Park in Zurich, Switzerland

Coordinates: 47°24′53″N 8°32′17″E

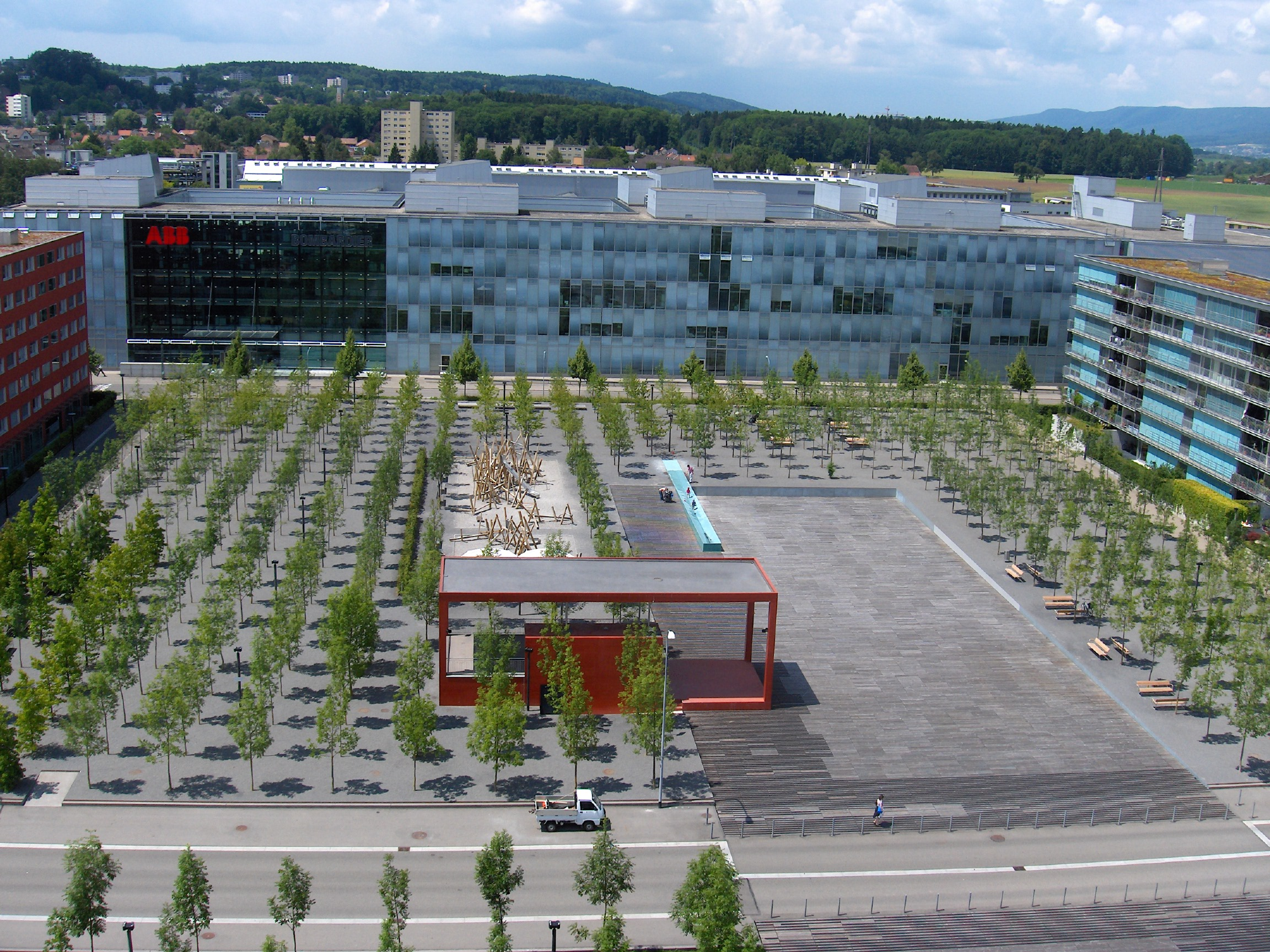
Aerial view of Oerliker Park and its intervention zone

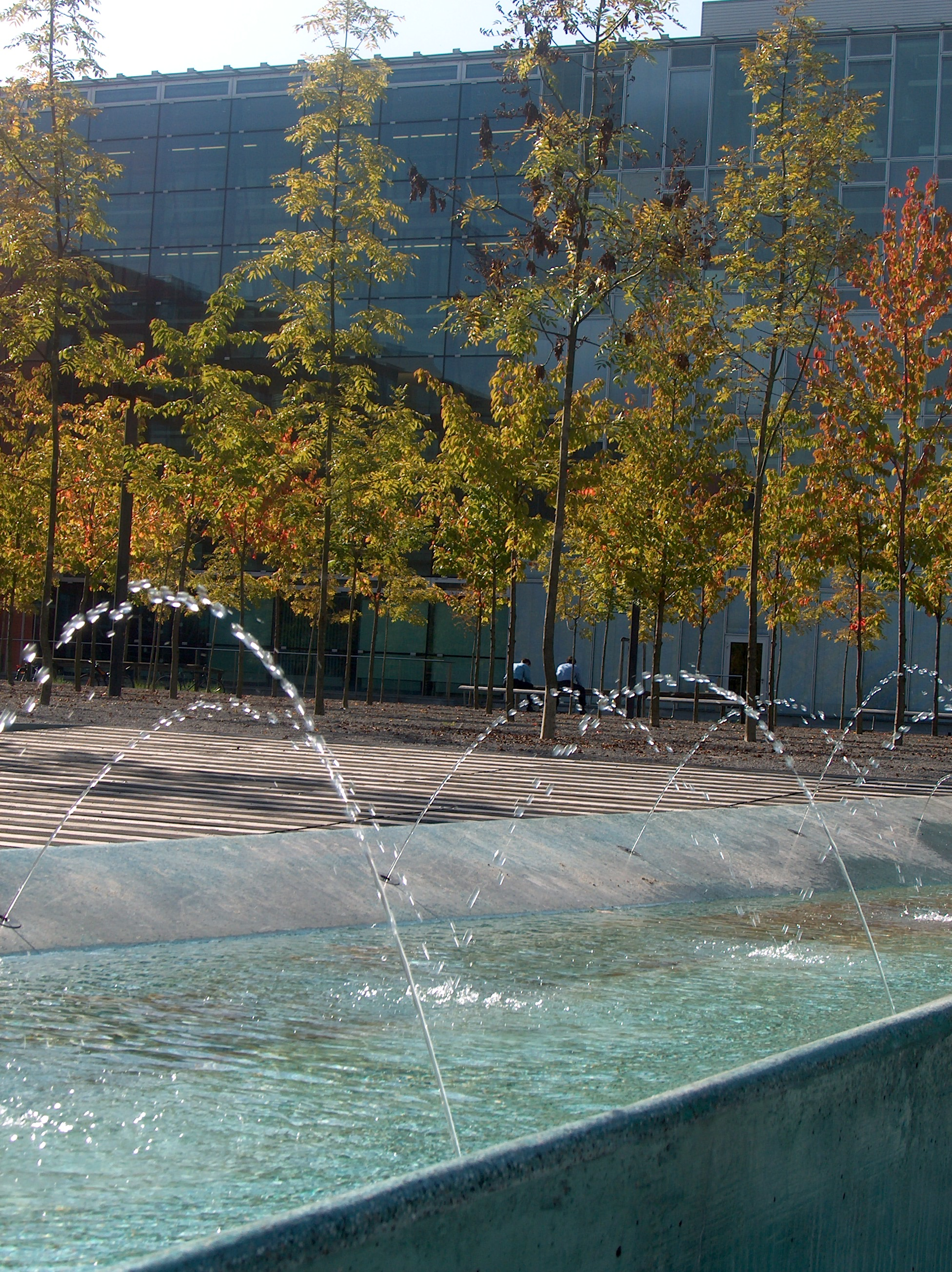
The park's fountain

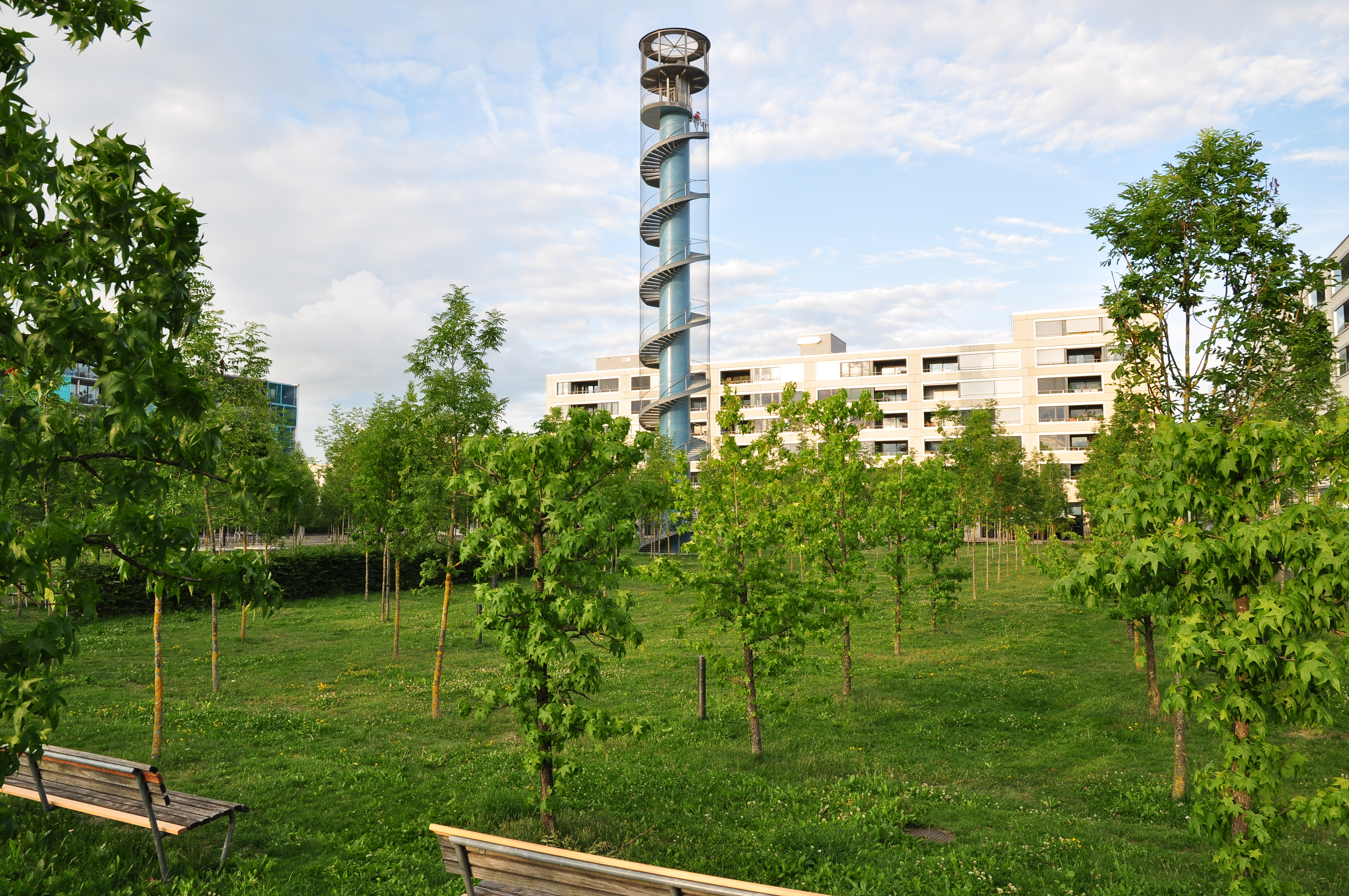
So-called Blauer Turm, the park's view tower

The Oerliker Park is a public multi-purpose district park covering 188,000 square feet (17,500 m^{2}) in Oerlikon, just to the north of Zürich. The Oerliker Park was created by the Grün Stadt Zürich in 2001 as part of the regional development project "Zentrum Zürich Nord" and was the first of four parks. The MFO-Park (2002), the Louis-Häfliger-Park (2003) and the Wahlenpark (2005) were built close-by, each of which are matched to local needs as district- and neighbourhood-parks, as well as playgrounds. Taken together, these parks embody contemporary trends of open space planning and landscape architecture. Over the course of the regional development "Zentrum Zürich Nord", the formerly urban and industrial district was given a new face.

== Development ==
The project, drafted by the project team of Zulauf, Seippel, Schweingruber Landscape Architects and Hubacher and Haerle Architects, was developed successfully from an invited study assignment in 1997. The design concept is based on the conflict between the factors of time and change. While the original depression in the eastern district remains, the western district is elevated compared to the surrounding area. This is the result of the underlying contaminated sites from past times with little earth cover. To ensure high adaptability to future usage, a separate "intervention zone" was created in the park which was intended for future developments within a particular framework.

Construction of the western part was started in 1999. The Oerliker Park was given to the people with an opening ceremony in 2001.

== Design ==
Approximately 1,000 young ash, birch, cherry and paulownia trees, and other 3- to 4-metre high species were planted on a grid of 4x4 meters, forming a walkable hall with a clearing in its centre. Over time, the park will be thinned out to a maximum of 8x8 meters.

An observation tower offers a vertical path through the tree cover across the tops of the buildings. It evokes memories of the high chimneys in the former industrial area and represents the old desire for views and distance.

In addition to this tower and the pavilion used for events, the wooden deck also creates a large open space. An attractive playground with diverse seating options complete the offering. It was designed primarily for volume and not for surface area. The multi-purpose aspect is supported by a pavilion housing the necessary fixtures and fittings for various events.

During planning and even in construction it was still uncertain when the new buildings would be constructed and how they would look. Because the full spatial limits would still be lacking for an unknown time, the park is designed as a tree body, not a hollow mould. The engagement of landscape architecture, architecture and art was the intention and aim of the project.
