= MFO-Park =

Park in the city of Zurich, Switzerland

Coordinates: 47°24′44″N 8°32′25″E

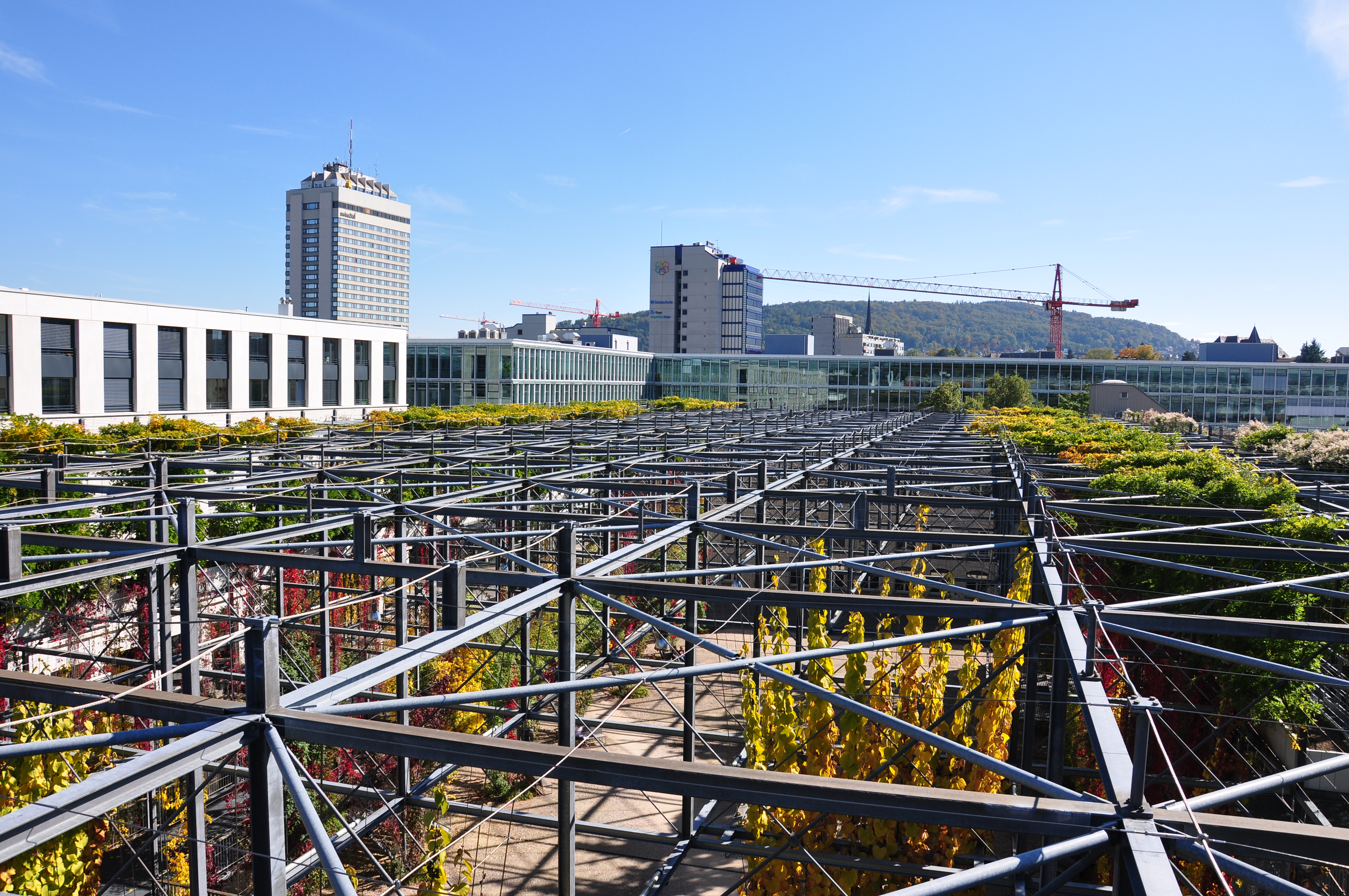
Steel frame and climbing plants

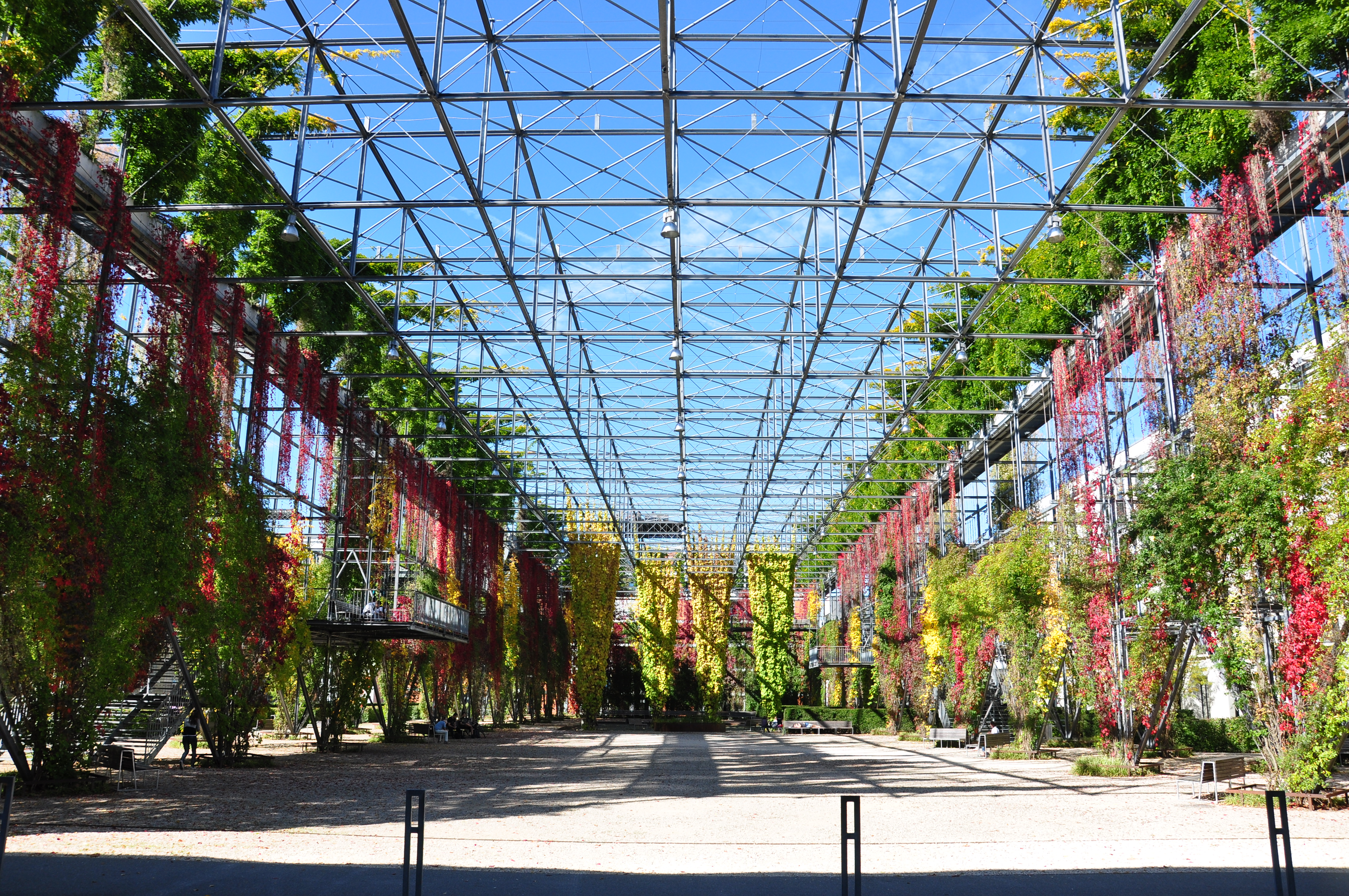
View from inside the park

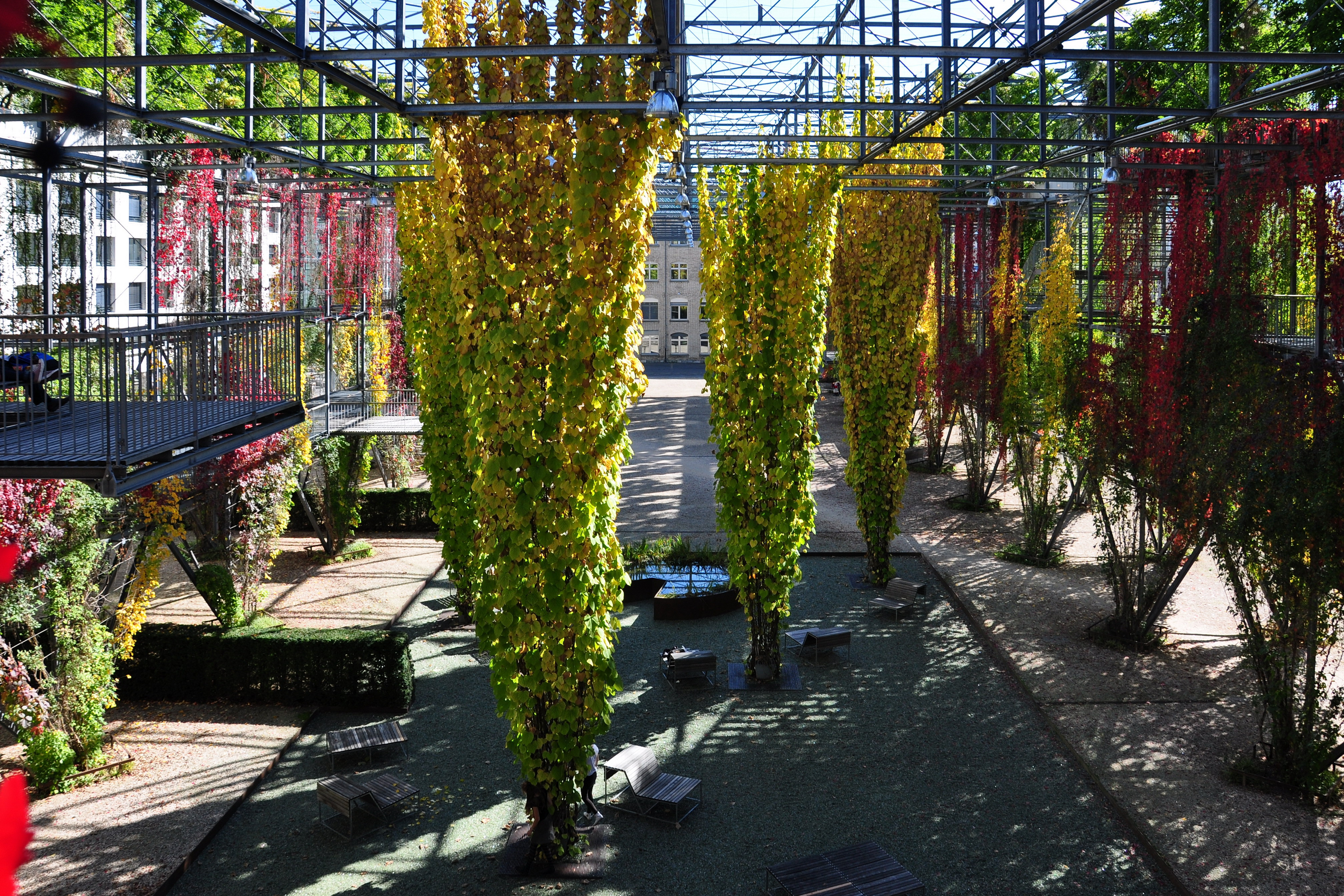
Play of light and shadow

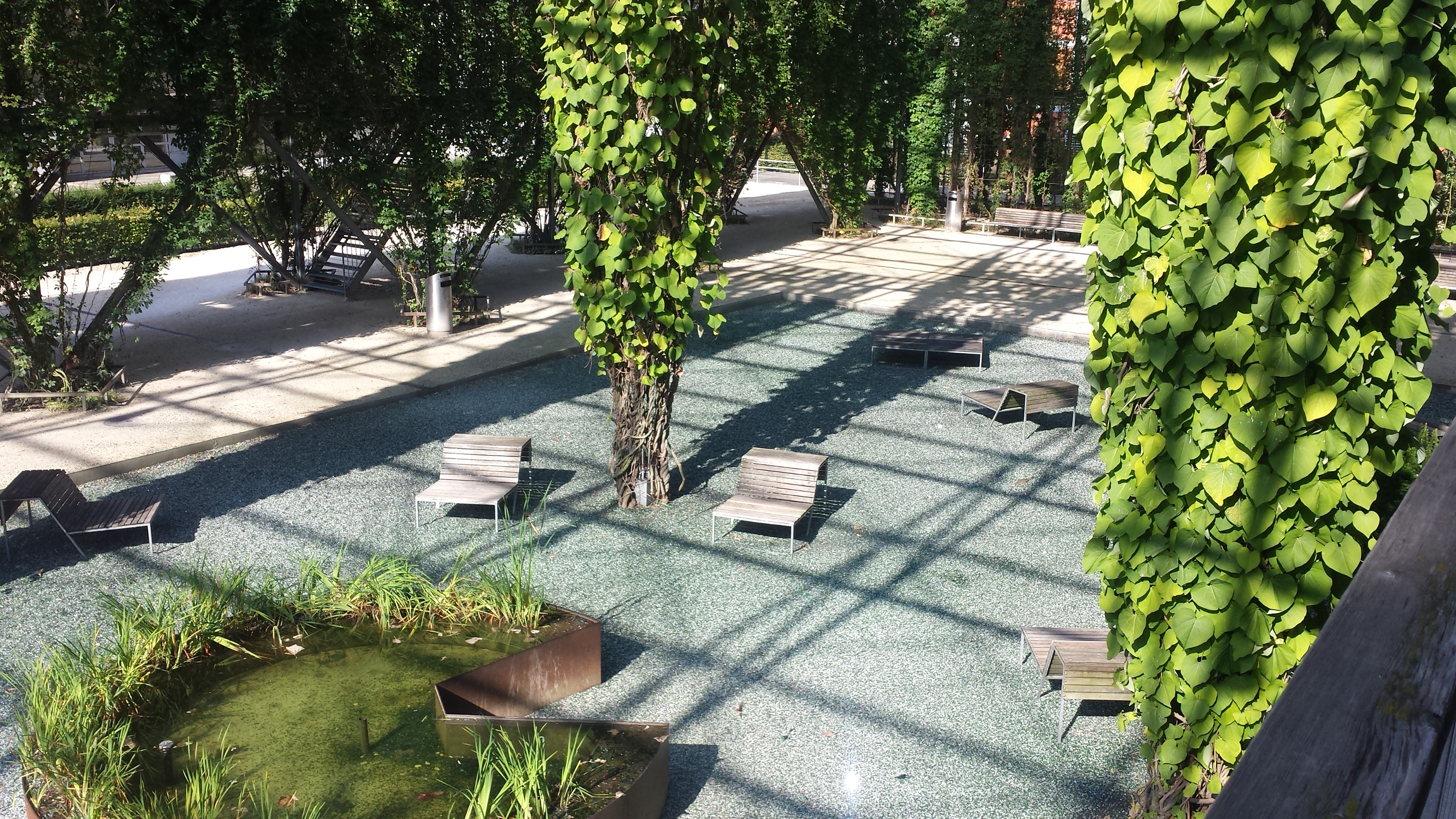
Sunken area with recycled glass floor

The MFO-Park is a public park in the Oerlikon quarter of the Swiss city of Zürich. The area to the north of Zürich Oerlikon railway station was once home to the extensive works of Maschinenfabrik Oerlikon (MFO), a site that has now been redeveloped as Neu Oerlikon. As part of that redevelopment, four new parks were created, including the MFO-Park, which was created on the footprint of one of MFO's buildings. The project was designed by the architects Burckhardt + Partner, landscape architects Raderschallpartner and structural engineers Basler & Hofmann AG.

The park is characterized by its modern and unusual design. The large “Park-Haus” is a double-walled steel-framed construction, 100 m (330 ft) in length, 35 m (115 ft) in width and 17 m (56 ft) high, reminiscent of a conservatory without glass. It is covered by a trellis (or treillage) and covered with climbing plants, resulting in a space that is filled by ever changing light, shadow and smells. The large hall space is broken up by four plant-covered wire chalices. The water basin planted with irises is located in a sunken area that is floored with recycled glass. The spaces between the double walls contain staircases, linking to balconies and platforms at different levels, including a sun deck high up on the roof that offers views over northern Zürich.

The MFO-Park accommodates a number of different activities. The facility is suitable for sport and games, for meetings of all kinds, or events such as film screenings, concerts and theatrical performances – all with a baroque backdrop of hedges. Small silent garden rooms with a view into the hall are created in the spaces between the walls, just like opera boxes.

The foundation stone was laid in autumn 2001 and the MFO-Park was inaugurated in summer 2002. As originally planned, there was intended to be a second phase which would feature an area with plant-covered pillars in front of the south side of the hall. This phase has not yet been implemented, and the four-story brick building which was originally intended for demolition to make space for this will continue to be used for the time being.

The garden has received the following awards:

- European Garden Award in the category of "Most Innovative Contemporary Park or Garden", awarded by the European Garden Heritage Network EGHN 2010
- Award for good architecture in the Zürich canton 2006 - Recognition
- Award for good architecture from the City of Zürich 2006
- 2004: MAX on top Vienna, free space 02, 2nd place 2004
- Play & Leisure Award Friedrichshafen 2004
- BDLA Prize (Association of German Landscape Architects) 2003 - Appreciation
- Public design-award 2003

== Bibliography ==
- Udo Weilacher: Ein Park als Versprechen. Oerliker Park in Zürich. und Grüner Pelz auf Stahlskelett. MFO Park Zürich. In: Udo Weilacher: In Gärten. Profile aktueller europäischer Landschaftsarchitektur. Birkhäuser Verlag, Basel 2005, ISBN 3-7643-7084-X
- Yvonne Aellen et al.: Parkanlagen in Neu-Oerlikon: Oerliker Park, MFO-Park, Louis-Häfliger-Park, Wahlenpark, Gustav-Ammann-Park. Office of Parks and Open Spaces of Zurich (Ed.), Zurich 2004.
