= G59 =

G59 or similar may refer to:

- G59 Hohhot–Beihai Expressway, China
- G59 – 1st Swiss Horticulture Exhibition
- Fiat G.59, an Italian World War II fighter aircraft
- A record label of Suicideboys
