= Sukkulenten-Sammlung Zurich =

Garden of succulent plants in Zurich (Switzerland)

Sukkulenten-Sammlung Zürich
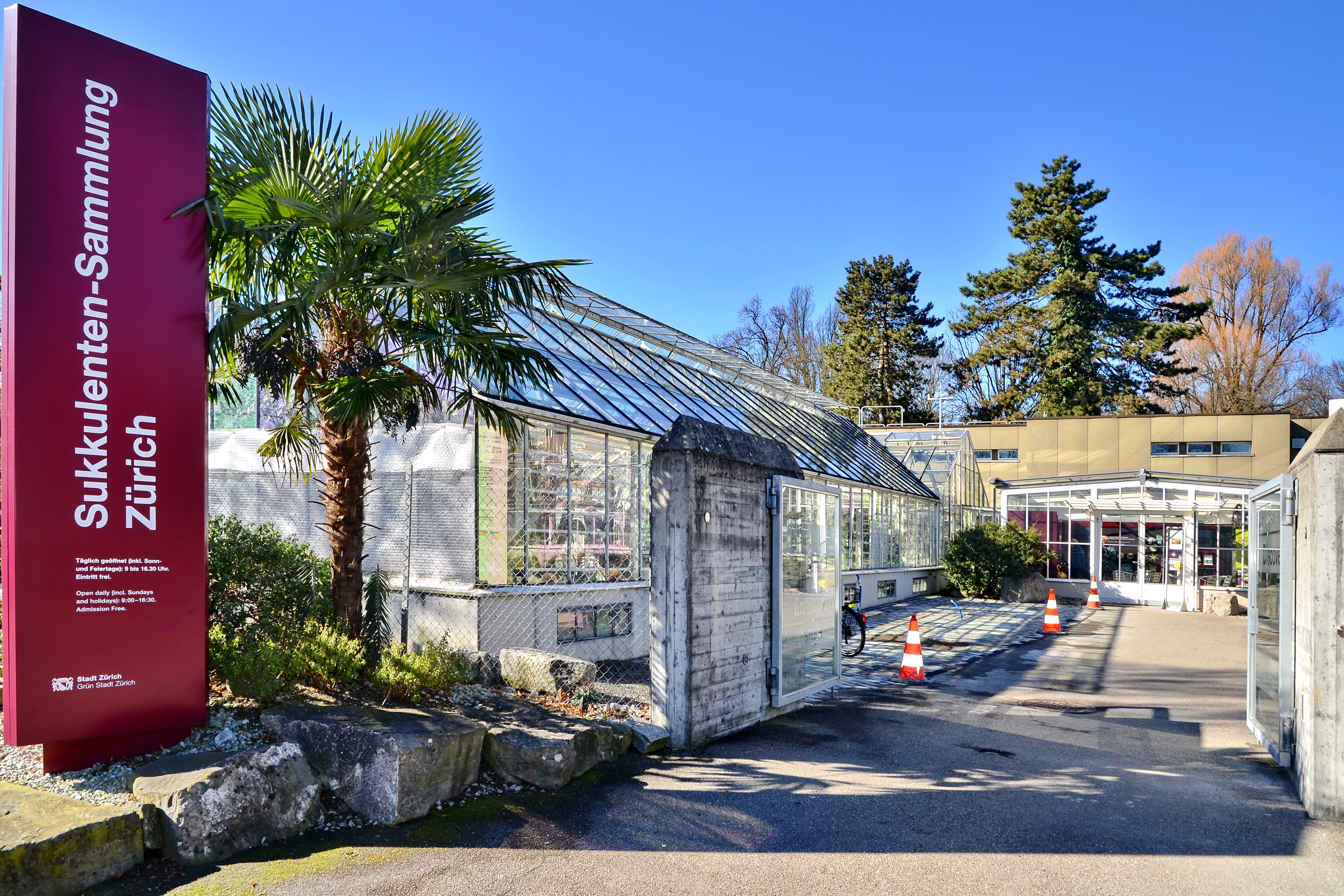
- Main entrance
- Established: 1931
- Location: Mythenquai, Enge, Zürich
- Coordinates: 47°21′21.93″N 8°32′6.35″E
- Owner: Stadt Zürich
- Public transit access: Verkehrsbetriebe Zürich: Bus line 161 and 165 stop Mythenquai; S-Bahn Zürich: S-Bahn line S8 stop Enge or Wollishofen
- Website: sukkulentensammlung.ch

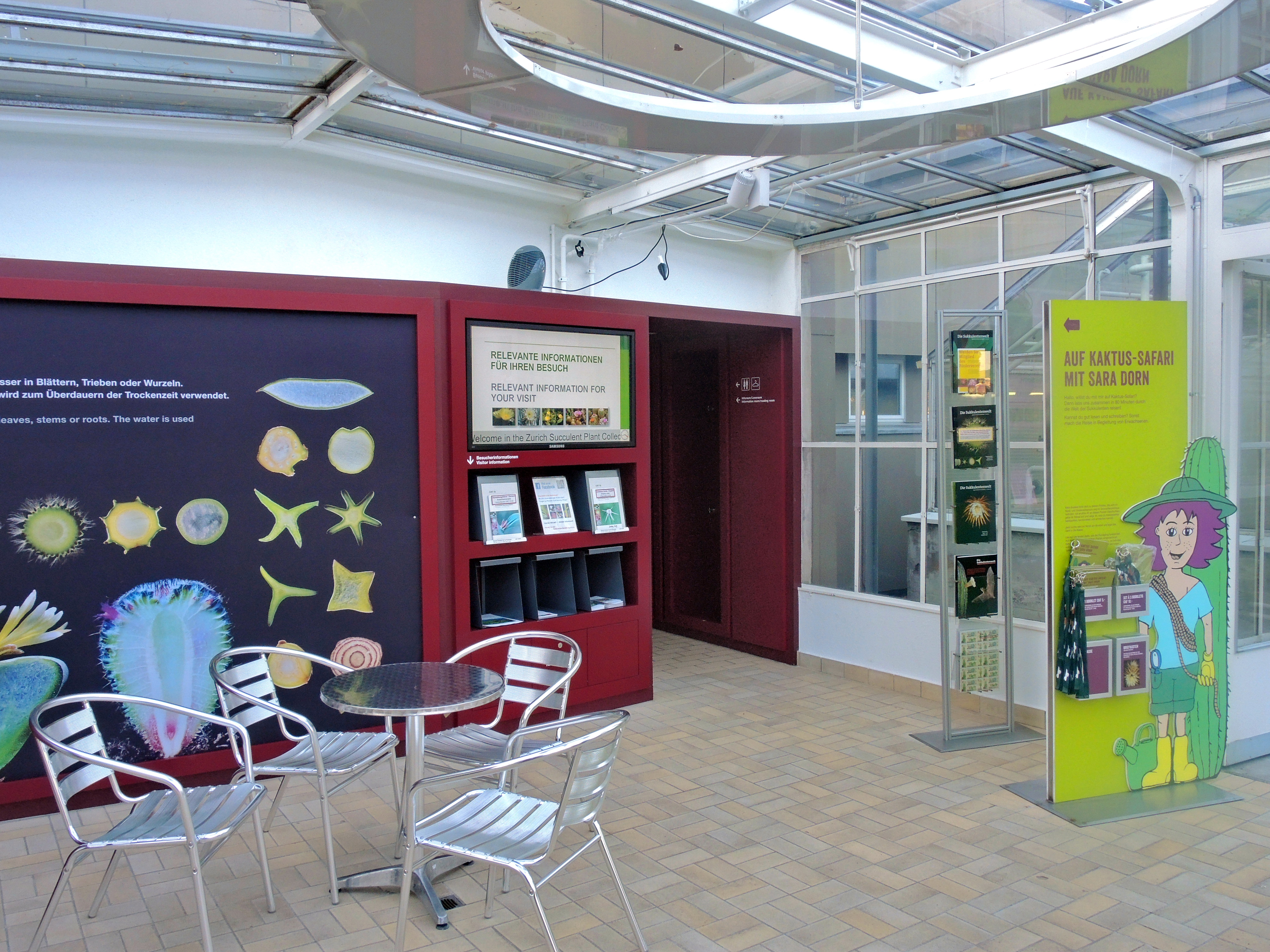
Interior at the entrance area

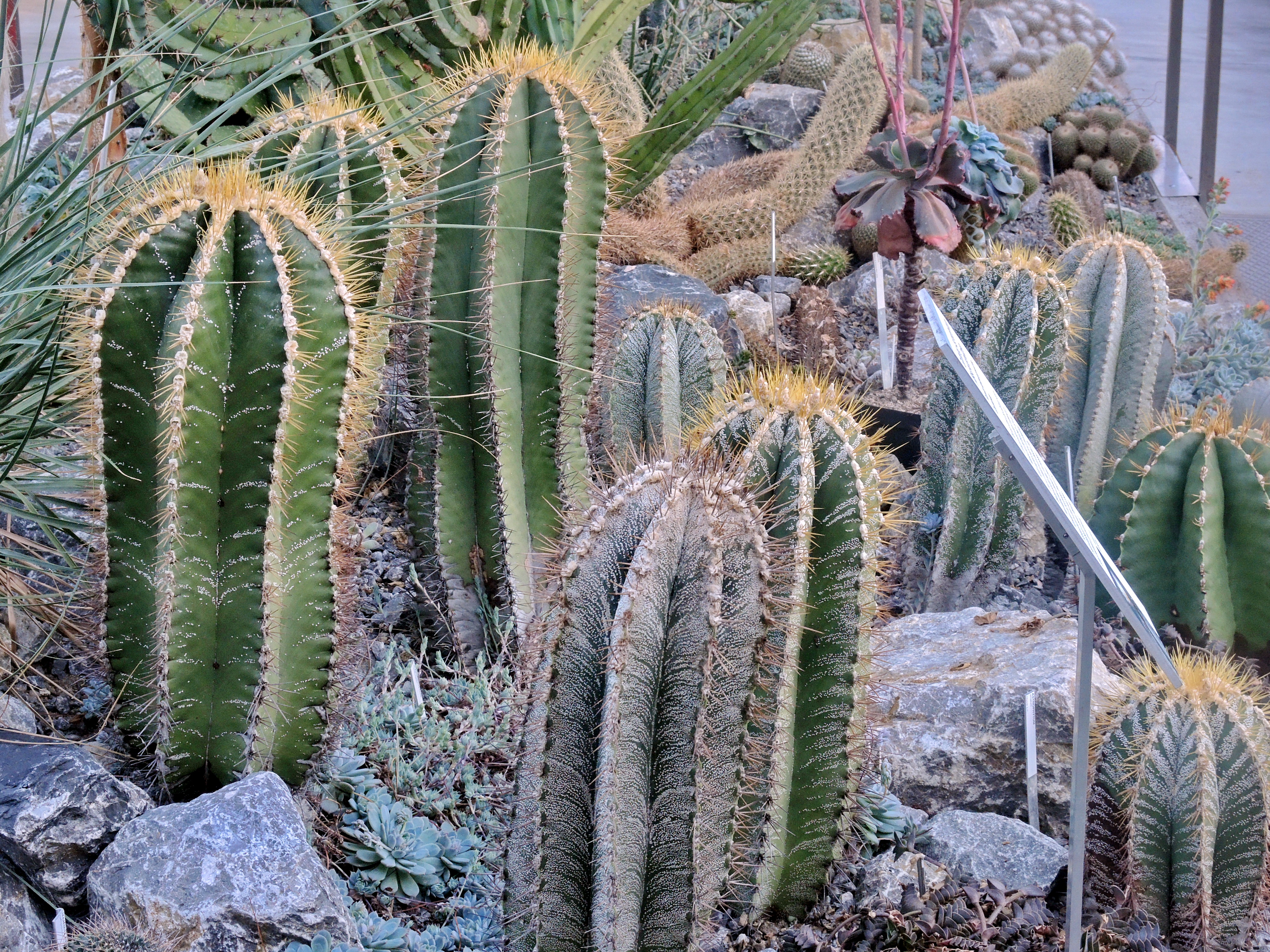

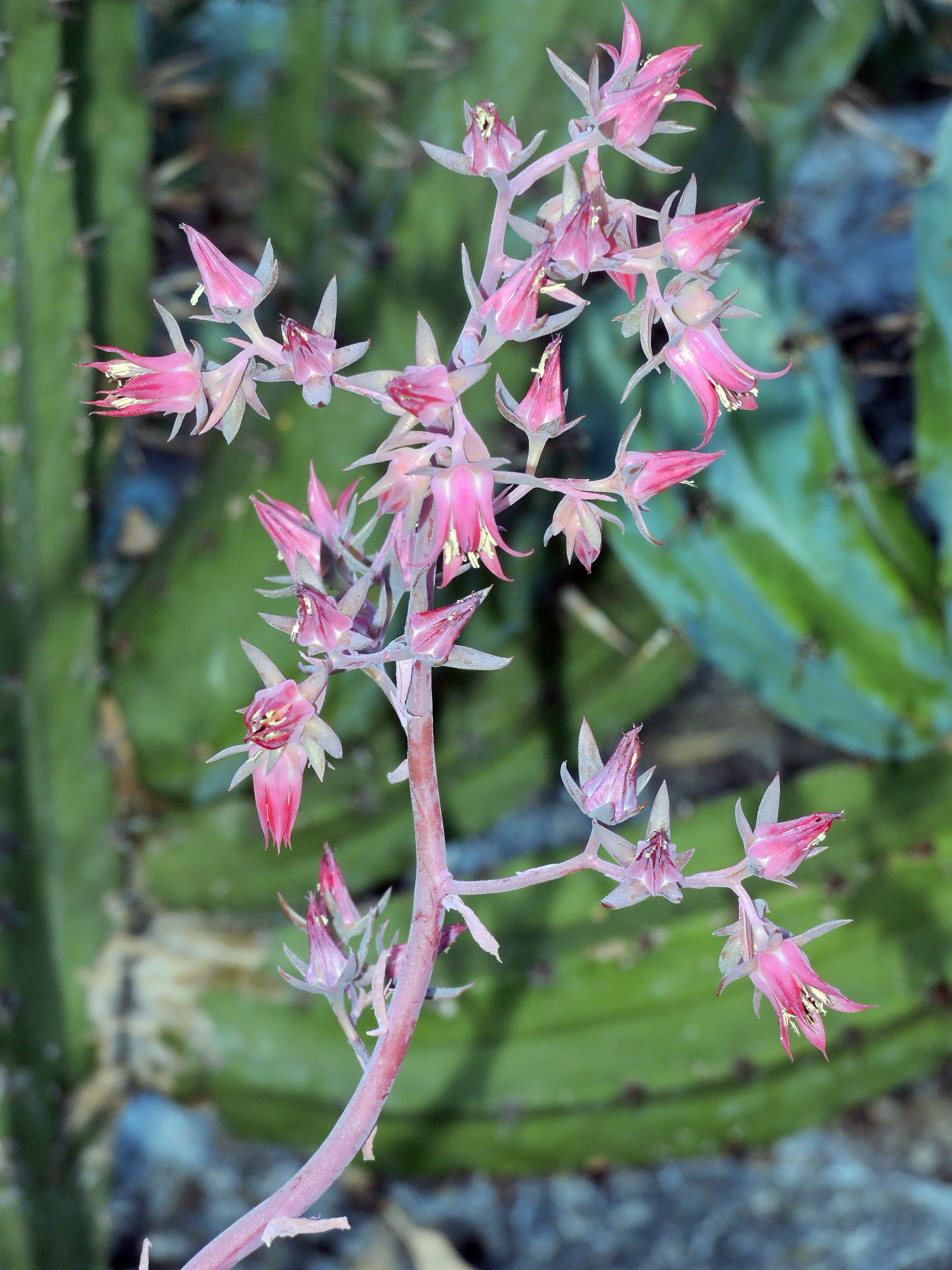

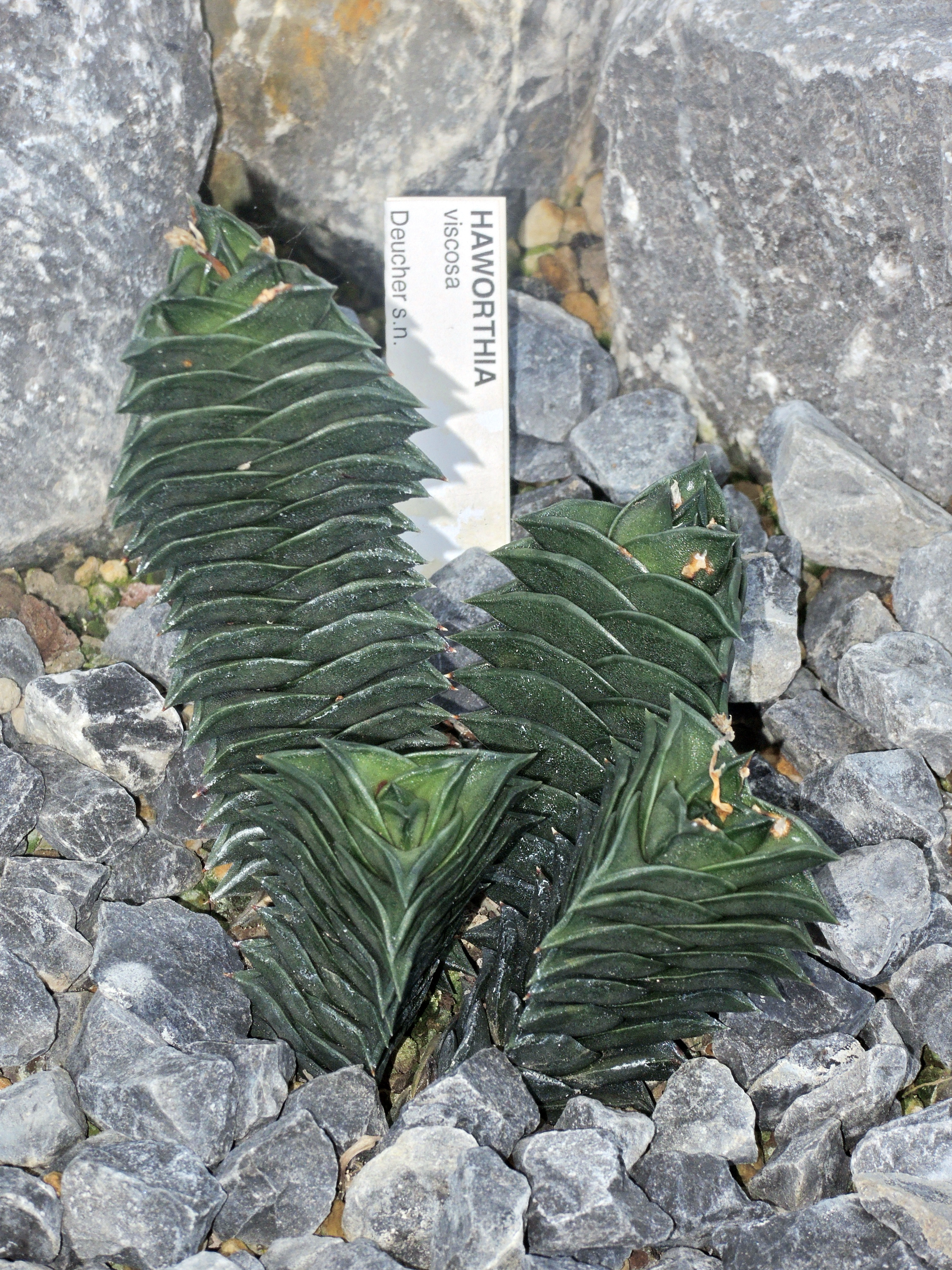
Haworthia viscosa

Sukkulenten-Sammlung Zürich, literally succulent plant collection of the city of Zürich, is a botanical garden in the Swiss municipality of Zürich. It also houses a botanic library, a herbarium and the International Organizations for Succulent Plant Research (IOS).

== Location ==
The greenhouses are located in district of Enge, on Zürichsee (Lake Zurich). They are a part of the Quaianlagen promenades, and are located on the southwestern lake shore. The collection is separated by the Mythenquai road from the lower lake shore promenade and the Enge harbour area, at the park facilities of the Mythenquai lido near the lower entrance to the Rieterpark.

== History ==
At the end of the 1920s, Jakob Gasser, a cactus grower from Zürich, tried to sell his collection of about 1,500 succulents to the city government of Zürich, but the venture failed. in 1929, Julius Brann Gassersche, a store owner, acquired the unique collection and made a gift of it to the city of Zürich. The collection was housed in the greenhouses at the former site of the municipal gardens (Stadtgärtnerei) at Mythenquai, and established as Städtische Kakteensammlung, meaning urban cactus collection.

Formally established in 1931, the collection houses one of the largest and most important collections of succulent plants. The main complex was built in 1947 and inaugurated in 1948. The succulent collection started in the existing greenhouse at Mythenquai, and was extended in 1948, 1954, 1961, 1984. In 2011, the entrance area was rebuilt and information for visitors improved. There are plans to redesign the Mythenquai area, including a renovation of the greenhouses.

== Collection and structure ==
Succulents are plants from arid areas that survive by storing water, including Agaves, Aloes and stonecrop family, in addition to Cacti and thick leaf plants. The collection features more than 6,500 different types of succulent plants from more than 80 different plant families of Orchidaceae, Crassulaceae, Euphorbiaceae, Aizoaceae, Cactaceae and Apocynaceae. The collection is funded by Grün Stadt Zürich and by the booster association, Förderverein der Sukkulenten-Sammlung Zürich. Although internationally known for its scientific objectives, the Sukkulenten-Sammlung is perceived by the public as a collection. Periodic special displays provide an insight into the survival mechanisms used by succulents.

== Facilities ==
Surrounded by a park on the lake, the facilities house over 25,000 exotic plants in about 6,500 species and varieties on 4,750 square metres (1.17 acres), including 700 square metres (0.17 acres) in six greenhouses, 16 heated cold frame boxes and an outdoor area. The staff consists of nine employees who take care of 50,000 visitors annually. The greenhouses are open daily.

== IOS library, database and herbarium ==
Since about 1947, the institution has been involved in an international seed exchange between botanical institutes and gardens around the world. Currently, there are more than 200 botanical gardens involved. In addition, Sukkulenten-Sammlung houses a specialized library on succulent plants. These books are not allowed to leave the library, but can be seen when the collection is open. The library contains more than 30,187 titles.

The herbarium was founded in 1950, simultaneously with the International Organizations for Succulent Plant Research (IOS), and has an extensive archive of plants with approximately 20,000 specimens and a meticulous tracking database. It is now under the patronage of the Swiss UNESCO commission.

== Förderverein association ==
Despite the uniqueness of the collection, in 1996 the municipal council (Gemeinderat) of the city of Zürich sought to either outsource the collection of succulents or to close the collection entirely. This political pressure led to the founding of the boosting association Förderverein der Sukkulenten-Sammlung Zürich. The council then decided to suspend the motion, until it became clear whether the Canton of Zürich and the federal authorities would become involved in co-financing.

== Cultural heritage of national importance ==
Sukkulenten-Sammlung Zürich is listed in the Swiss inventory of cultural property of national and regional significance as a Class A object of national importance.

== Literature ==
- Gartenbiografien: Orte erzählen. vdf Hochschulverlag AG, ETH Zürich, Zürich 2013, ISBN 978-3-7281-3579-7.
