= Leutschenpark =

Public park in the northern Zürich neighbourhood of Leutschenbach

Coordinates: 47°25′5″N 8°33′24″E

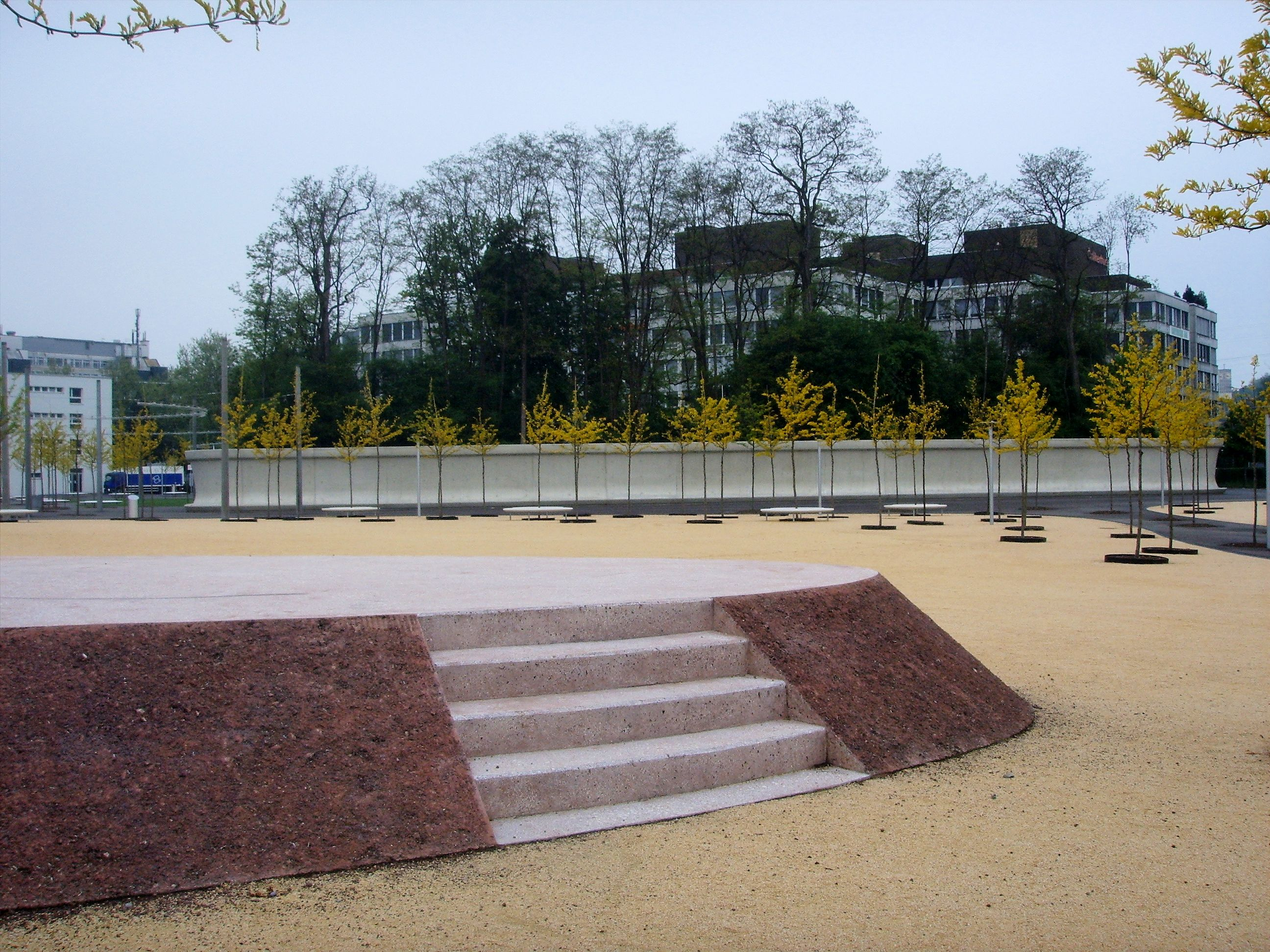
The stage and the "tree pot" in the background.

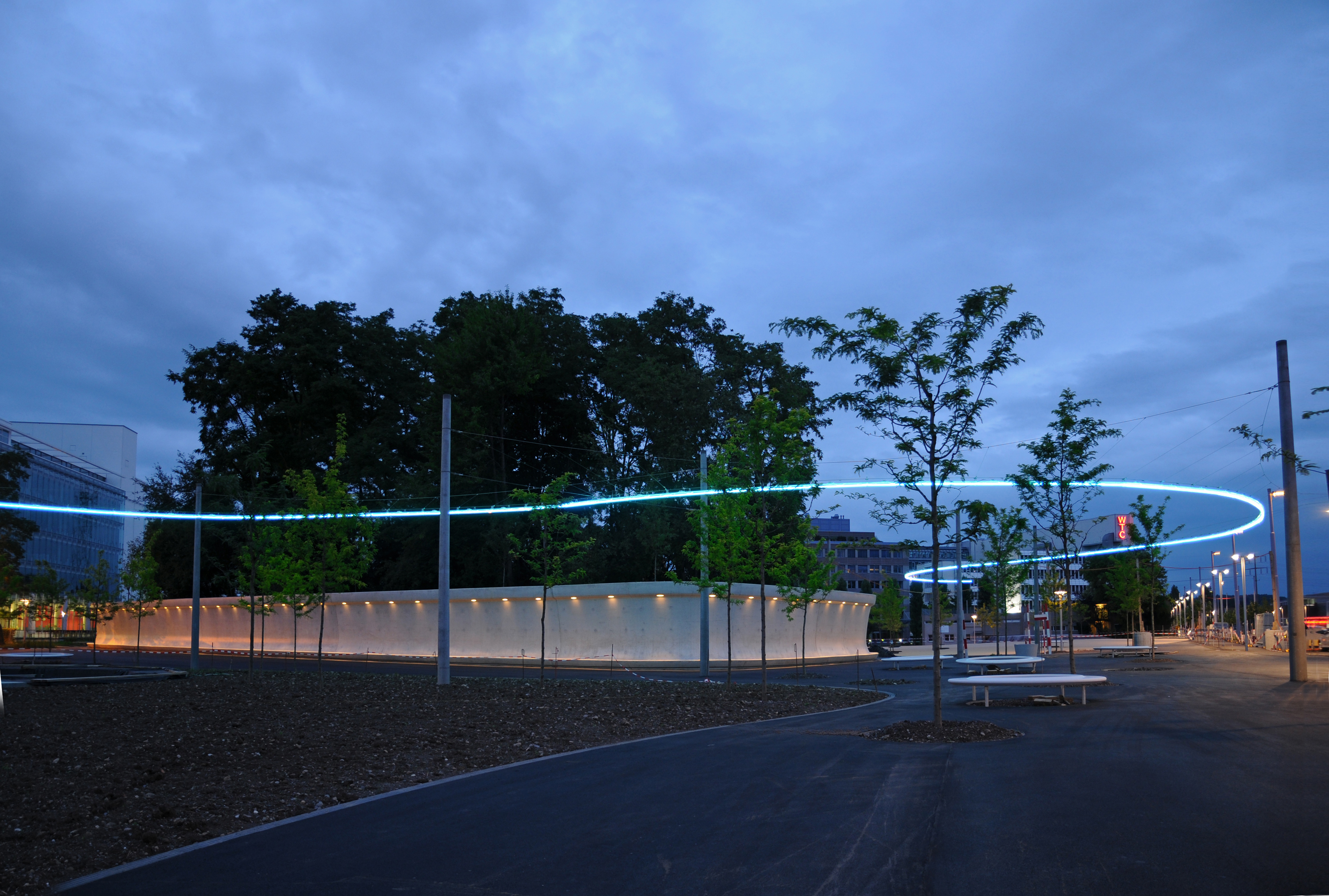
The blue "Leutschenlicht" around the "tree pot". Image: Christopher T. Hunziker

Leutschenpark is a public park in the northern Zürich neighbourhood of Leutschenbach. As the main park, the 161,459 ft² Leutschenpark and its flowing shapes bring a new accent to the district which was previously characterized by industry and service buildings. The former industrial and commercial district to the north of Zürich is being transformed into an attractive, mixed neighbourhood for living and working. This also includes first-class open spaces. The park compromises elements of a traditional city park and an urban square.

== Development ==
After the partial departure of industry and commerce, the industrial area of Leutschenbach should have become an attractive, mixed, and lively neighbourhood for living and working. However, the neighbourhood had urban planning deficits and an inadequately developed network. In 1998, a development process was started on the initiative of the landowners. The aim of the development mission statement was to create a lively neighbourhood with a first-class system of open areas. This formed the basis for the revaluation of the open space in Leutschenbach and the prerequisite for the realization of the Leutschenpark. In 2002, a competition was held by the City of Zurich to design the Leutschenpark and the Leutschenbachstrasse. The jury selected the top-rated project from the team Dipol Landscape Architects, Basel / Christopher T. Hunziker, Zurich for further processing. In 2008, the park was inaugurated as part of the Nordfest. A referendum was held to decide on a building loan of 13 million francs for the construction of the park and 22 million francs for the formal transfer of the value of the land from the city financial assets to administrative assets. Private landowners contributed approximately 5 million francs to the total costs. The Glattalbahn light railway company started construction of Glattparkstrasse to relieve Hagenholzstrasse and Thurgauerstrasse. This freed Leutschenbachstrasse from through traffic and converted it to an access road with a boulevard character. The avenue of Paulownia trees and the revitalization of the Leutschenbach stream provide this distinctive character. An open area has been created above the new clarification tanks before the confluence of the Riedgraben. Outside of the city limits, but still in the Leutschenbach catchment area, a large park area has been created with the Opfikerpark in the new neighbourhood Glattpark.

== Design ==
The park is full of wide gravel and grass areas that are partly planted with trees. The white concrete sitting wall which encircles the bullet catcher for the former shooting range forms a giant, 155-m-long «tree pot» which gives the site its particular character. The bench that runs around is integrated in the wall and is illuminated at night. The randomly placed Gleditsia provide an airy atmosphere with their slender, light green foliage. The park is complemented with a pool, stage, and a play area. The blue Leutschen light that shines at night floats between the treetops. The light installation, which was developed by the artist Christopher T. Hunziker provokes memories of the Leutschenbach stream which flows under the surface and accompanies the visitors on their stroll through the park. A small fountain provides the soundtrack for this.

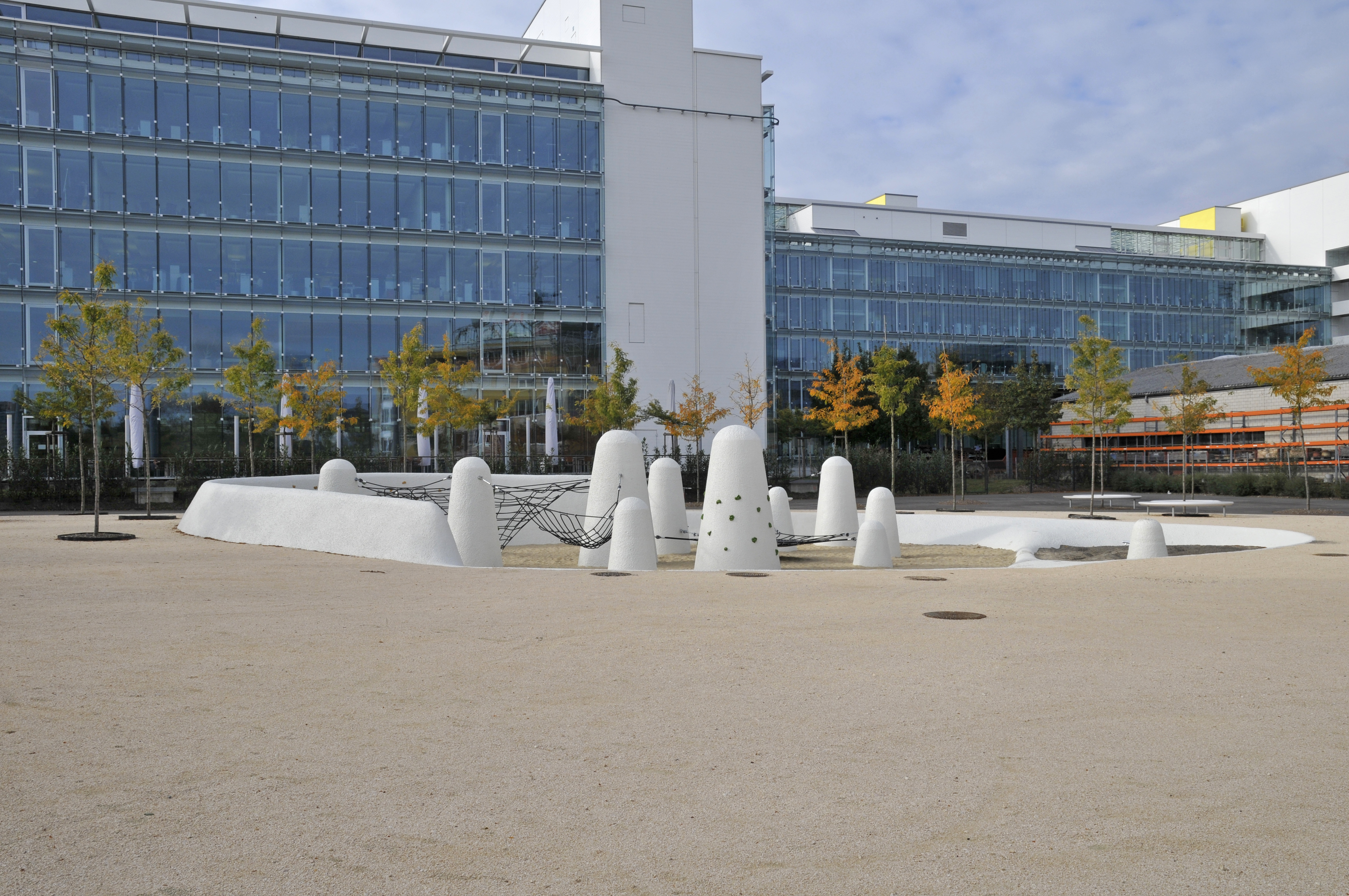
The climbing area of the park
