= G59 – 1st Swiss Horticulture Exhibition =

The G59 – 1st Swiss Horticulture Exhibition was the first of two Swiss horticulture exhibitions up until now. It took place from April 25 to October 11, 1959, in Zurich and covered an area of about 37 acres on the right and left banks of lower Lake Zurich. The two separate halves of the exposition were connected by commuter ferries and a specially created cable car.

In 1980, the "Grün 80", the second Swiss Horticulture and Landscape Architecture Exposition took place in "Münchenstein" near Basel.

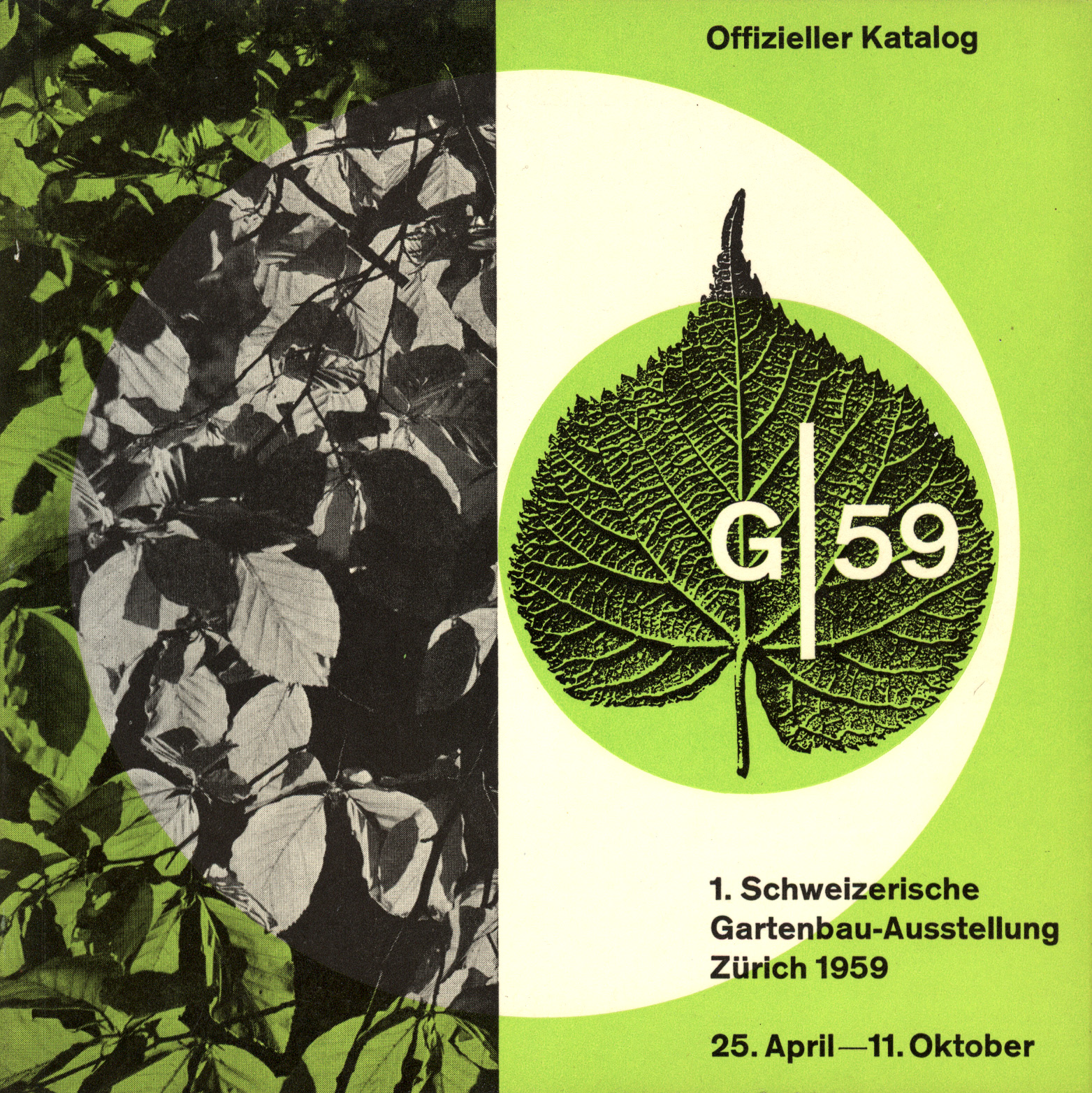
The G59 brochure, edited by Franz Fässler

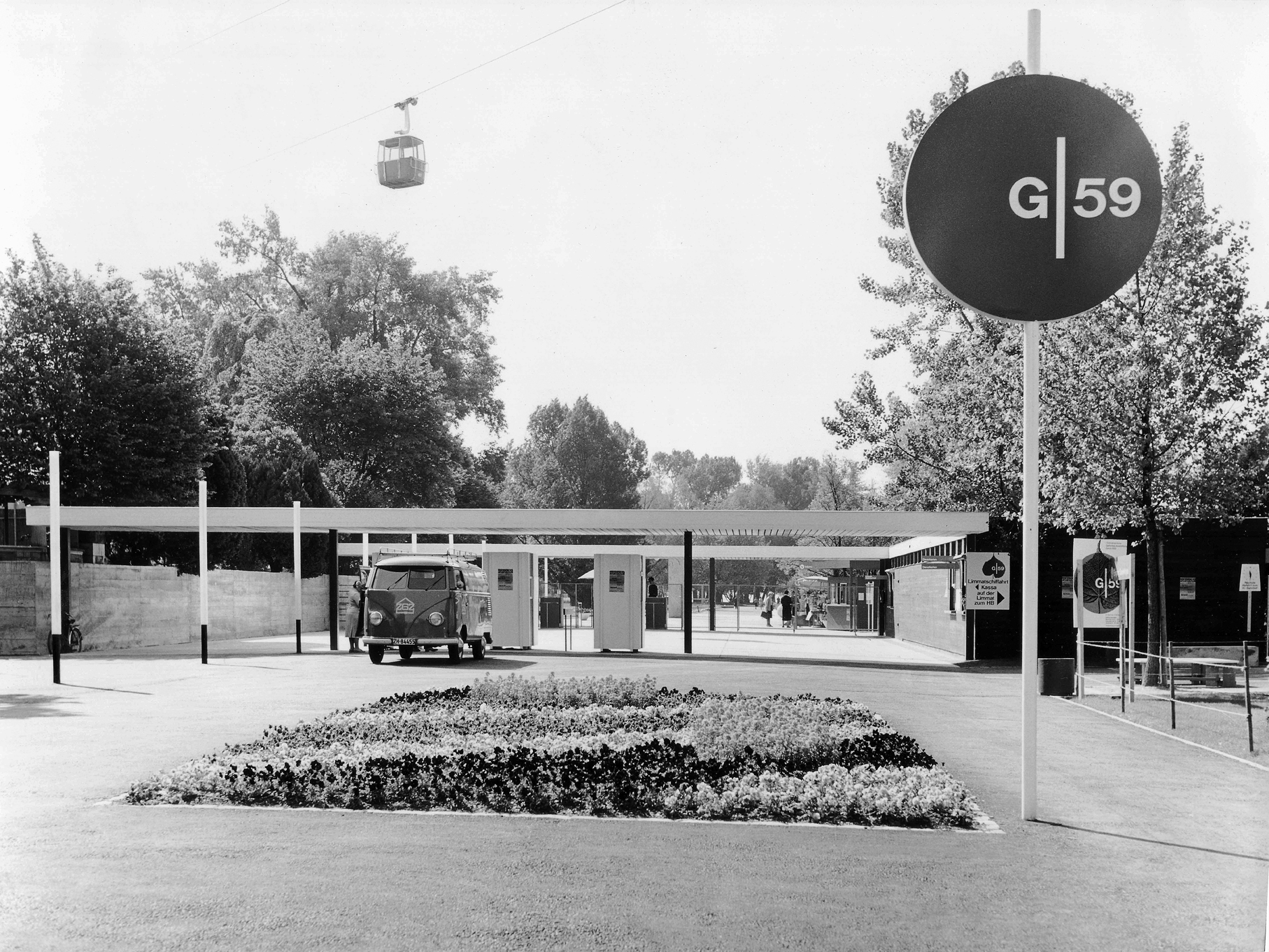
Main entrance to the right lakeside

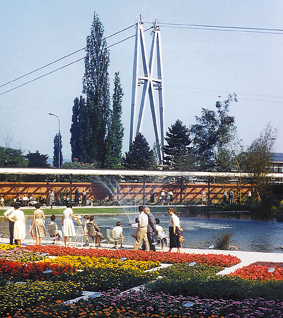
Flower parterre in Belvoirpark. In the background are two pillars from the cable car.

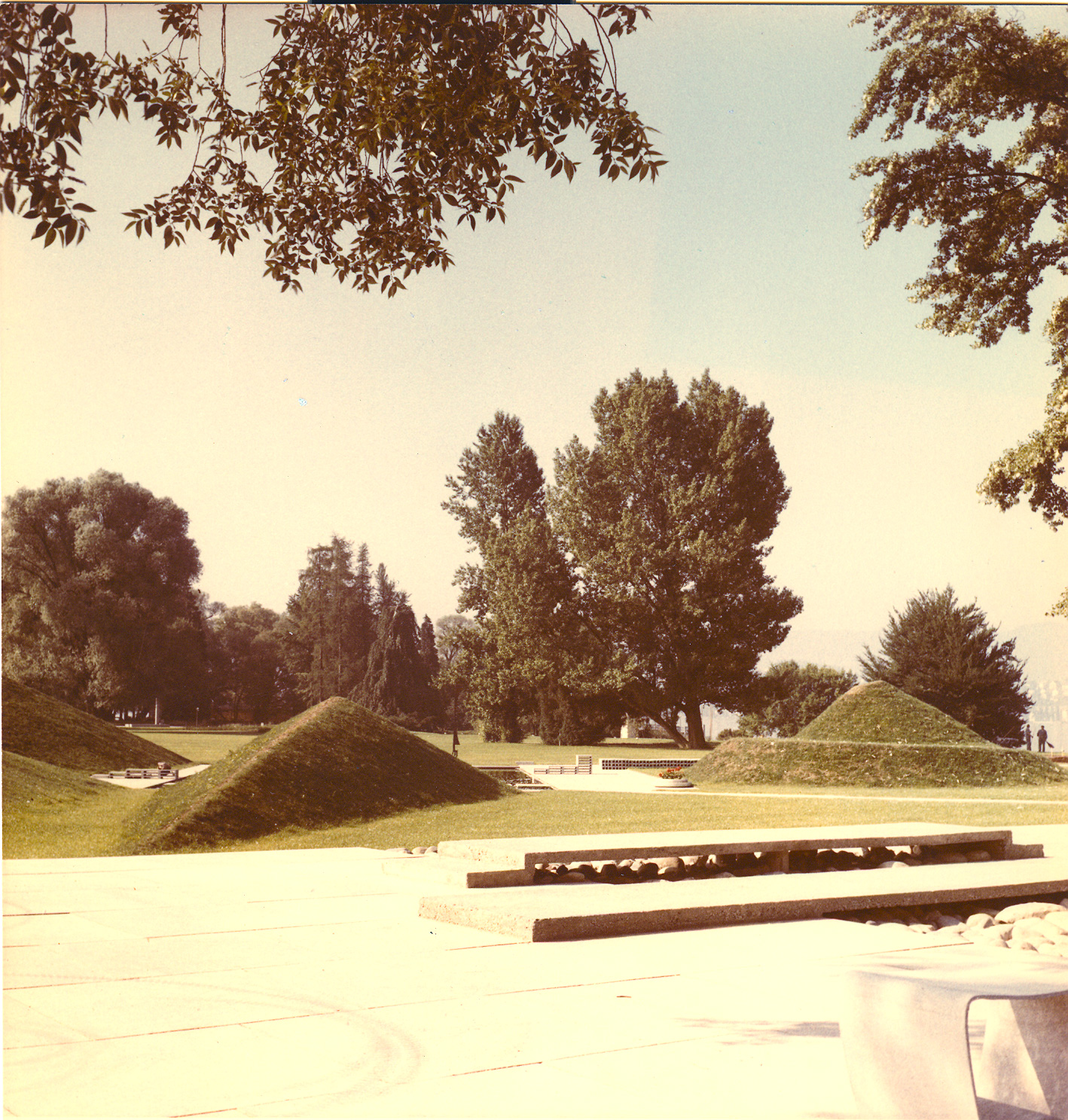
"Poet's Garden" of the right lakeside

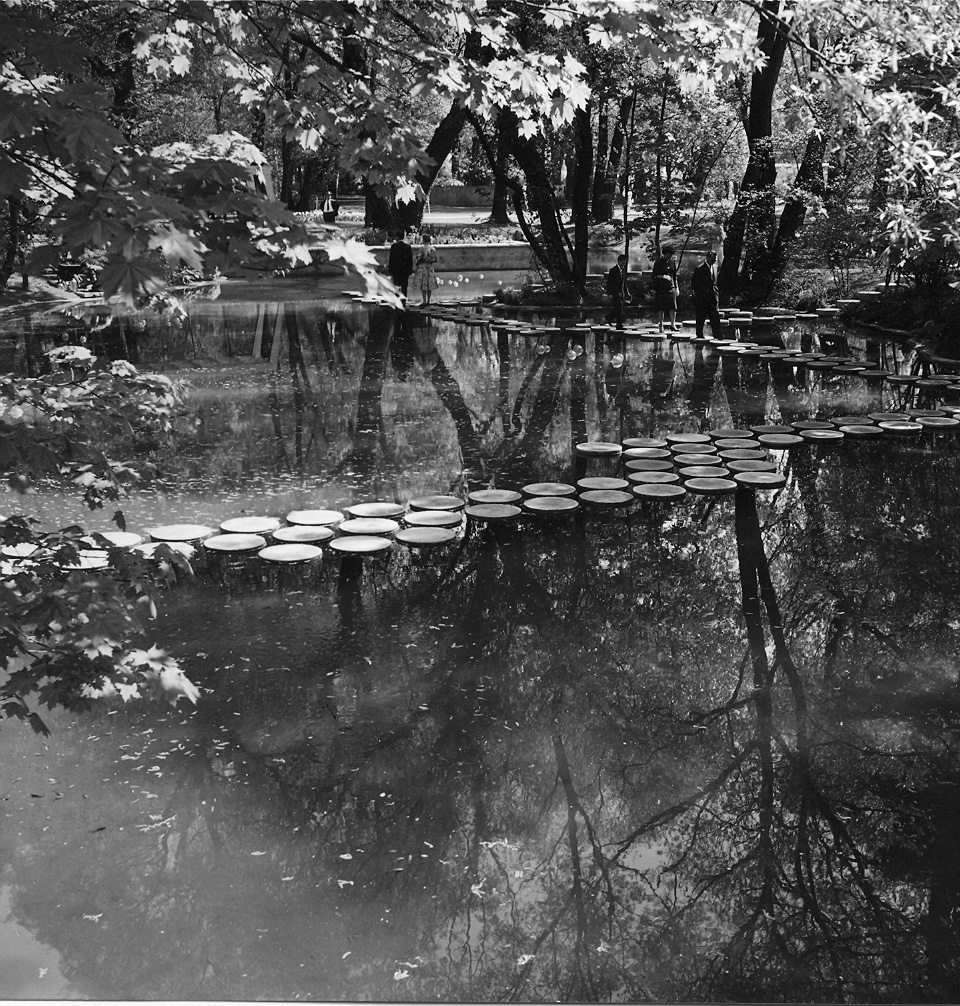
The Nymphenteich

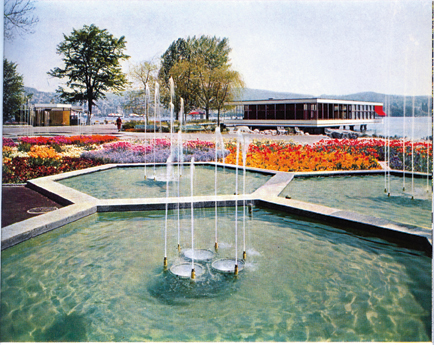
The hexagonal garden

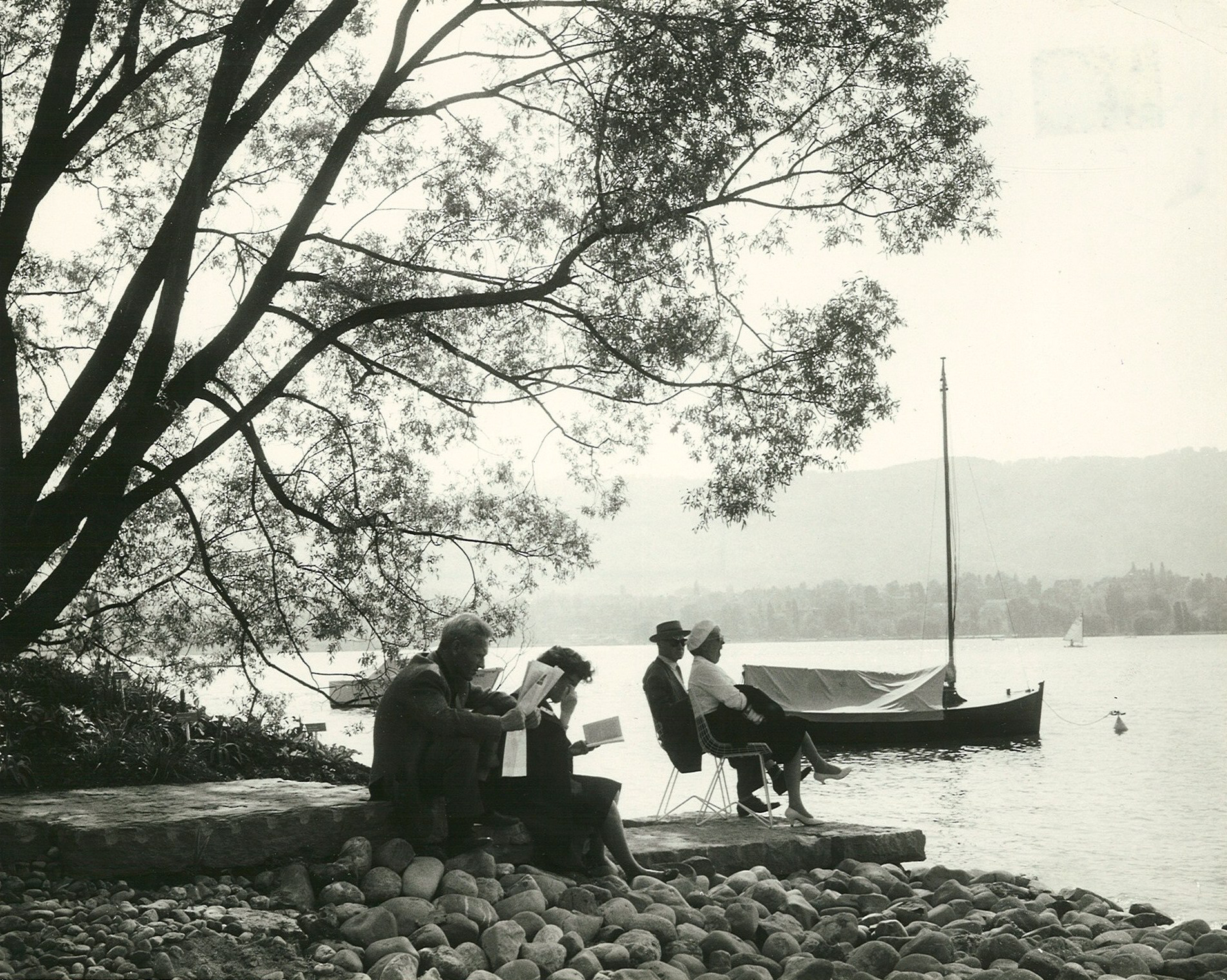
The Seeuferweg, the path along the right lakeside, after 1963

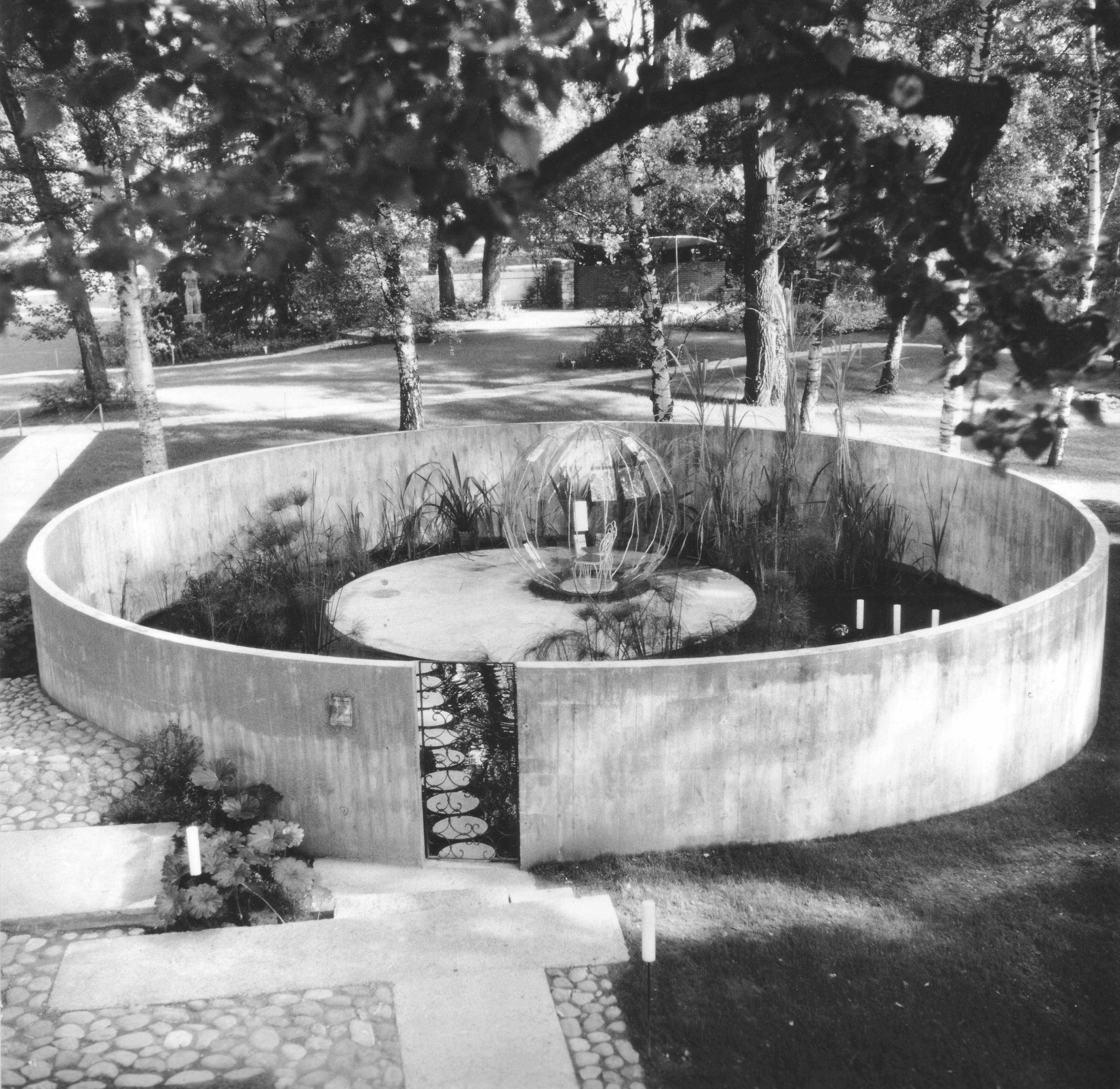
The «Jardin d'amour», the garden of love

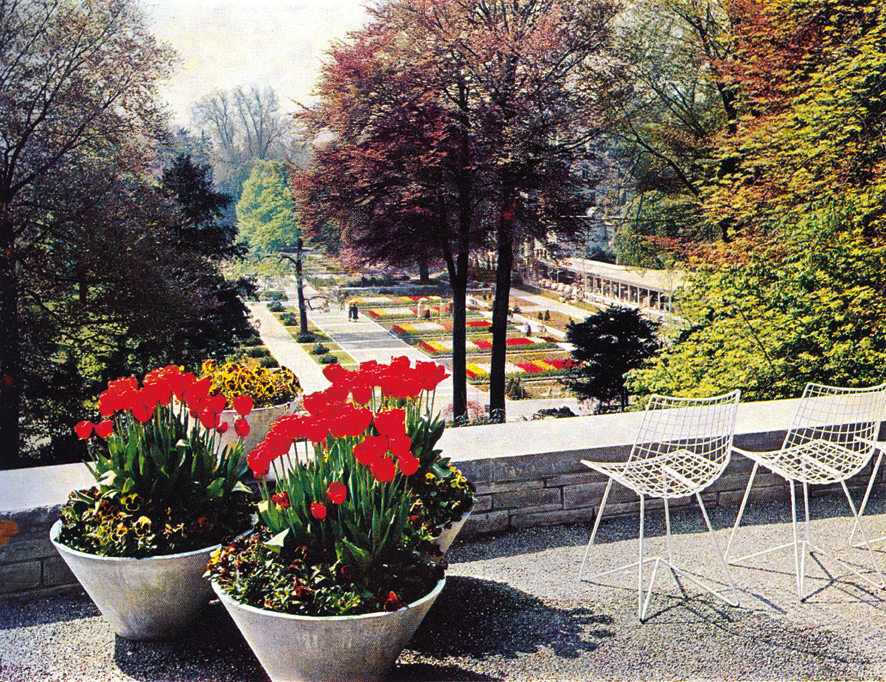
The observation platform in Belvoirpark

== Goals and topics ==
Driven by commercial and creative professional associations, which were shaken by the economic crises and were desperate for reorientation, the G59 provided a highly diverse exposition of themed parks, gardens types, plants and their application, special exhibitions of plants and vegetables, garden devices and gardening specialties and garden arts, as well as various complementary events, including a colorful entertainment program.

The goal of the G59 was to promote Swiss horticulture and give young people an understanding of horticulture and landscape architecture. The G59 was set up based on the structure of the German horticulture expositions, which advocated for profession and the reconstruction of cities destroyed in World War II, and of the “Landi”, the Swiss national exhibition in 1939, which created identity during the crises. The visible parallels to the “Landi,” such as the cable car across the lake, earned it the nickname of Flower-Landi (colloquially “Blumen-Landi”).

== Overall plan ==
The overall planning was the task of garden inspector Pierre Zbinden, director of the garden department (today's Office of Parks and Open Spaces of Zurich). Under the architectural supervision of Werner Stücheli and Paul R. Kollbrunner, various temporary and a few permanent facilities were built on either side of the lake. Despite the shared overall planning, both shores are different from each other as different planning offices were assigned to the development of the project. On top of that, the two lakesides vary in local and topographic characteristics.

The left lakeside was designed by Klaus and Walter Leder with the collaboration of Johannes Schweizer. They had to deal with variable spaces, a steep slope and a bypass to an arterial road. The themed gardens were reminiscent of concrete art and attracted attention with colorful and varied plantings. One of these themed gardens consisted of a geometrically arranged flower parterre which was changed over the course of the seasons. Klaus and Walter Leder's draft, “Landhaus und Garten,” was meant to extend the spatial logic that accentuated the garden over the house and to avoid the reverse.

On the right lakeside, the two landscape architects Ernst Baumann and Willi Neukom had the opportunity to plan their project on a flat and nearly continuous area. Pavilions and exhibition halls were built along Seefeldstrasse, which leads out of town, whereas the area facing the lake was used for special gardens and entertainment. The logically constructed road network, which was also built for delivery purposes, was supplemented with beautifully landscaped walking paths.

Willi Neukom explained the special architecture of the themed gardens as follows: “Romantic themes, which were given a modern appearance by using contemporary building materials such as concrete, glass and molded blocks, are chosen quite deliberately. By ascetic simplification of their shape, which is only confined to the essential, they can count on an immediate message and effect.”

The shrub garden, located between Blatterwiese and Zürichhorn, was considered a stylistic fore-runner of lakeside design. An innovative feature of this garden was the placement of stepping stones embedded within fine stones, created a smooth transition from the shoreline to the lake and path network, which enhanced the direct experience of visitors with the water, were two innovative features.

== Participating associations ==
Verband Schweizerischer Gärtnermeister, Gärtnermeisterverband Zürich, Association des Horticulteurs de la Suisse Romande, Schweizerischer Floristenverband, Verband Schweizerischer Topfpflan-zengärtnereien, Verband Schweizerischer Baumschulbesitzer, Bund Schweizerischer Gartenarchitekten

== Poet's Garden ==
The most controversial object of the exhibition was probably the minimalistic "Poet's Garden".

Landscape architect Ernst Cramer, who considered himself more of an artist than a gardener, designed an abstract landscape by using earthen mounds, water and modern iron sculptures. The whole facility was built with respect to abstract-geometrical principles. Whereas the public was confused by its design, experts were delighted.

A letter, written by the architect, artist and earlier director of the school of arts, Hans Fischli, to Cramer said: “You create a sense of space that I have never experienced before in the open air. You prove that a clever mind combined with the precise use of the trade does not have to apply the same technique for soil as the force of the natural elements do. You do not create an imitation of a natural reality, but you fabricate a work which we abstract painters and sculptors have tried to attain through practical measures for many years.”

== Good shapes and new graphics ==
The breakthrough of new elements and materials in horticulture can be traced back to influences from the arts, architecture and design. The ideas of the Swiss Work Federation (Schweizerischer Werkbund), to emphasize the functional form and to experiment with elements like concrete and fiber-cement, were adopted in commercial as well as artistic domains. In 1954, designer Willy Guhl presented his famous Eternit beach chair in the form of a loop.

The minimalistic form and low material costs as well as the ergonomic design of the garden furniture resulted in the Werkbund's prize, called “Die gute Form” (the good shape). The creative possibilities of the new Eternit material led to the advertisement of a competition on garden furniture and plant containers, which was organized by the exhibition directors with collaboration from the German enterprise Eternit AG. Contemporarily shaped stools, pots and troughs were designed as a result of this competition.

The G59 provided an experimental field for the New Graphic movement as well. Brochures, posters and labels were created according to the constructive-concrete design principle, which fostered the fusion of typographic and pictorial elements. The signet and the graphical appearance of the G59 represented the typical modern Swiss style, which was internationally groundbreaking.

== Arts at the G59 ==
In addition to garden and plant exhibitions, the G59 provided a wide range of supporting programs, which included fashion shows, art exhibitions and philatelic events.

Art historian Willy Rotzler organized an open-air exhibition where abstract sculptures from Swiss artists, such as Max Bill and Walter Bodmer, were shown. This art exhibition was not meant to compete with the horticultural and landscape architectural presentations, but to advocate for the aesthetic education of the viewers.

== After-effect ==
Some of the gardens, art work and facilities are preserved still today. On the right lakeside, the shrub garden, the “Azaleental”, as well as the “Nymphengarten” with its stepping stones near the “Fischerstube” and some of the sculptures have survived to the present day.

On the left lakeside, the pergola, the trick fountains in Belvoirpark, as well as parts of the hexagonal combs at Enge port were incorporated into the shoreline of Lake Zurich.

In the 1980s, the controversial, and therefore quickly removed, Poet's Garden was not only acknowledged for artistic reasons, but also taken as an occasion to reestablish the formal design of the landscape, which opposed the former natural garden movement.

The G59 also fostered modern urban development visions. Ernst Baumann and Willi Neukom were given the task of developing a reuse plan for the G59 grounds. They considered a project similar to the one of Le Corbusier. Even though such artistic utopias had been widely discussed, the Seefeld and Enge districts preserved their structural layout.

== Cable car ==
As the G59 took place on both sides of the lake, a direct and quick form of transportation of the visitors from one side to the other was necessary. As with the Landi in 1939, a flotilla of commuter ferries was set up. Once again, a cable car was constructed, whose 55-m-high pillars became a special attraction. These pillars, which were designed by architect Werner Stücheli with collaboration from engineer Max Walt, were exuberantly praised in the magazine “Schweizerische Bauzeitung”: “A few weeks ago the big surprise: The cable car's pillars, which connect the banks. Their beauty and greatness surpass everything that could be seen in an exhibition on architecture in previous years, even Brussels.” In contrast to the one of 1939, the G59 cable car survived for seven years. In 1966, the pillars were removed to once again allow an unobstructed view to the Alps.
