= Louis-Häfliger-Park =

Park in the city of Zurich, Switzerland

Coordinates: 47°24′45″N 8°32′2″E

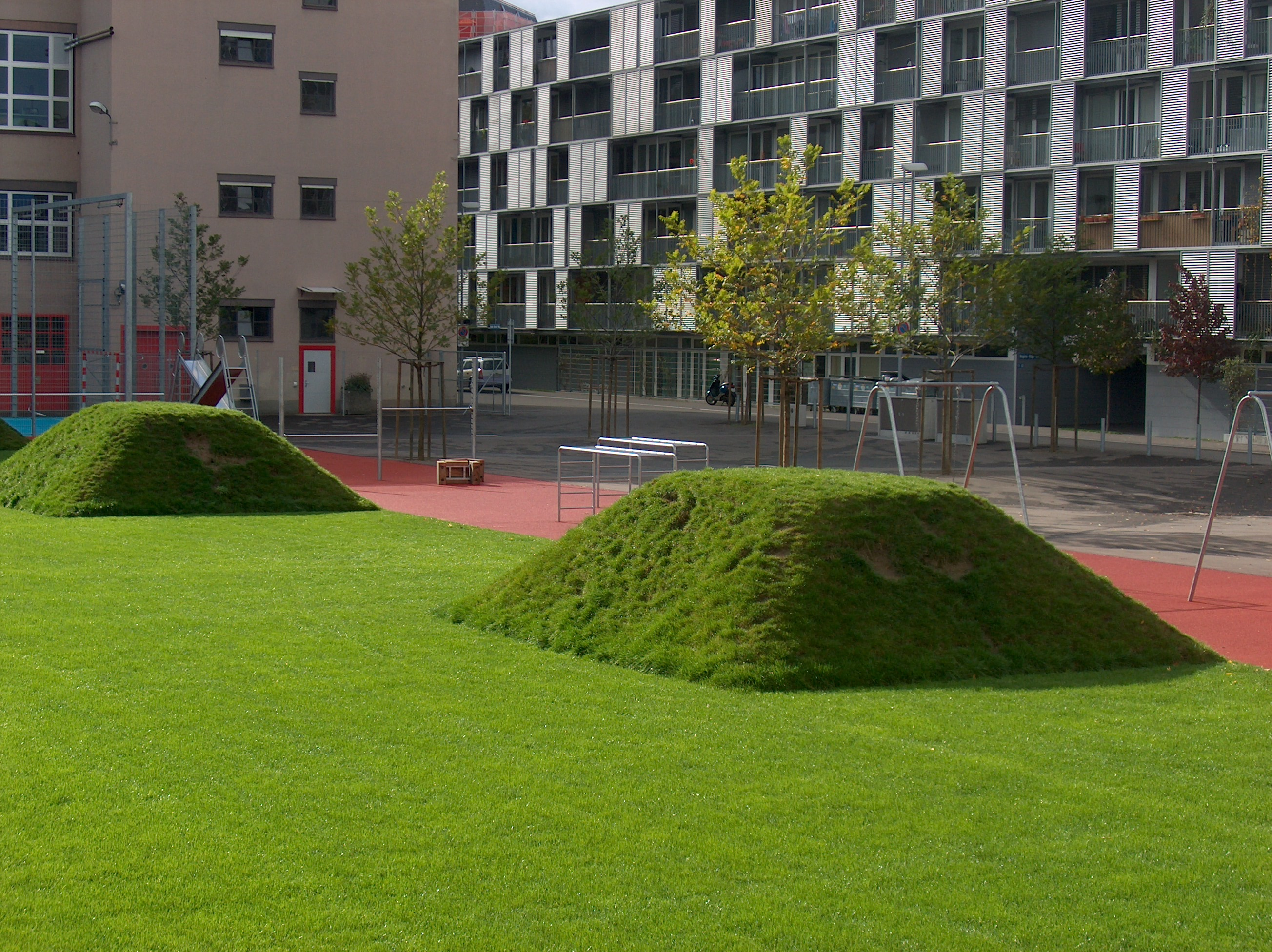
Louis-Häfliger-Park and its grass pyramids.

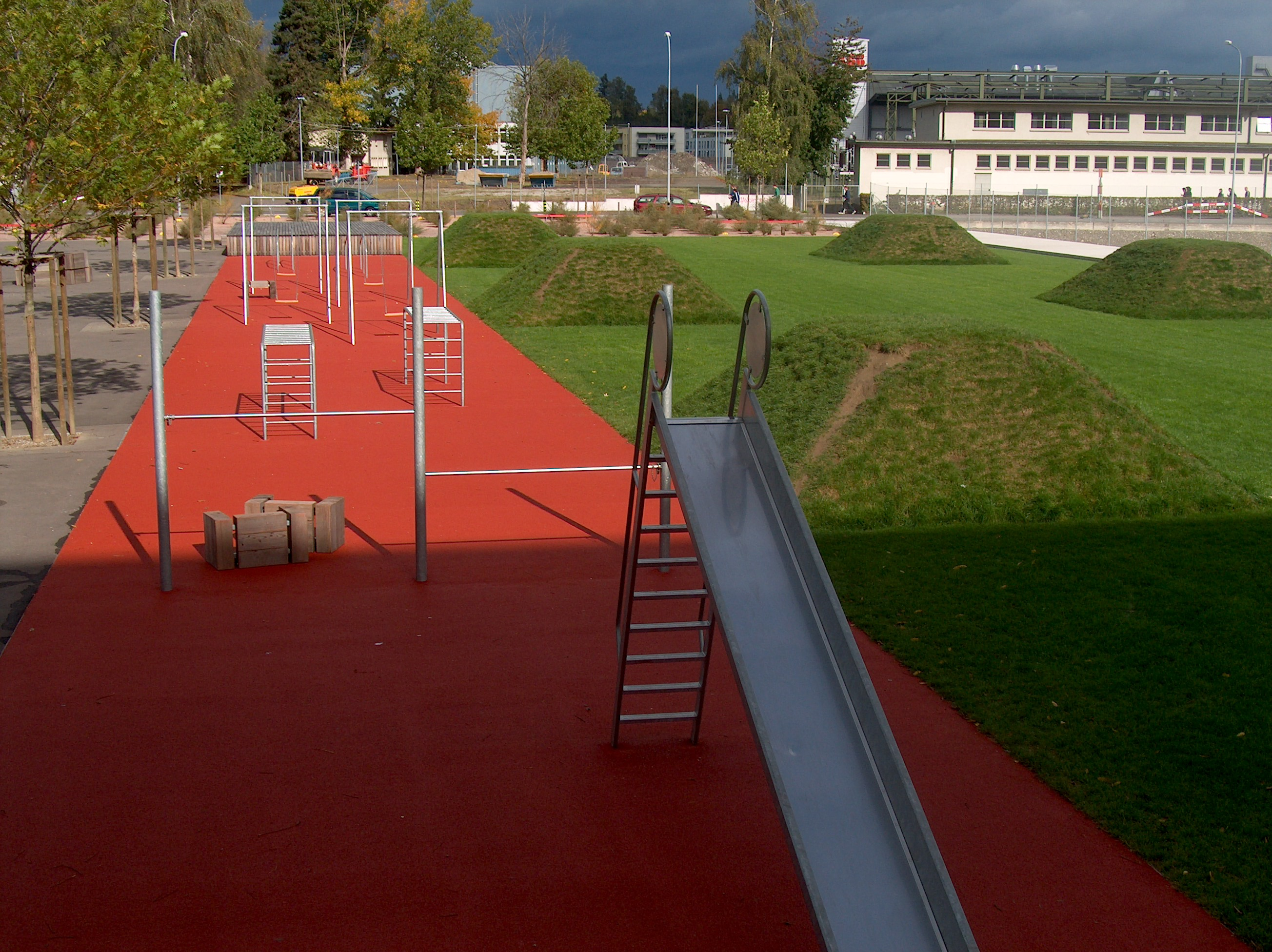
Playground at Louis-Häfliger-Park.

The Louis-Häfliger-Park in Oerlikon, Zurich, covers 5,000 m^{2} (53,820 sq ft) and is embedded between the Regina-Kägi-Hof co-operative settlement, the existing production buildings for Oerlikon-Contraves AG, and new service buildings. It is a neighbourhood park allowing people who live or work here to relax and meet. The park is named after Louis Haefliger (1904–1993), "Saviour of Mauthausen". He saved the lives of about 40,000 inmates of the Mauthausen concentration camp.

== Design ==
The project drafted by the project team Kuhn Truninger, Zurich / P. Wiedemann, Chur and C. Schubiger, Zurich and Hans H. Moser, Zurich was defined in a study assignment with preselection in 2000. Construction was started in 2002. Louis-Häfliger-Park was handed over to the population in an opening ceremony in 2003 after 10 months of construction. The design concept was based on the abolition of borders between the park, industry, and residential areas. The proposal by landscape architects Kuhn Truninger is therefore based on dissolving the boundaries between these elements. Similar to a patchwork quilt composed of different pieces, the various fields meet and are united into one whole. Different fields generate a diverse space. The park refers to its environment in its materialization, form, and size. The surprising proximity of the fields and the wingnut trees create locations with a special character. In heavy rain, precipitation water temporarily dams up above the flat retention hopper and builds reflecting surfaces. This indicates the high ground water level, which is only about 80 cm below the surface.

Eight grass pyramids in the lawn reveal aspects of the local history. They form the quasi pro-turbances of the conspicuous lawn funnels of the former ammunition huts. The park's patchwork is complemented with a band of play equipment for toddlers, a blue sports pitch for ball games and a timber stage.
