= Wahlenpark =

Public park in New Oerlikon in Zurich

Coordinates: 47°24′57″N 8°32′28″E

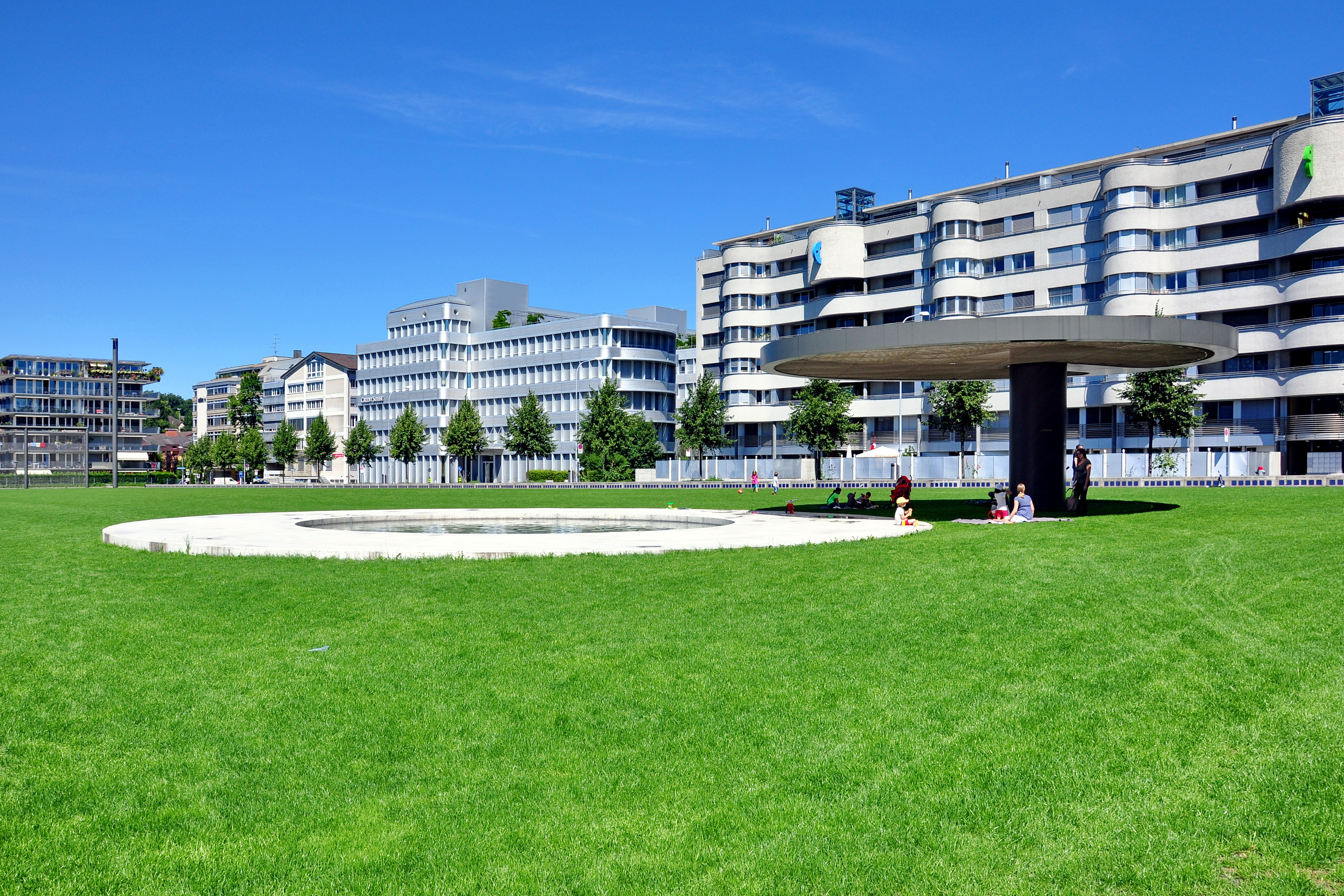
Wahlenpark in Zürich-Oerlikon

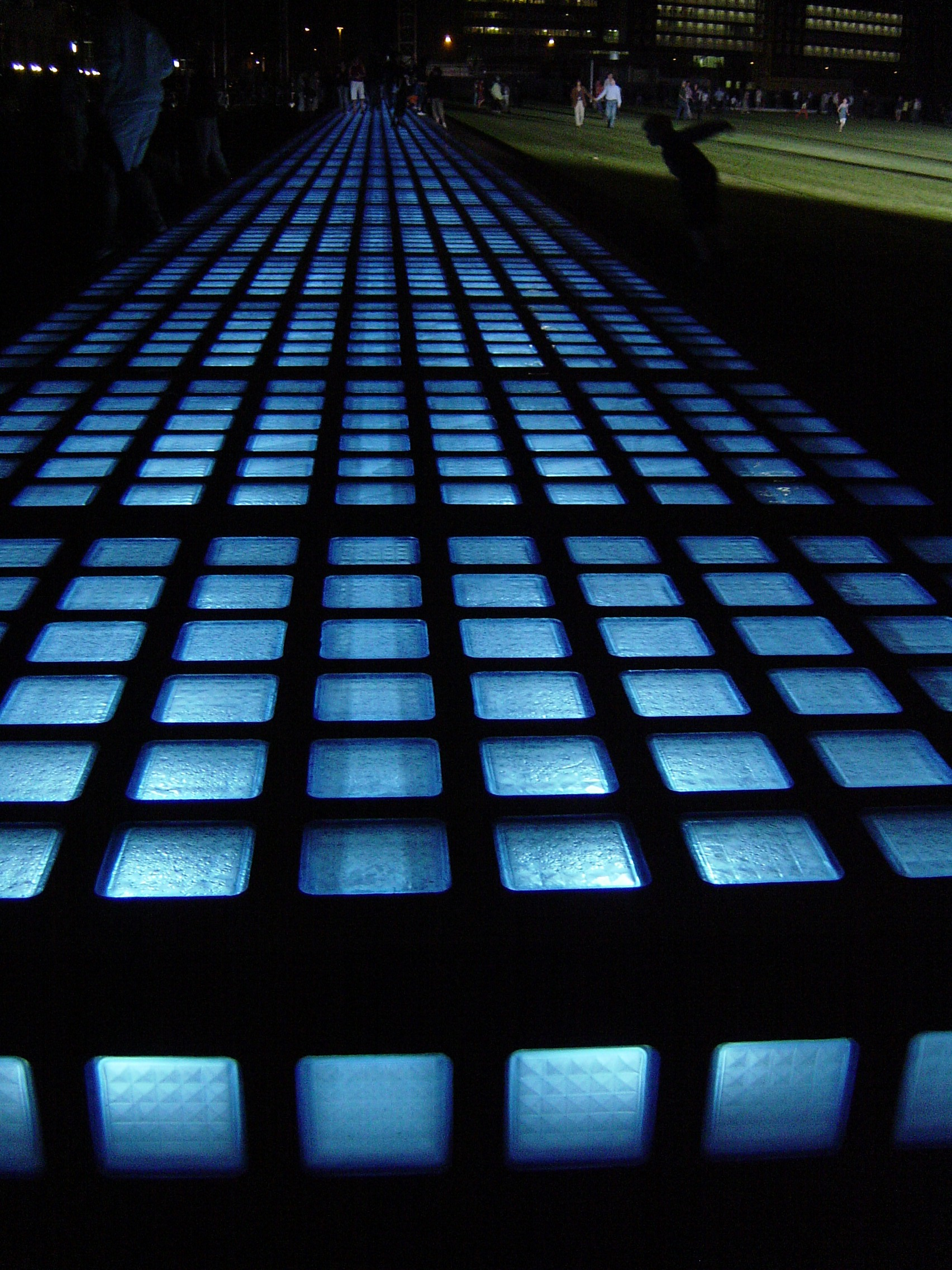
The lit blue colour seats at nighttime.

The Wahlenpark is a public park in New Oerlikon in the northern part of Zurich. The park covers 139,931 ft². It was created in 2005 as part of the regional development "Zentrum Zürich Nord", as the last of four parks. The architects envisaged a multi-functional space for play and movement to be used by local residents and young people from the nearby school.

== Development ==
The Wahlenpark was handed over to the population with an opening ceremony in June 2005. The park’s name commemorates Friedrich Traugott Wahlen (1899–1985), the agronomist and later federal councillor, who lived in Zurich’s Oerlikon district. The project, which was drafted by the planning company Dipol Landscape Architects, Basel / Christopher T. Hunziker, Zurich in cooperation with the engineering company Hans H. Moser, Zurich was selected in an internationally advertised competition. In 2004, the construction of the park started with a full clean-up of the contaminated sites.

== Design ==
The park, which is part of the urban and open space development in Oerlikon, consists of three areas: the trees, the playing field, and the promenade. The volume of the trees opposite the school and the promenade, which is lined with linden trees, define the elongated, wide space in the centre of the park. This size, which is unique in this district of the city, is accentuated by the flat playing field. Seven different beech tree species are lined up to an alley in a manner reminiscent of ancient British garden design.

The generous park lawns invite you to take part in sport and games, to paddle in the water basin, and to take a stroll in the beech woods. The playing field, which is uncharacteristically open for the surrounding area, compromises four distinct functional elements: a vast sculpt-tural lighting mast, a robust ball stop net, a paddling pool with a wide concrete rim and a shade structure, all of which offer a contrast to the monochrome lawn. At night, the 160 m long seats are lit in a romantic blue colour with 7000 glass stones and change the park into a fairytale place.
