= Quaianlagen (Zurich) =

Series of lakefronts in Switzerland

- Quaysides and Urban park
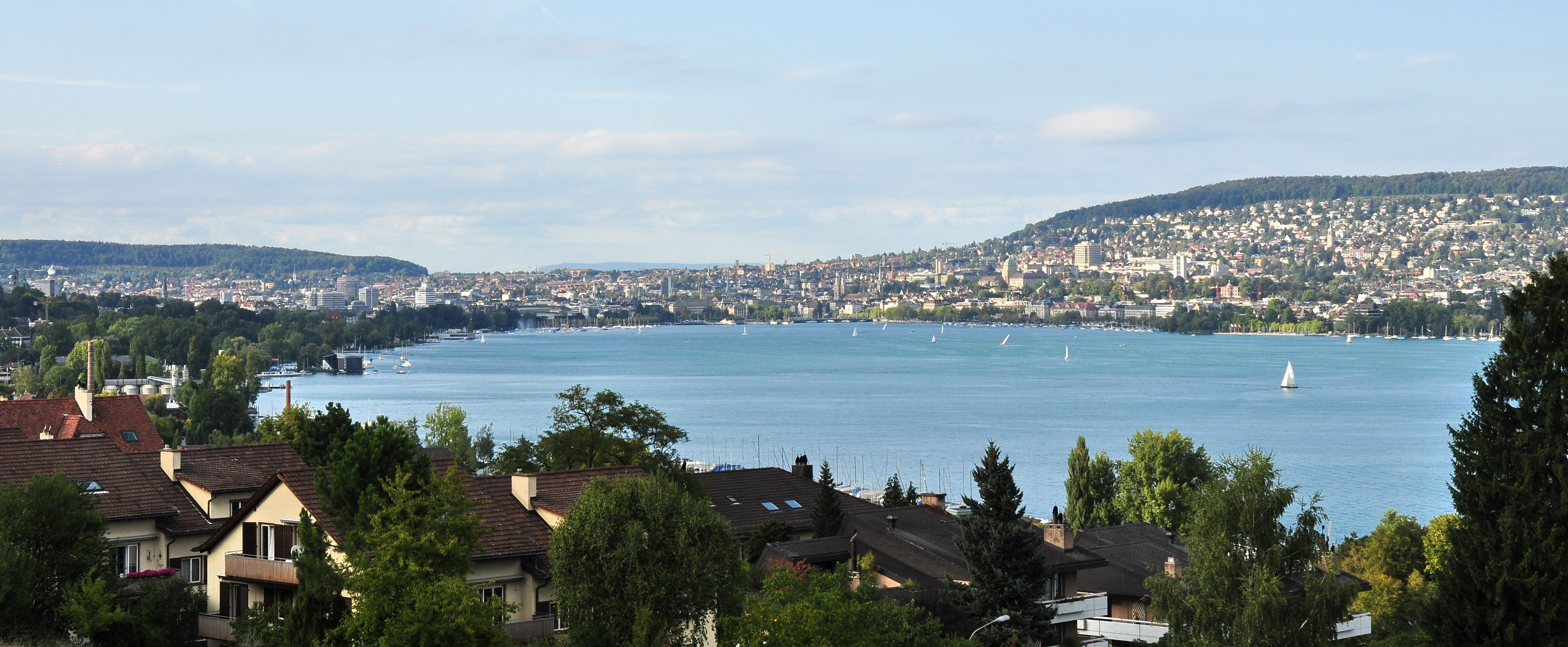
- Lake Zurich's lower lake basin, looking north from Wollishofen towards the inner city of Zurich (August 2011)
- Design: Arnold Bürkli
- Constructed: 1881–1887
- Opened: Open all year
- Length: about 3 kilometres (1.9 mi)
- Owner: City of Zurich
- Manager: Grün Stadt Zürich
- Location: Zurich, Switzerland
- Interactive map of Quaianlagen
- Coordinates: 47°21′49″N 8°32′11″E

Quaianalagen (German, plural; English: quays, or quaysides; from French: des quais) or Seeuferanlagen (German, plural for lakeshore sites) on Lake Zurich is a series of lakefronts in Zurich, Switzerland. Inaugurated in 1887, the quaysides are considered an important milestone in the development of Zurich. The construction of the lake fronts transformed the medieval small town on the rivers Limmat and Sihl to a modern city on the Lake Zurich shore. The project was managed by engineer Arnold Bürkli.

== Geography ==
The quays are situated in the districts of Enge, Seefeld and Wollishofen at the lower Lake Zurich shore within the city of Zurich. The complete construction includes, among others, the central Bürkliplatz on the outflow of the Lake Zurich, and (from west to east coast) Saffa-Insel, Strandbad Mythenquai, Belvoirpark, Mythenquai, Arboretum, General-Guisan-Quai, Sechseläutenplatz, Utoquai, Seebad Utoquai, Seefeldquai, Riesbach Harbour, Centre Le Corbusier, Blatterwiese, Chinagarten, Zürichhorn and Strandbad Tiefenbrunnen.

Two of the prehistoric pile dwellings around Lake Zurich with UNESCO World Heritage status are located in Zurich: Alpenquai and Kleiner Hafner.

== Further points of interests ==
=== Blatterwiese ===
Blatterwiese is a wide and popular neighborhood meadow situated between Seefeldquai and Zürichhorn, established in 1839 as an industrial area, it has since then also been used as on open public lido. In 1926, the city government acquired the land and broke down the factory building. In 1939, it was the site of the Swiss National Exhibition Landi39, and was also used for the G59 exhibition in 1959. After the horticultural exhibition, the open parkland was taken over by the city government and transformed to a large playground. Between Blatterwiese and Bellerivestrasse, in 1993, the Chinese Garden Zurich was inaugurated. The new Spielplatz Blatterwiese began construction in October 2006 and opened in June 2007. Coordinated with the transformation of the adjacent playground, the former partially underground cable car station of the G59 exhibition was rebuilt with a ZüriWC public toilet. The Centre Le Corbusier (or Heidi Weber Museum), an art museum dedicated to the work of the Swiss architect Le Corbusier, is situated opposite of the playground.

=== General-Guisan-Quai ===
The Alpenquai on the left bank – renamed General-Guisan-Quai after Henri Guisan in 1960 – was created as a terrace-like promenade for the urban population, and four rows of trees were planted. On occasion of the renovation in 2003, the 20th century asphalt-covered surfaces were restored to the original gravel pathways. The original trees, three rows of double-flowered Aesculus hippocastanum Baumannii, significantly characterize the appearance of the place. To maintain the same basket-like crown as the elderly chestnut, the young trees are capped at their historical model of the main trunk and the runners are moved to the desired quirl-like crown. In combination with the intervening series of trumpet trees of the species Catalpa bignonioides and Catalpa ovata, the image of a compact roof tree is achieved.

Works of art from three generations adorn this path segment: the sculpture of Ganymede by Hermann Hubacher (1959) on the so-called Bürkliterrasse (named after Arnold Bürkli) at Quaibrücke ; the fountain bowl of pink concrete by Christoph Haerle (2003, popularly known as female Ganymede); and the mosaic fountain by Alfred F. Bluntschli (1903) to the east at the Arobetum.

=== Hafen Enge ===
The Hafen Enge, meaning the harbour area in Enge, is situated between the Arboretum and Strandbad Mythenquai. The harbour itself is used as a private-owned marina. There is a restaurant, Quai61, and a very popular snack bar at the parking facility adjoining the Arboretum, also housing a ZüriWC. The harbour is in three sections, beginning at the Arboretum. At the parking facility and towards the Mythenquai there are four boathouses, typically for members; on the parking facility at the Mythenquai lido, it is permitted to park private boats in the winter season. The most popular sculpture there is the so-called Züri-Leu, a colossal statue of a lion (renewed in 2013), situated at the publicly accessible wave-breaker.

=== Hafen Riesbach ===
The Hafen Riesbach, or Riesbach harbour area, is situated between Seefeldquai and Blatterwiese. The harbour is used as a private-owned marina. In 2004, the old kiosk at the popular open lido at Riesbachstrasse was replaced by a building with a windowed face. The new polygonal pavilion was designed by the architects Andreas Furrimann and Gabrielle Hächler, and now houses a small restaurant and an annexed ZüriWC public toilet. The colour of the windows is reflected by the surroundings, and the pavilion is illuminated in the evening hours. The original seawall front is 200 metres (656 ft) long, and was renovated in 2003 and 2006 but not fully renewed due to risk of collapse; thus the natural stone dry wall was rebuilt in the same way. The Seefeldquai is an important milestone in the work of the landscape architect Willi Neukom, as it combines park designs from different design periods. The stone pillar Klausstud originally stood in the lake and served as a border designation of the medieval right of bann (boundary) of the city republic of Zurich. It marked where fishing rights of the urban fishermen ended, and from here the Einsiedeln Abbey pilgrims proved their honour to the Protestant city by lowering the volume of their prayers and songs. Since the landfills in the construction of the quais, the pillar stands in the middle of the park. The sculpture by Henry Moore is named Sheep Piece, and was donated in 1976.

=== Landiwiese ===
Named after the Landi39 exhibition, various public events continue to be held here. These include the camp of the Circus Knie when it stages at Sechseläutenplatz, numerous youth events, Zürcher Theater Spektakel, the SAFFA (Swiss Exhibition for Women's Work) in 1958, and the popular artificial island Saffa-Insel that is connected by a small bridge for thousands of people who like to swim or have fun there. Landiwiese includes a large open meadow with a smaller hard court for sports, and is home to valuable old trees. The festival site is part of the last replenishment on the left lake shore; in 1939, it was named for the Swiss National Exhibition (Landesausstellung), and expanded to its present size. Mädchen mit erhobenen Händen is the most remarkable sculpture at the area and is a work by Hermann Haller, created in 1939.

=== Mythenquai ===
Otto C. Banninger's Gottfried Keller memorial (1964) is situated at the Wabengarten, a honeycomb water installation, one of the few relics of the 1959 garden exhibition, G59. It had been constructed for a temporary exhibition, so reductions for bad foundations and water loss occurred in the less-dense pools. A few steps from the shore there's another rare plant in Zurich, Taxodium distichum having pneumatophores, originating from Mississippi River up to Missouri. At the marina, Alnus glutinosa were planted after the flood of May 1999, and because the high water table in the vicinity of the lake gets better than their commitments, a group of Paulownia tomentosa. In 2004 the city council (Stadtrat, Zurich's executive organ) decided to develop a master plan for this area of the lakeside promenades. Because the adjacent lake police (Wasserschutzpolizei der Stadt Zürich) planned a new building, and the public access to Mythenquai had to be reorganized, a general upgrading and redevelopment of the whole area was planned, extending to the parking facilities and Strandbad Mythenquai, Zurich 's only sand-beach lido.

=== Seefeldquai ===
The Seefeldquai consists of the popular and historic promenade between Utoquai and Feldeggstrasse at the lakeside environment of the 1970s, leading to Lindenstrasse, opposite of the Mythenquai. It is the southernly extension of the long promenades from Utoquai, having a mix of beaches with sand and gravel areas. Due to fluctuations in the water level, some shore sections had to be secured with boulders. The upright stone pillar Klausstud, named after Saint Nicholas, was the former Bann (boundary) of the medieval city of Zurich, situated near the Riesbach harbour. The 1864-built bathhouse was closed in 1887, but as a substitute of the former Riesbach local authorities approved the construction of two new baths, Strandbad Tiefenbrunnen and Seebad Utoquai. From 1975 to 1977, the waterfront between Feldeggstrasse and Lindenstrasse was redesigned by the landscape architect Willi Neukom. The park was designed with pools, hills and sandstone blocks, and smooth transitions to the private property in the present Seefeld district. The curved routing at the Utoquai roadway, one of the busiest in Zurich, has been set in deliberate contrast to the orthogonal orientation of the paths towards Zürichhorn and Blatterwiese, and was paved with period-typical hexagonal stones. The trees have been integrated into the new design and supplemented with unusual flora, such as beech and hanging pyramidal elms, rhododendrons and azaleas, additional shrub and rose plantings, irises, grasses, and bamboo. In 1999, it was replaced by a more transparent planting, and in 2007, the park area was again upgraded with rose plants.

=== Utoquai ===
The Utoquai is situated between the influx of the river Limmat and Bellevueplatz (respectively the Sechseläutenplatz (Kleiner Hafner) squares), with the Seefeldquai adjoining to the southeast. The promenade was built in 1887 and planted with chestnut trees as a lawn towards the Seebad Utoquai. It was formed as a high seawall with a wrought iron railing, and small stairs leading to the lake's shore. Traffic planners urged a masterplan be developed in the 1960s, which called for the adjacent Bellerivestrasse to be broadened due to the rapidly growing road traffic. The historic lakeside promenade was to be shifted, and construction implemented in 1971 effected a new promenade on concrete piles directly above the water level. However, the project plans were not fully realized, and the waterside path of the 1970s became an additional part of the existing promenades, preserving the chestnut trees of 1887 and resulting in the present, wide promenade. In 2006, the historic seawall was renewed, and the Utoquai's design is now of different time periods. As the old bathhouse had to make place for the construction, the then-independent municipality Riesbach built two new bathing facilities: Strandbad Tiefenbrunnen (1886) and Seebad Utoquai (1890). The latter was a "bathing palace" on stilts with delicate, tower-like structures in the Moorish style. For the first time in Zurich, it was permitted for men and women to bathe in the same place. In 1942, the towering domes were enhanced by the construction of wooden sun terraces, and the basic structure of the original bathing room is still preserved. The Utoquai figures in Inventar der schützenswerten Gärten und Anlagen von kommunaler Bedeutung, being the inventory of estimable gardens and grounds of local importance that was established in 1989.

== History ==
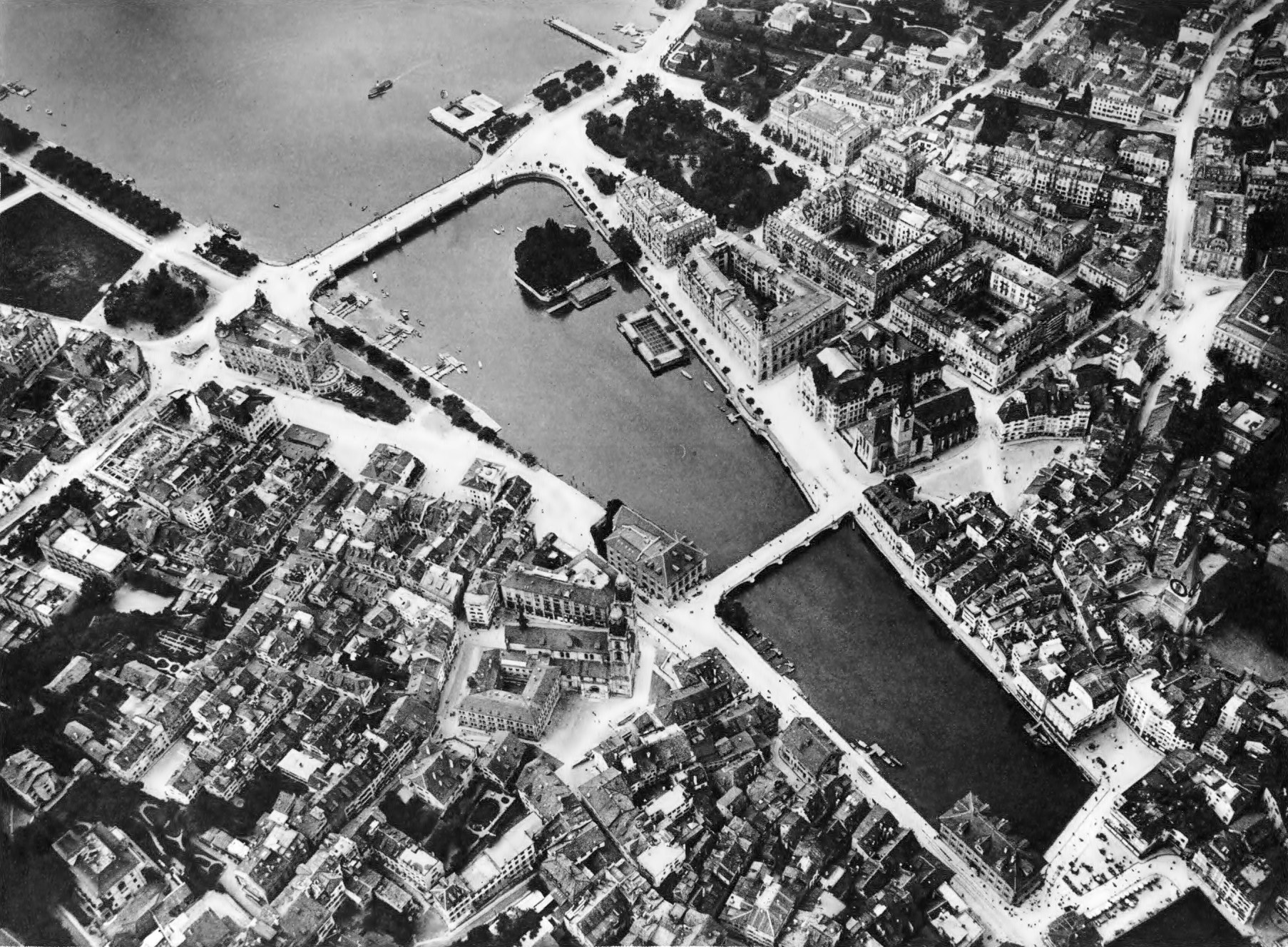
Bellevueplatz, Quaibrücke, Bürkliplatz, Bauschänzli, Münsterbrücke, Rathausbrücke, and Weinplatz (aerial photograph by Eduard Spelterini, probably late 1890s)

The site of the former Kratzquartier accommodation and Bauhaus district at the Bauschänzli (today's Stadthausanlage) was extended in 1833 by landfill with rubble of the baroque city fortification along the lake shore. This also marked the end of the medieval Kratzquartier as the distinctive urban axis, extending from Zentralhof, Kappelerhof, and Münsterhof towards the Bürkliterrasse, once home to the underprivileged citizens of Zurich. The medieval quarter had been thoroughly overhauled between 1836 and 1900, and was entirely demolished for the purpose of building a modern lakeshore city.

The population welcomed the decision of the city of Zurich and the independent municipalities of Enge and Riesbach to construct the planned lakeside promenades on 4 September 1881. The project, which comprised the whole lower lake basin by the Zürichhorn close to the Enge port, was a considerable financial risk for the three communities that were involved. Smart financing models and the "unwavering optimism of the early years brilliantly mastered this challenge".

The large-scale land reclamation works began in the area of Utoquai in the 1860s, requiring a total of 24.1 million cubic meters (850 million cu ft) of stone material and lake mud for an area of about 200,000 square metres (49 acres). This was brought in by ship and introduced by machines specially designed for this purpose. The typical procedure was to construct a breakwater and then backfill it with less-stable lake marl. Railway construction and excavations of tunnels and cuts in Riesbach also provided material, and municipalities and private organizations were invited to deposit rubble, being compensated for large quantities.

Arnold Bürkli-Ziegler gave up his position as city engineer to be the chief engineer and coordinator of the project. The construction work began in late 1881, with plans to present parts of the quays at the Swiss national exhibition of 1883. But the whole coastal zone had to be transformed in a time-consuming and costly process in public ownership. Previously, nearly the entire lake area was inaccessible to the public, as the shore land belonged to private owners.

The inauguration was held in July 1887, and Quaibrücke became the link between the left (Limmat downstream or southerly) and right side of the lake. The elegant promenade of Utoquai, Bürkliterrasse (Alpenquai), and the General-Guisan-Quai lined up on the right side of the lake. The Arboretum, as a spacious park facility, became the southerly connection towards Mythenquai and present Wollishofen.

The Swiss National Exhibition in 1939 initiated the further extensions of the existing plan. A monorail was built between the two shores of the lake, but was taken down shortly after the exhibition. At Zürichhorn, the popular tourist restaurant Casino Zürichhorn was removed temporarily to provide space for the buildings of the exhibition, one of which was preserved as the Fischerstube restaurant. In the 1950s, on the fallow area between the railway station Tiefenbrunnen and Zürichhorn, the Seebad Tiefenbrunnen lido was erected; in the 1960s, the new building of the restaurant Lakeside and the Centre Le Corbusier were built. As part of the horticultural exhibition 1959 (G59), Seefeldquai underwent important changes: the present natural embankment design in the English landscape style between Riesbach harbour and Zürichhorn, the removal of nearly century-old trees, and the replacement of all embankments with sandstone slabs and stones. In the mid-1960s, at the height of the Riesbachstrasse harbour area, some owners sold their property at Seefeldquai; in its place emerged several corporate offices and the private clinic Seepyramyde. The last extension was the Chinagarten Zürich at Zürichhorn.

== Literature ==
- Gartenbiografien: Orte erzählen. vdf Hochschulverlag AG, ETH Zürich, Zurich 2013, ISBN 978-3-7281-3579-7.
- Roman G. Schönauer: Von der Stadt am Fluss zur Stadt am See. 100 Jahre Zürcher Quaianlagen. Verlag Matthieu (Zürcher Heimatschutz), published by Stadtrat, Zurich 1987/2006, ISBN .
