= Seebad Utoquai =

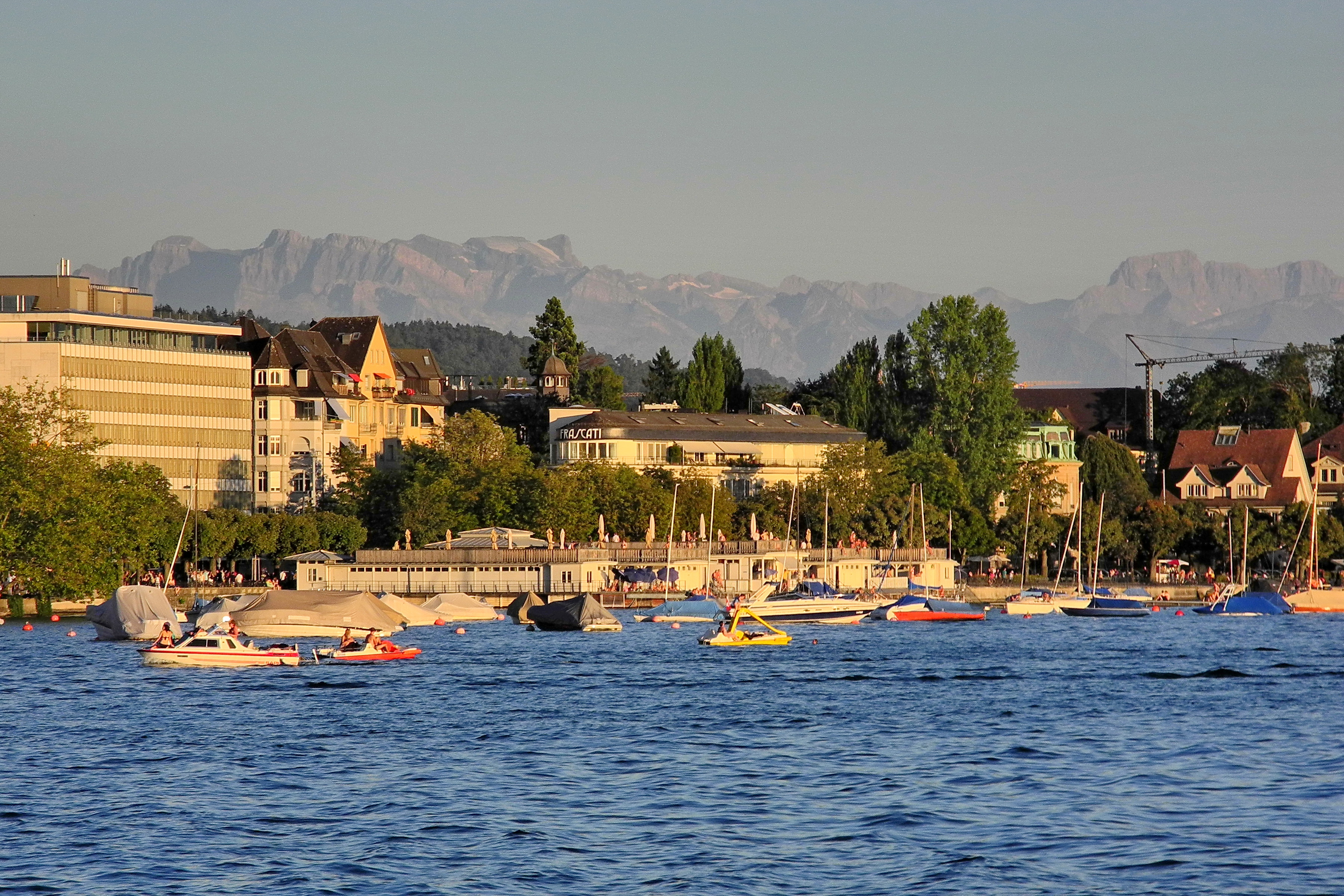
- Seebad Utoquai as seen from Quaibrücke in Zürich
- Interactive map of Seebad Utoquai
- Location: Utoquai, Zürich, CH-8008
- Coordinates: 47.36186°N 8.547305°E
- Operator: City of Zürich
- Type: public bath; lake bath
- Facilities: gym, sauna, crèche, kiosk, Ayurveda
- Dimensions: Length: about 90 metres (295 ft); Width: about 30 metres (98 ft); Depth: 4 metres (13 ft)

Construction
- Opened: 1890

Website
- Official website (in German)

Seebad Utoquai is a public bath in the Swiss municipality of Zürich, being part of the historical Seeuferanlage promenades that were built between 1881 and 1887.

== Geography ==
The bath is situated at Utoquai respectively in the Seefeld quarter at the Zürichsee lake shore on the right bank. Public transport is provided by the VBZ transport company by the tram lines 11 and 15, bus lines 33 and postauto bus lines 912 and 916 to Chinagarten Zürich stop. It is situated opposite of Strandbad Mythenquai on the other bank of the lower Zürichsee lake shore in Zürich.

== History and description ==
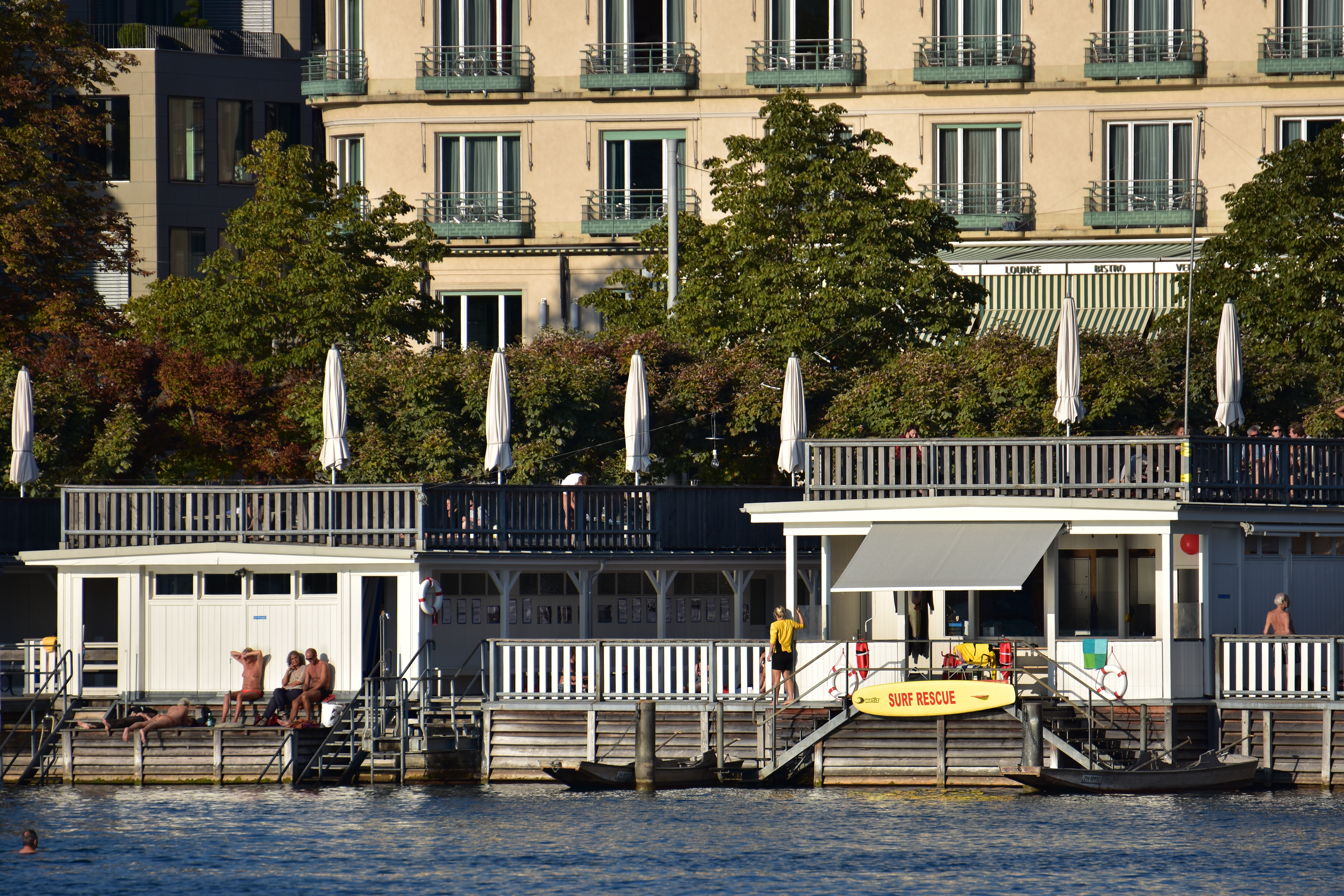
Detail view of the wooden construction and access to the lake as seen from Zürichsee-Schifffahrtsgesellschaft (ZSG) ship MS Helvetia

As the old bathhouse had to make place for the construction of quais, the then independent municipality of Riesbach built two new bathing facilities Strandbad Tiefenbrunnen (1886) and Seebad Utoquai (1890). For the latter, a bathing palace on stilts with delicate, tower-like structures in the Moorish style was implemented. For the first time in Zürich, it was allowed to men and women to bathe in the same bath. In 1942 the towering domes were added by sun terraces, also in a wooden construction, were built, and the basic structure of the original bathroom is still preserved. The Utoquai figures in Inventar der schützenswerten Gärten und Anlagen von kommunaler Bedeutung, being the inventory of estimable gardens and grounds of local importance that was established in 1989.

== Cultural heritage ==
The structure is listed in the Swiss inventory of cultural property of national and regional significance as an object of regional importance.

== See also ==
- Utoquai
- Quaianlagen
