= Strandbad Mythenquai =

Public bath in Zurich, Switzerland

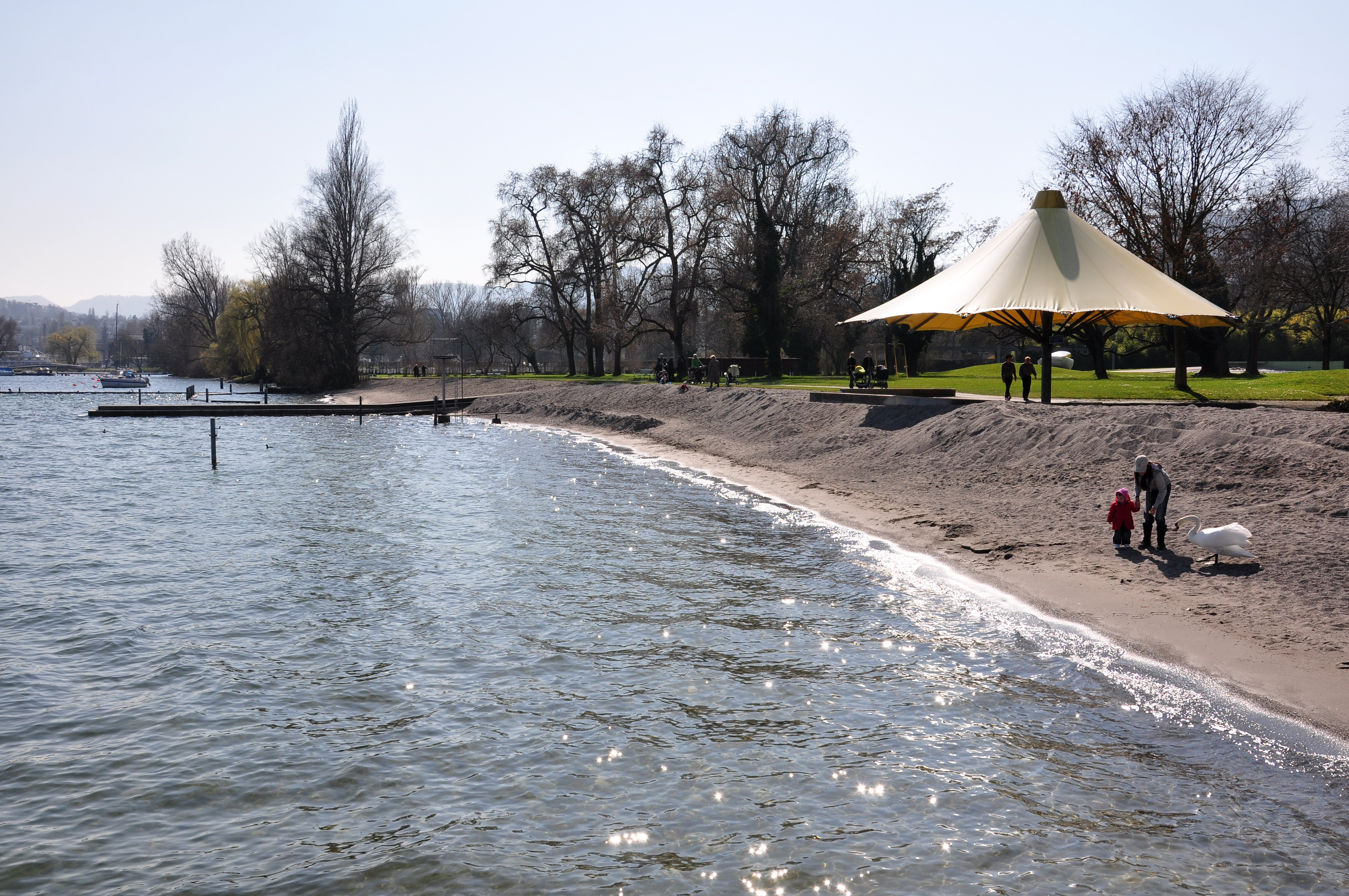
- Strandbad Mythenquai at Mythenquai in Zürich
- Interactive map of Strandbad Mythenquai
- Location: Mythenquai 95, Zürich, CH-8002
- Coordinates: 47.353958°N 8.536071°E
- Operator: City of Zürich
- Type: public bath; lake bath
- Facilities: gym, crèche, kiosk, playground
- Dimensions: Length: about 400 metres (1,312 ft); Width: about 100 metres (328 ft); Depth: 4 metres (13 ft)

Construction
- Opened: 1922

Website
- Official website (in German)

Strandbad Mythenquai is a public bath in the Swiss municipality of Zürich, being part of the historical Seeuferanlage promenades that were built between 1881 and 1887.

== Geography ==
The bath is situated at Mythenquai respectively between the Enge and Wollishofen quarters at lower the Zürichsee lake shore on the left bank in Zürich. Public transport is provided by the VBZ transport company by the tram line 7 (stop Brunaustrasse), the bus lines 161 and 165 to Sukkulentensammlung stop, and the Zürichsee-Schifffahrtsgesellschaft tour boats towards Seerestaurant, as well as by the ZVV S-Bahn lines S8 and S24 towards Wollishofen train station.

== History and description ==
As the old bathhouse had to make place for the construction of the so-called Seeuferanlage promenade, the then independent municipality of Riesbach built two new bathing facilities – Strandbad Tiefenbrunnen (1886) at Zürichhorn and Seebad Utoquai (1890) at Utoquai – on the other bank of the Zürichsee lake shore. Opened in spring 1922, the Mythenquai lido was visited by up to 11,000 visitors a day, then gender separated by wall boards that were broken a few years later. A ten-meter-high (33 ft) water slide was installed in 1927 in the still present family-oriented lido. During the World War II, grains and vegetables were planted in the spacious area. In 1951 a fire destroyed the bathroom so far that the city of Zürich decided to build a new one. As in the early years, the sandy beach is still very popular and a unique feature in the Zürich baths.

In 1976 the restaurant building complex was added. An architectural competition in 2011 for a new concept failed. In the 2014 season, the Mythenquai lido was rebuilt for about CHF 7.5 million, and the popular grass strip on the sandy beach gave way to a more spacious sandy surface, but it also was replaced by a concrete construction. Two old trees were felled, 25 new trees were planted. The big, yellow umbrellas – the landmark of the Seebadi since 1976 – were removed. The restaurant was replaced by a new construction on the edge of the bath, and was designed as a 1950s style pavilion, also housing vegetarian menues.

== Cultural heritage ==
The garden area is open to the public in the Winter season. The structure is listed in the Swiss inventory of cultural property of national and regional significance as an object of regional importance.

== See also ==
- Mythenquai
- Quaianlagen
