= Quaibrücke =

A Quaibrücke, or Quai-Brücke, or Quai Brücke (German, from French: quai) is a German term for quay bridge. Commonly used in German language and is sometimes even used as a name of such bridges in some places:

- Switzerland:
  - Quaibrücke in Zurich.
  - Alternative name for Seebrücke bridge in Lucerne.
