= Museum für Gestaltung Zürich =

Design museum in Zurich, Switzerland

- Former name: Kunstgewerbemuseum Zürich
- Established: 1875
- Location: Zürich, Switzerland
- Type: Design museum
- Website: museum-gestaltung.ch/en

Museum für Gestaltung Zürich (English: Museum of Design Zurich) is a design museum in Zürich, Switzerland. The museum operates exhibition venues at Ausstellungsstrasse and Toni-Areal and manages the Pavillon Le Corbusier on behalf of the City of Zürich.

Founded in 1875 as the Kunstgewerbemuseum Zürich (Museum of Arts and Crafts Zurich), the institution is dedicated to design, visual communication and the applied arts.

The museum's collections comprise more than 580,000 physical, hybrid and digital objects related to design culture.

== History ==
The museum originated from the Museum of Decorative Arts of the City of Zurich (Kunstgewerbemuseum Zürich), founded in 1875.

From 1898 to 1933, the museum was housed in the Swiss National Museum.

In 1933, the museum and the School of Arts and Crafts, the predecessor institution of the Zurich University of the Arts, moved into a purpose-built building on Ausstellungsstrasse designed by Adolf Steger and Karl Egender.

In 1968, the museum opened a second location, Museum Bellerive, on Lake Zurich.

In 2000, responsibility for the museum was transferred from the City of Zürich to the Canton of Zürich.

A second exhibition venue was opened at Toni-Areal in 2014. At the same time, all four collections were brought together under one roof and the historic Ausstellungsstrasse building closed for renovation.

Following extensive renovation works, the Ausstellungsstrasse building reopened in March 2018.

Since May 2019, the museum has operated the Pavillon Le Corbusier as a public museum on behalf of the City of Zürich.

In 2025, the museum marked its 150th anniversary.

== Locations ==
=== Ausstellungsstrasse ===
The historic main building near Zürich Hauptbahnhof hosts temporary exhibitions, collection presentations and public programmes.

=== Toni-Areal ===
Opened in 2014, the Toni-Areal venue forms part of a cultural campus shared with the Zurich University of the Arts. It accommodates exhibitions, archives, research activities and collection facilities.

=== Pavillon Le Corbusier ===
The Pavillon Le Corbusier, located on the shore of Lake Zurich, is the final architectural work designed by Le Corbusier. Museum für Gestaltung Zürich has managed the building on behalf of the City of Zürich since 2019.

== Collections ==
The museum maintains four principal collections:

- Design Collection
- Graphics Collection
- Poster Collection
- Applied Arts Collection

With more than 580,000 physical, hybrid and digital objects, the museum holds Switzerland's largest collection dedicated to design culture.

The collections document the history of graphics, industrial design, product design, typography, visual communication and applied arts from the nineteenth century to the present.

=== Design Collection ===
The Design Collection preserves industrial products, household objects, packaging and examples of Swiss and international design culture.

=== Graphics Collection ===
The Graphics Collection contains material relating to graphic design, typography, illustration and visual communication.

=== Poster Collection ===
The Poster Collection documents the development of Swiss and international poster design and is of international significance.

=== Applied Arts Collection ===
The Applied Arts Collection includes ceramics, glass, textiles, metalwork and other objects associated with decorative and applied arts.

== Research ==
As part of the Zurich University of the Arts, the museum participates in research and teaching activities related to design, visual culture and collection-based scholarship.

Large parts of the collections are accessible through the museum's digital platforms, including its eMuseum database.

== Exhibitions and public programmes ==
The museum organises temporary exhibitions, collection presentations and touring exhibitions focused on design, visual communication, architecture, photography and applied arts.

According to the museum, seven to nine new exhibitions are presented annually across its venues.

The museum also provides educational programmes, guided tours, workshops, lectures and other public events.

== See also ==
- Pavillon Le Corbusier
- Zurich University of the Arts
- Swiss design
