= Strandbad Tiefenbrunnen =

Public bath in Zurich, Switzerland

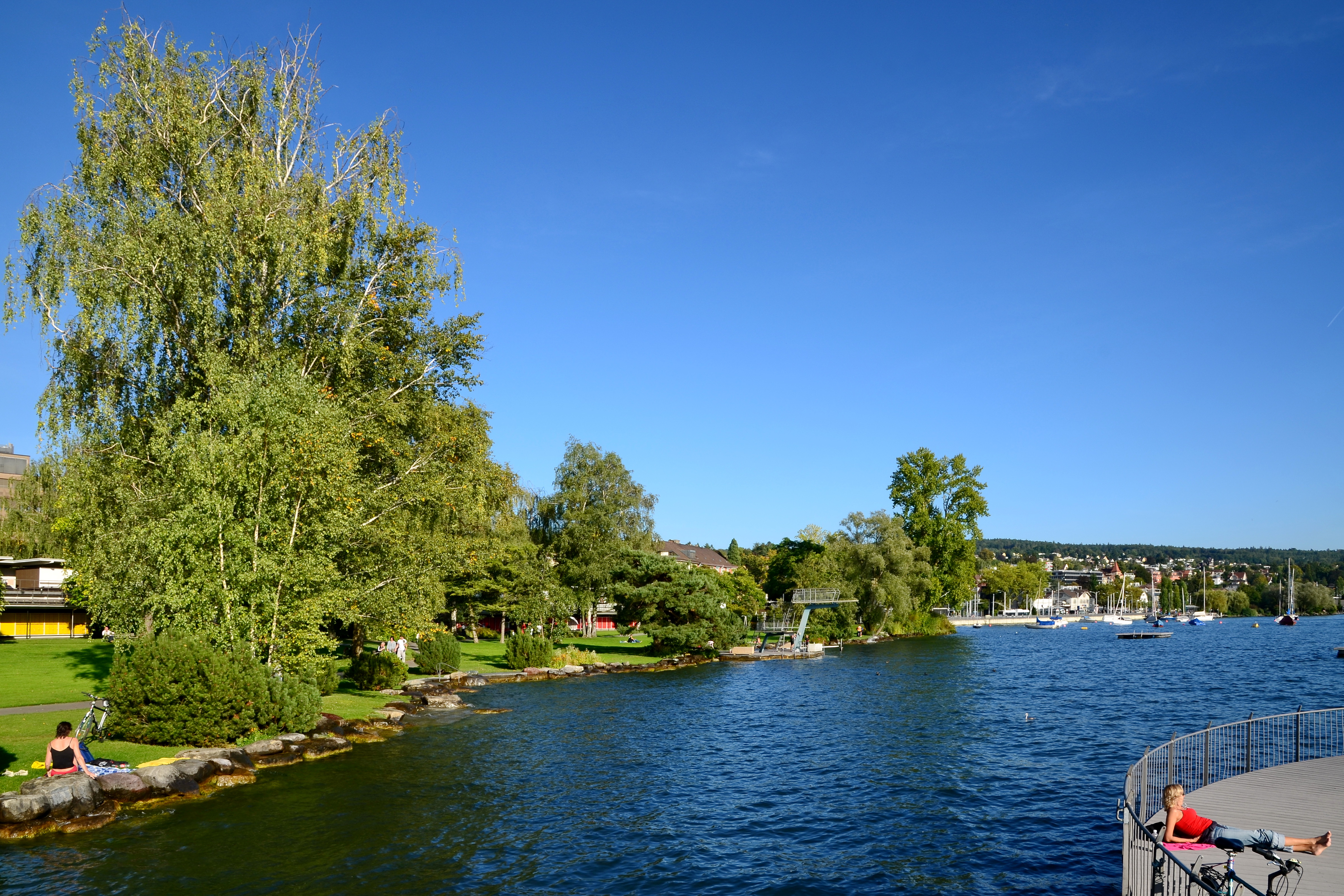
- Strandbad Tiefenbrunnen at Zürichhorn in Zürich
- Interactive map of Strandbad Tiefenbrunnen
- Location: Bellerivestrasse 200, Zürich, CH-8008
- Coordinates: 47.35284°N 8.556495°E
- Operator: City of Zürich
- Type: public bath; lake bath
- Facilities: gym, crèche, kiosk, playground, round swimming pool in the Zürichsee
- Dimensions: Length: about 300 metres (984 ft); Width: about 100 metres (328 ft); Depth: 4 metres (13 ft)

Construction
- Opened: 1886
- Architect: Joseph Schütz, Otto Dürr and Hans Nussbaumer

Website
- Official website (in German)

Strandbad Tiefenbrunnen is a public bath in the Swiss municipality of Zürich, being part of the historical Seeuferanlage promenades that were built between 1881 and 1887.

== Geography ==
The bath is situated at Zürichhorn respectively in the Seefeld quarter at the Zürichsee lake shore. Public transport is provided by the VBZ transport company by the tram lines 2 and 4, the bus lines 33 and the postauto bus lines 912 and 916 to Chinagarten Zürich stop, as well as by the Zürichsee-Schifffahrtsgesellschaft towards Zürichhorn.

== History and description ==
As the old bathhouse had to make place for the construction of quais, the then independent municipality of Riesbach built two new bathing facilities Strandbad Tiefenbrunnen (1886) at Zürichhorn, and Seebad Utoquai (1890) at Utoquai. The lido was rebuilt in the 1950s in the living garden style. The pavilion architecture and typical contemporary garden design were built by the architects Joseph Schütz, Otto Dürr and Hans Nussbaumer. Architectural eye-catchers of the resort are the teahouse with a panoramic terrace, and the main entrance, accented by circular concrete mushrooms and trees. The waterfront is fastened with large stones that are ideal for sitting. There are nudist sun terraces on the changing buildings, separated for men and women. The bath was rebuilt in 2011/12.

== Cultural heritage ==
The buildings and the gardens are listed in the inventory of monuments and preservation of historic gardens. The structure is listed in the Swiss inventory of cultural property of national and regional significance as an object of regional importance.

== See also ==
- Zürichhorn
- Quaianlagen
