= Pavillon Le Corbusier =

Biographical museum in Switzerland

Pavillon Le Corbusier (since May 2016) Centre Le Corbusier – Heidi Weber Museum (until April 2016)
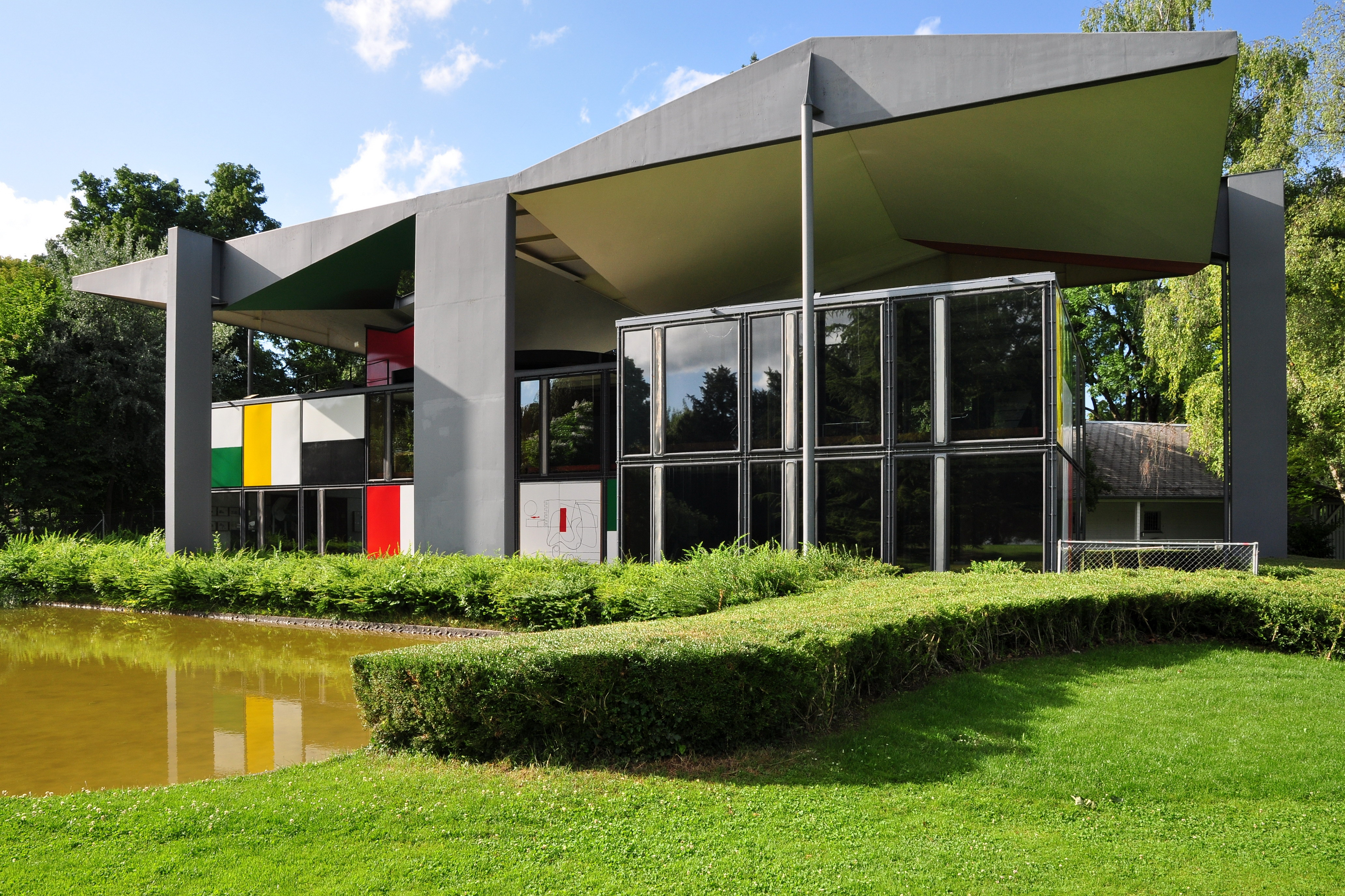
- Established: 1967
- Location: Zürichhorn, Switzerland
- Coordinates: 47°21′22.86″N 8°33′4.03″E
- Type: art and biographical museum dedicated to the work of Le Corbusier
- Founder: Heidi Weber
- Curators: Heidi Weber, Bernard Weber and Prof. Dr. Felix Richner

The Pavillon Le Corbusier is a Swiss art museum in Zürich-Seefeld at Zürichhorn dedicated to the work of the French-Swiss architect Le Corbusier. In 1960, Heidi Weber had the vision to establish a museum designed by Le Corbusier. The building was to exhibit his works of art in an ideal environment created by the architect himself. It was then named the Centre Le Corbusier or Heidi Weber Museum. In April 2014 the building and museum went over to the city of Zürich, and was renamed in May 2016.

== Location ==
The building is located on the Zürichsee lake shore nearby Zürichhorn in the Seefeld quarter. It can be reached by foot (20 minutes from Bellevueplatz–Sechseläutenplatz) or by public transportation: Trams 11 and 15 and bus line 33 to stops Höschgasse or Fröhlichstrasse, or bus lines 912 and 916 from Bellevue to Chinagarten, or by the Limmat boats operated by the Zürichsee-Schifffahrtsgesellschaft (ZSG) towards Zürichhorn.

== Centre Le Corbusier building ==
It is the last building designed by Le Corbusier marking a radical change of his achievement of using concrete and stone, framed in steel and glass, in the 1960s created as a signpost for the future. Le Corbusier made intensive use of prefabricated steel elements combined with multi-coloured enamelled plates fitted to the central core, and above the complex he designed a 'free-floating' roof to keep the house protected from the rain and the sun.

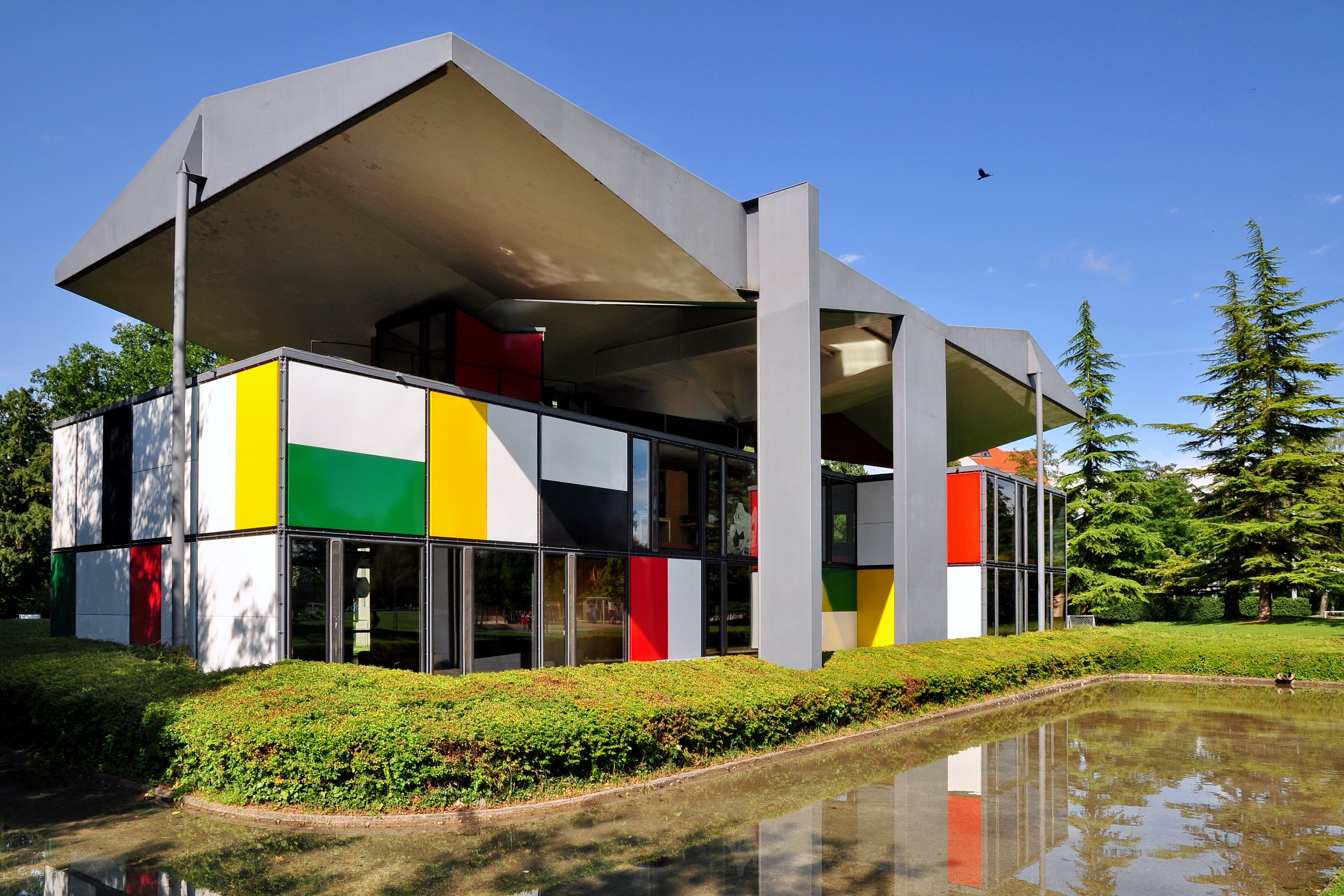

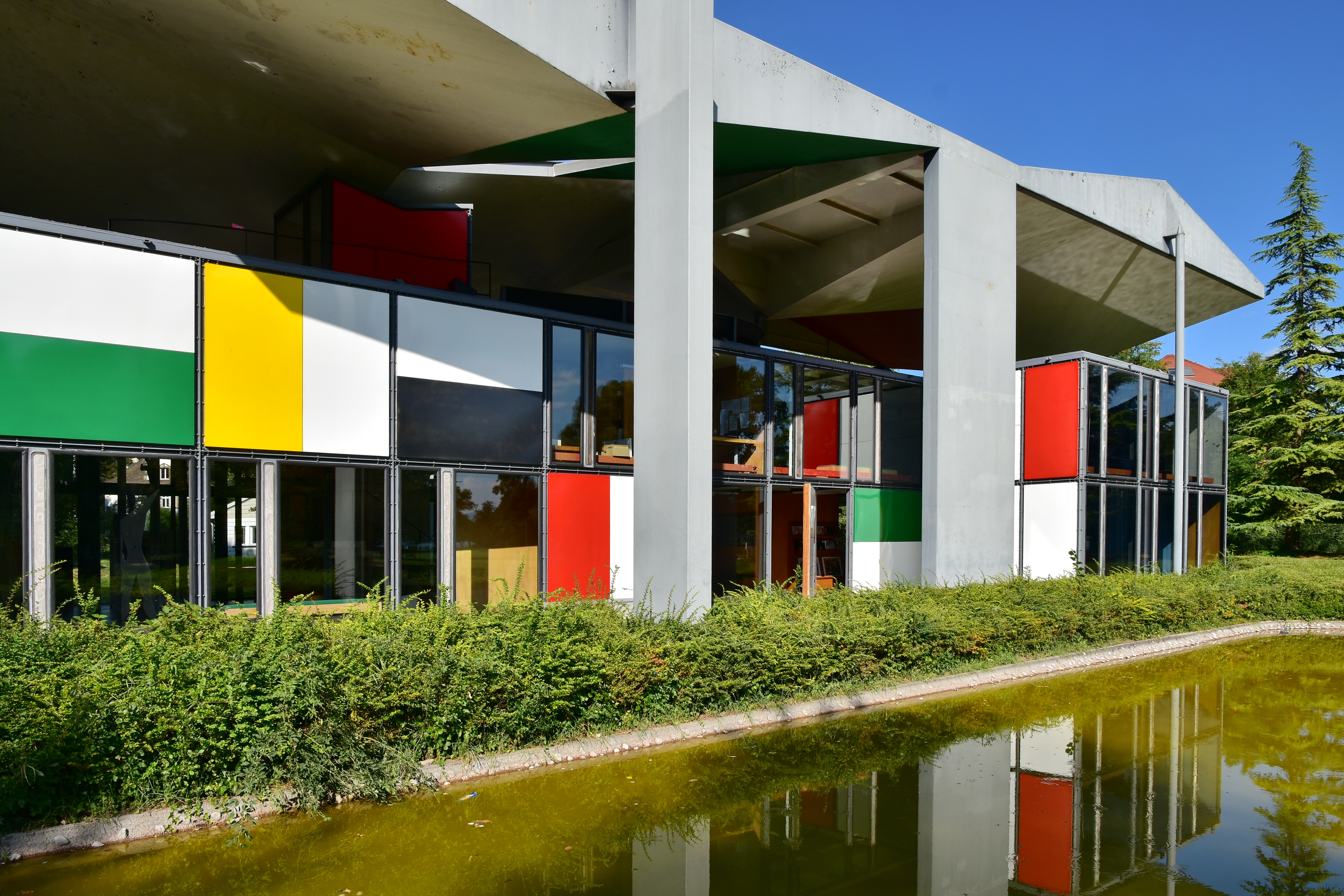

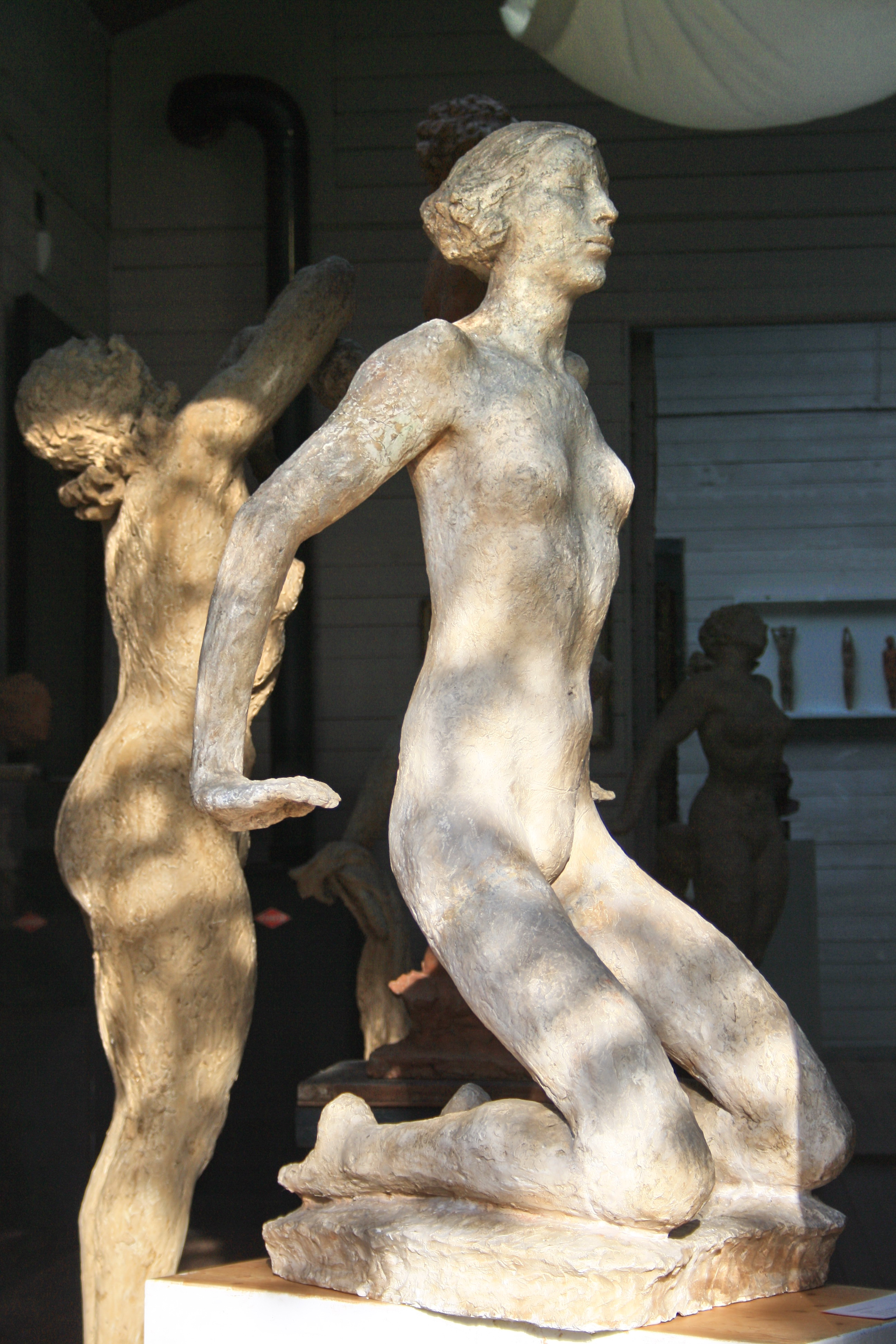

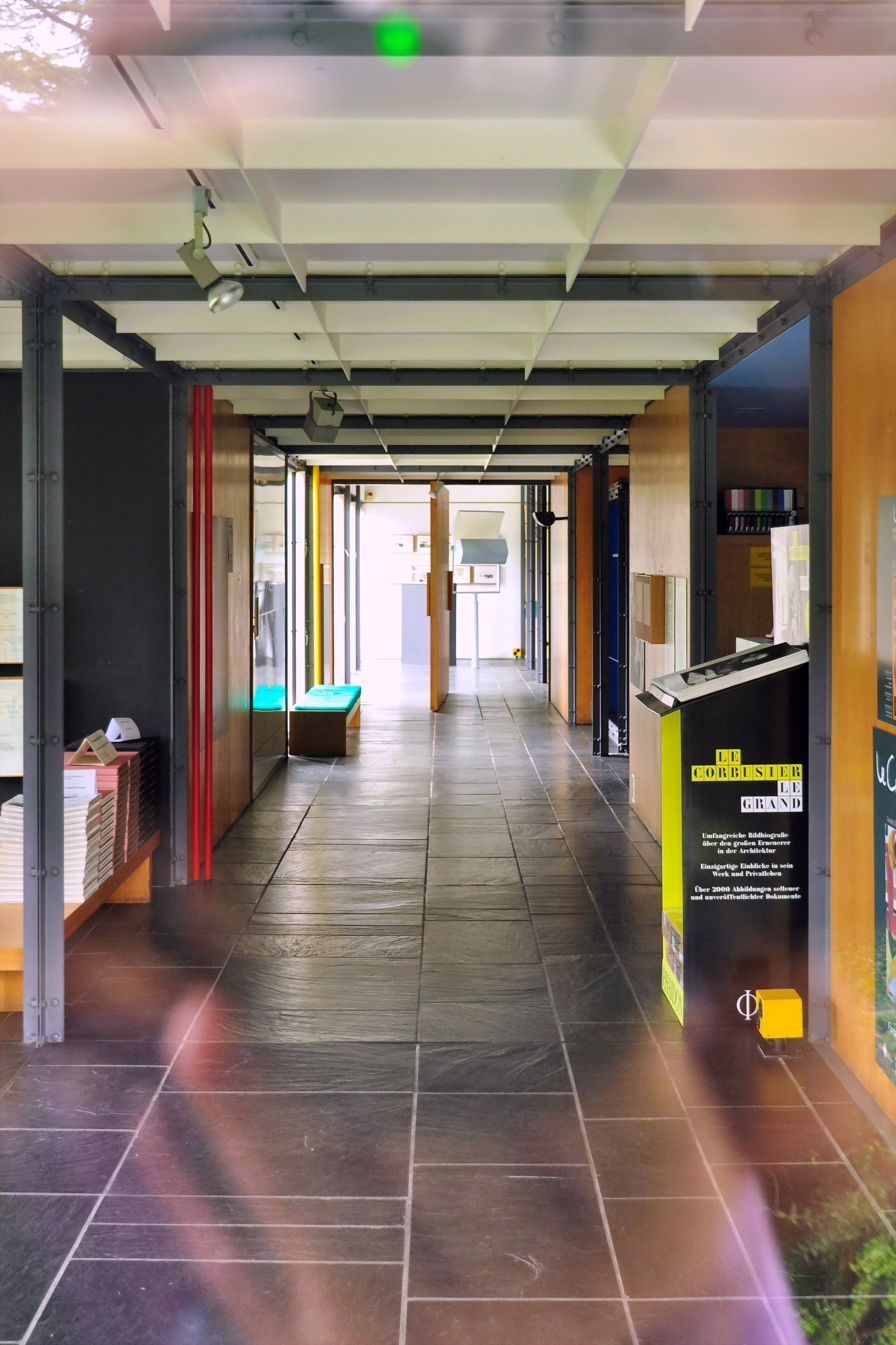

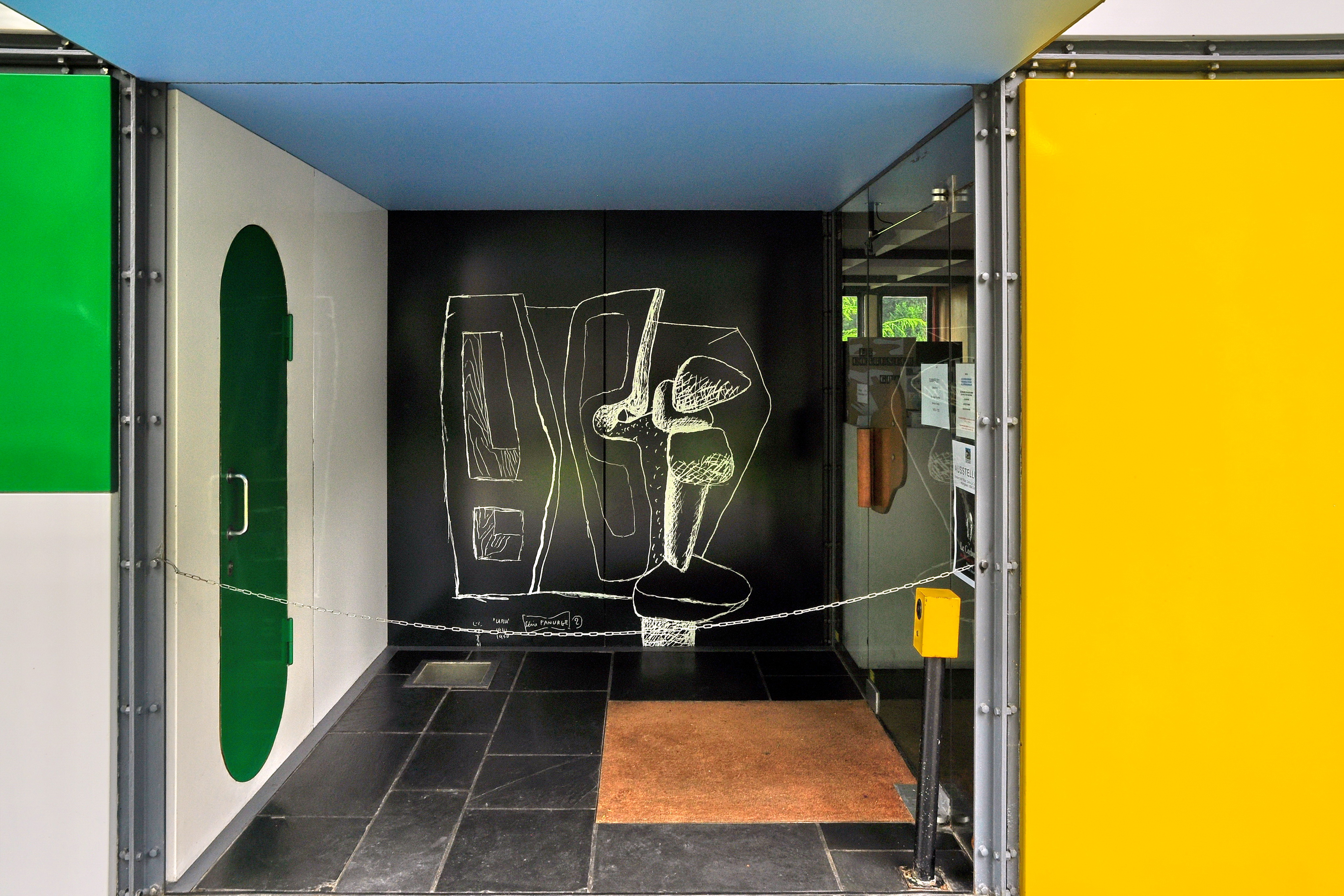

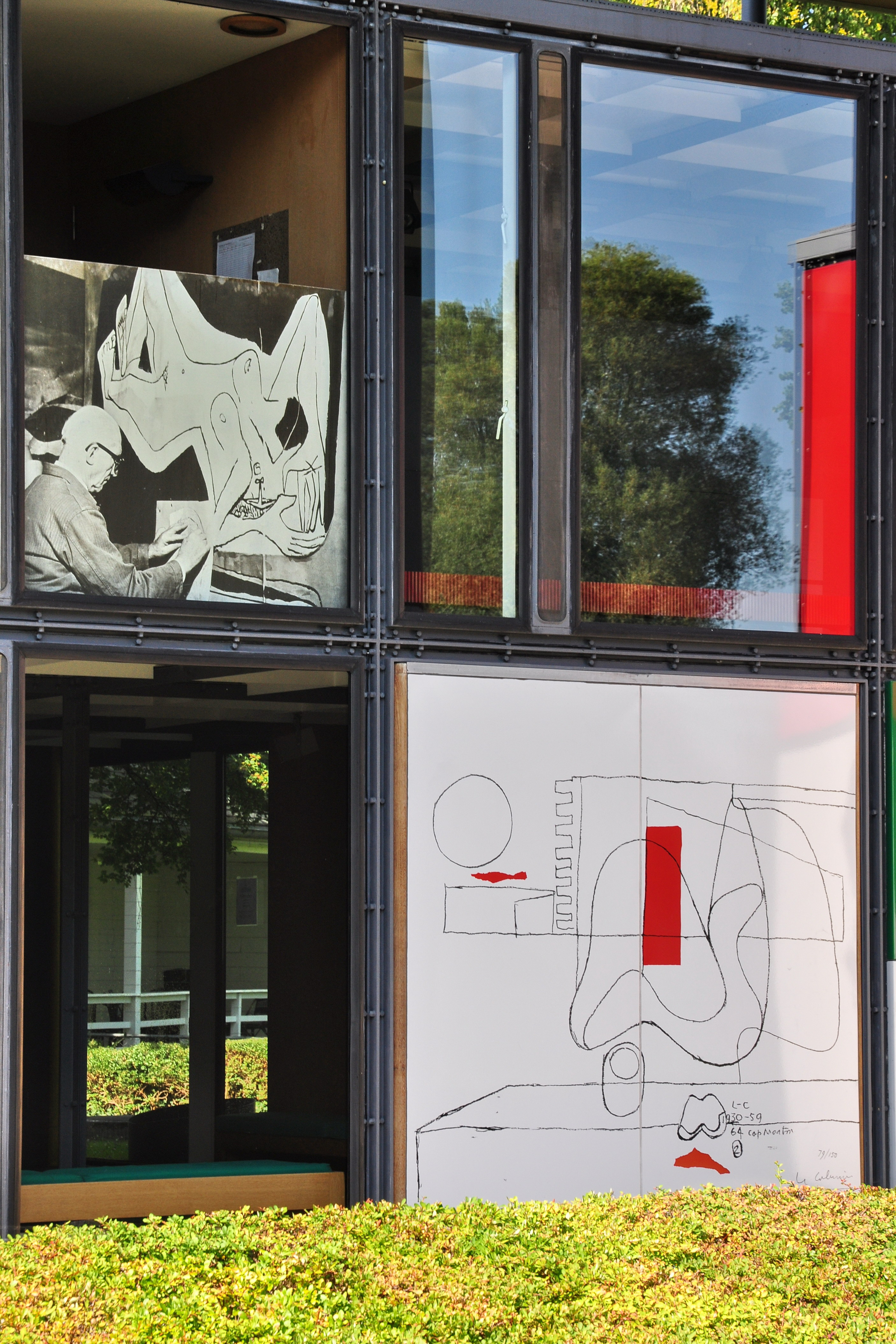

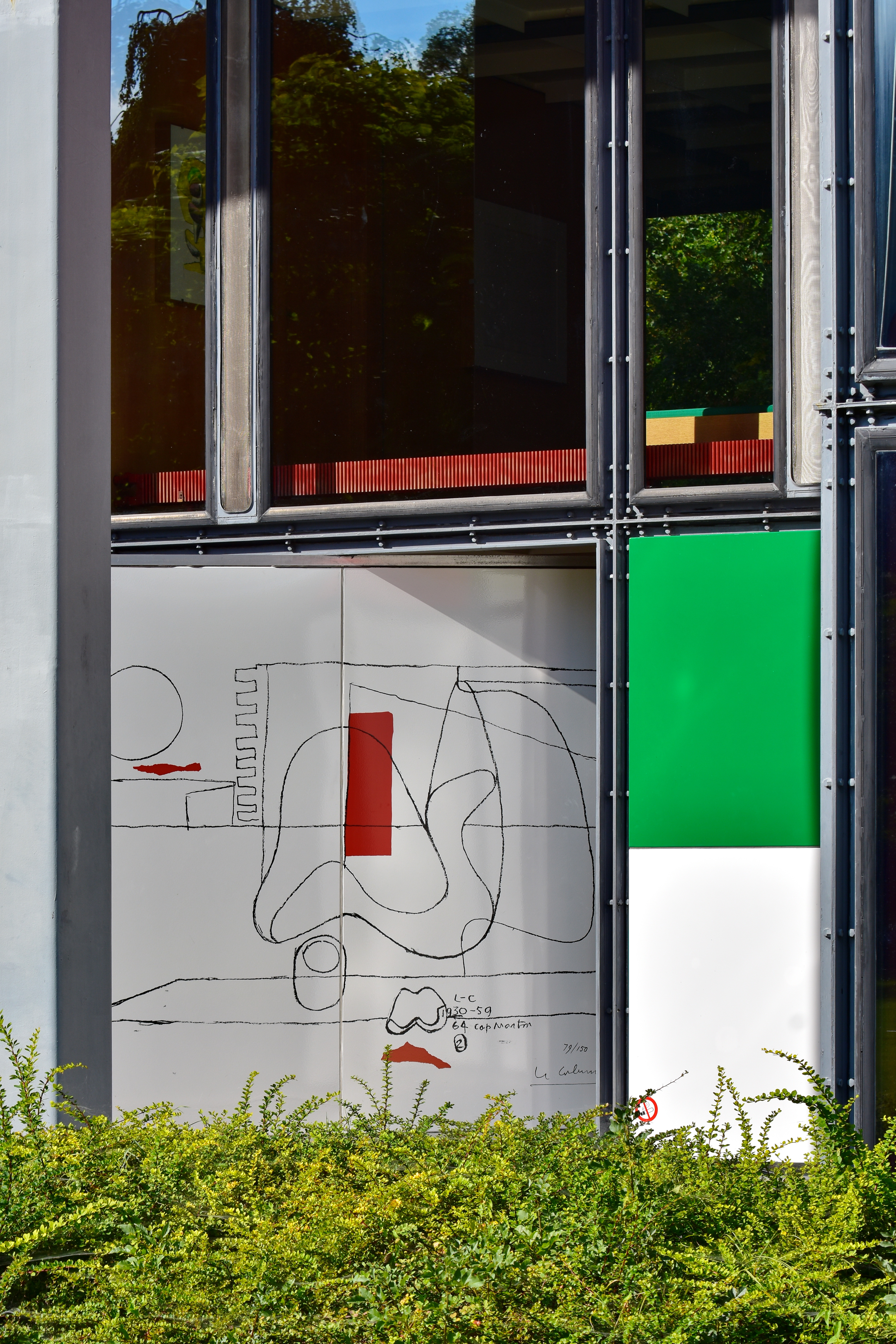

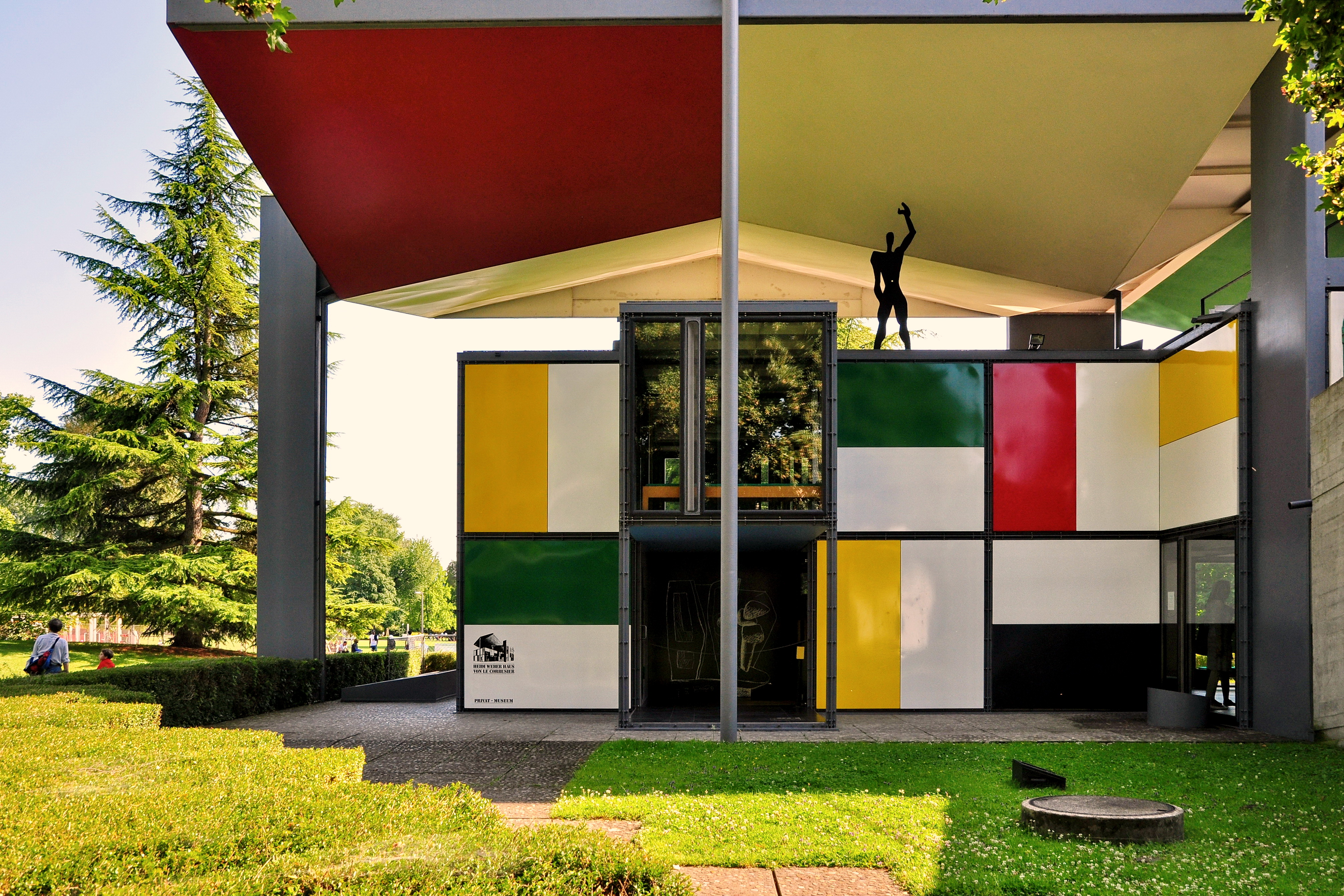

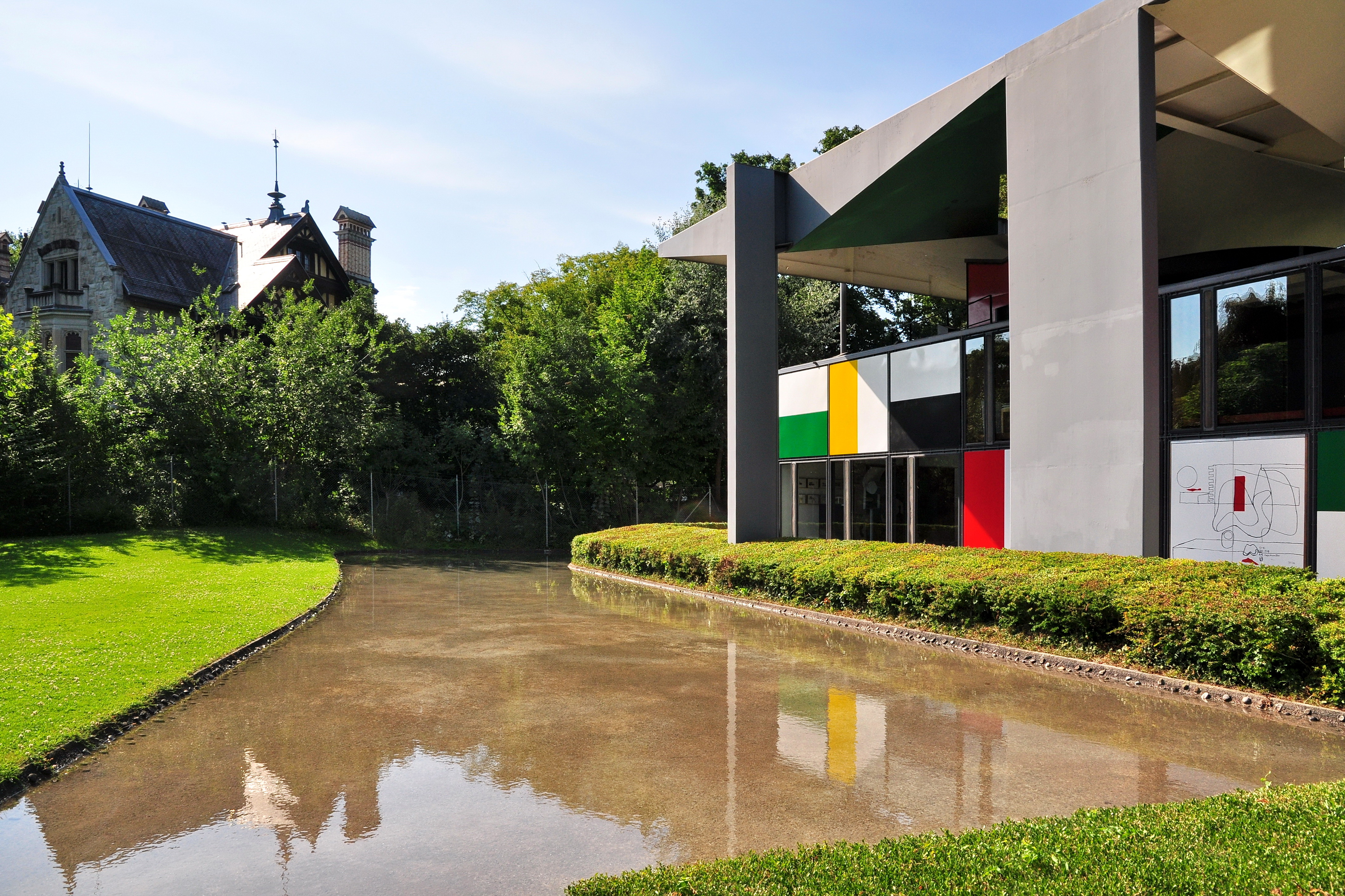

The most prominent architectural element, the roof, consists of two square parts, each side having a surface of 12 x 12 metres (39 ft). The total ground surface measures 12 x 26.3 metres (86 ft), consisting of welded metal sheets and having a weight of 40 tons. The roof was prefabricated and thereafter, in the biggest possible units, transported to the building site, where it was assembled on the ground. The two finally welded parts of the roof were then lifted to their final height (9 metres (30 ft)) by a crane and fixed on the pillars. With the frame thus completed, the construction process benefited from the independent roof protection which was at that time already in its proper place. It consists of cubes 2.26 x 2.26 metres (7.4 ft) which were assembled on the site. Walls, windows, ceilings and floors were then screwed onto the steel frame. The walls consist of enamelled panels measuring 1.13 metres (3.7 ft) x 2.26 metres (7.4 ft). The placing of these enamel panels was planned according to a particular rhythmic system. Finally, the entire building complex was placed on a concrete ground floor. The building has two floors – five single-storied and one double-storied rooms. When constructing the building complex, more than 20,000 bolts were used.

== Museum ==
The Centre Le Corbusier can be considered a Gesamtkunstwerk, i.e. a total work of art, and reflects the harmonic unity of Le Corbusier's architecture, sculptures, paintings, furniture designs and his writings, which is unique and possibly the only one such existing structure in the world. In 1968/69 Jürg Gasser's comprehensive photographic survey related to Chandigarh was exhibited; the Zürich photographer had visited the new capital of India's constituent state of Punjab on behalf of Heidi Weber. While Heidi Weber removed Le Corbusier's sculptures, designs and mementos in mid-May 2016 for personal reasons, the city of Zürich as the new owner replaced these items from others sources respectively collections.

== History ==
In 1960 Le Corbusier was mandated by Heidi Weber, a Swiss art collector and patron, to conceive a public exhibition building. One year later, the first drawings for a building to be constructed in concrete were presented, and in 1962 the concept was changed to a steel building. Construction began two years later. In 1965, Le Corbusier died. On 15 July 1967, the Centre Le Corbusier was officially inaugurated. On 13 May 1964, the city government granted a construction permit free of charge, with the condition that the building revert to municipal ownership after 50 years. Therefore, on 13 May 2014 the building became the property of the city of Zürich represented by the newly created public Heidi Weber Foundation – Centre Le Corbusier. The board of trustees is represented by the city as well as by Heidi Weber: "I welcome this solution. It helps me to be able to enter the house in new hands".

By April 2016 the Heidi Weber Foundation – Centre Le Corbusier preserved the last building designed by Le Corbusier, organized exhibitions, and collected and documents related to the architect's work. In an interview end of May 2016, Heidi Weber stated that she was disappointed that the city of Zürich renamed the museum and building to "Pavillon Le Corbusier", ignoring the well-established "Heidi Weber Museum" name. Municipal officials stated that the museum's name of Centre Le Corbusier – Heidi Weber Museum was damned by Weber. In mid-May 2016, Heidi Weber vacated the museum and removed images, sketches, sculptures, tapestry, furniture, the original models of the building, and an archive of Corbusier's letters and notes, after negotiations with the city of Zürich failed, from her perspective. Weber has pursued legal action to have her name restored to the museum.

By Mid-2016 the museum was administered by the cultural department of the city of Zürich, after the establishment of a foundation could no longer take place, according to city officials, due to changes in the law. A plaque at the museum's entrance praises Weber's merits and records the gratitude of the city of Zürich. In an interview end of May 2016, Weber was negotiating with the cities of Shanghai and Santiago on the opening of a Corbusier house, her son added. The museum was run by Eva Wagner from 2014 to 2017. During this period, there were four temporary exhibitions on the work and personality of Le Corbusier, as well as works by the Swiss architect. Since then, the pavilion has attracted a total of around 35,000 visitors in the summer months. On 1 October 2017, the museum closed and the interim operation ended.

== Reorganisation and renovation ==
The listed pavilion will be renovated until spring 2019. From then on, the Museum für Gestaltung will operate the pavilion. A jury of experts unanimously chose the concept of the museum in September 2017 because it convinced with an "attractive, tailor-made programme for exhibitions and accompanying events". In December 2016, the city parliament had approved operating subsidies of CHF 500,000 per annum for the new sponsorship for the years 2019 to 2022. In addition, the city will be exempted from rent of CHF 220,000 per annum.

== Cultural heritage of national importance ==
The museum is listed in the Swiss inventory of cultural property of national and regional significance as a Class A object of national importance.

== Legacy ==
The Pavillon Le Corbusier in Zürich built in 1967 was copied in Chandigarh in India in 1967 as exactly the same building but in different material. Concrete was used in Chandigarh instead of steel and glass. The building was called the Government Museum and Art Gallery, designed by Le Corbusier & Pierre Jeanneret along with the associated architects Manmohan Nath Sharma and Shi Dutt Sharma, 1960–1962.

== Literature ==
- Heidi Weber – 50 Years Ambassador for Le Corbusier 1958–2008. Birckhäuser Publisher, 2009, ISBN 978-3-7643-8963-5.

== See also ==
- List of art museums
- List of museums in Switzerland
