= Quaibrücke, Zurich =

Quaibrücke1
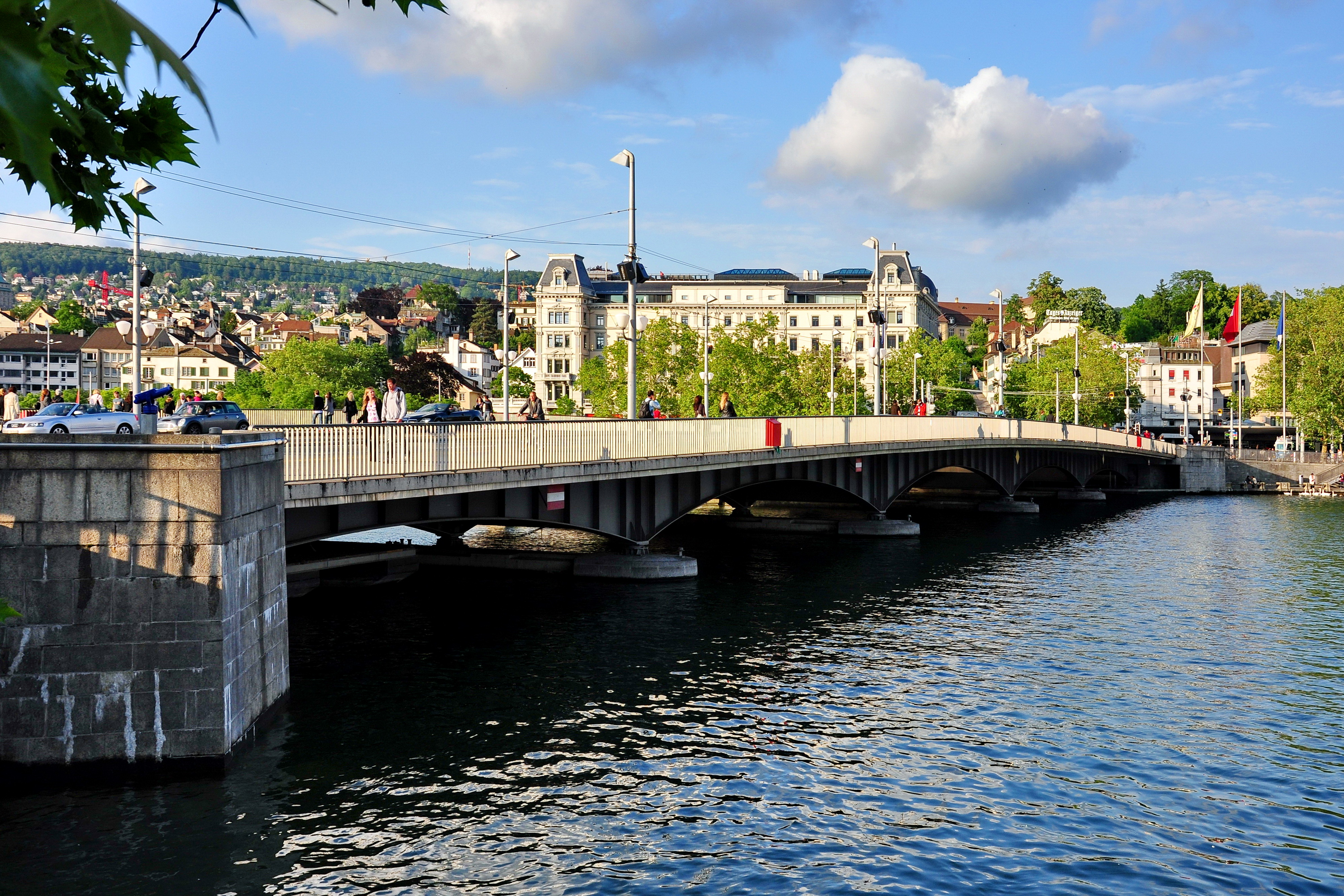
- Quaibrücke
- Coordinates: 47°22′01″N 8°32′35″E
- Carries: Two tram tracks, and on each side two lanes for road traffic, bicycles, and pedestrian sidewalks
- Crosses: Limmat, the outflow of Lake Zurich
- Locale: Zurich, Switzerland
- Official name: Quaibrücke
- ID number: 1560
- Followed by: Münsterbrücke

Characteristics
- Material: Steel
- Width: 30.5 m (100 ft)
- Longest span: 121.9 m (400 ft)
- No. of spans: 4

History
- Architect: Emil Schmid-Kerez, Zurich; Holzmann & Cie., Frankfurt; Gebrüder Benckiser, Pforzheim
- Engineering design by: Arnold Bürkli
- Construction start: 1880
- Construction end: 1884
- Opened: 1 January 1885, 18 March 1984
- Rebuilt: 1932, 1939 (widening to 28.5m), 1983-1984 (total rebuild and widening to 30.5m), 2015 (refurbishment)

Location
- Interactive map of Quaibrücke1

Quaibrücke (lit. 'Quay Bridge') is a road, tramway, pedestrian and bicycle bridge over the river Limmat, at the outflow of Lake Zurich in the city of Zurich, Switzerland. It was built simultaneously with the construction of Zurich's new quays between 1881 and 1887.

== Geography ==
The Quaibrücke is situated at the outflow of Lake Zurich and connects Bürkliplatz with Bellevueplatz, and thus the lake's left (or western) shore with the right (or eastern) shore. It is a nodal point of tram lines 2, 5, 8, 9 and 11, as well of the road traffic between General-Guisan-Quai and Utoquai.

== History ==
=== 1880–1884 ===
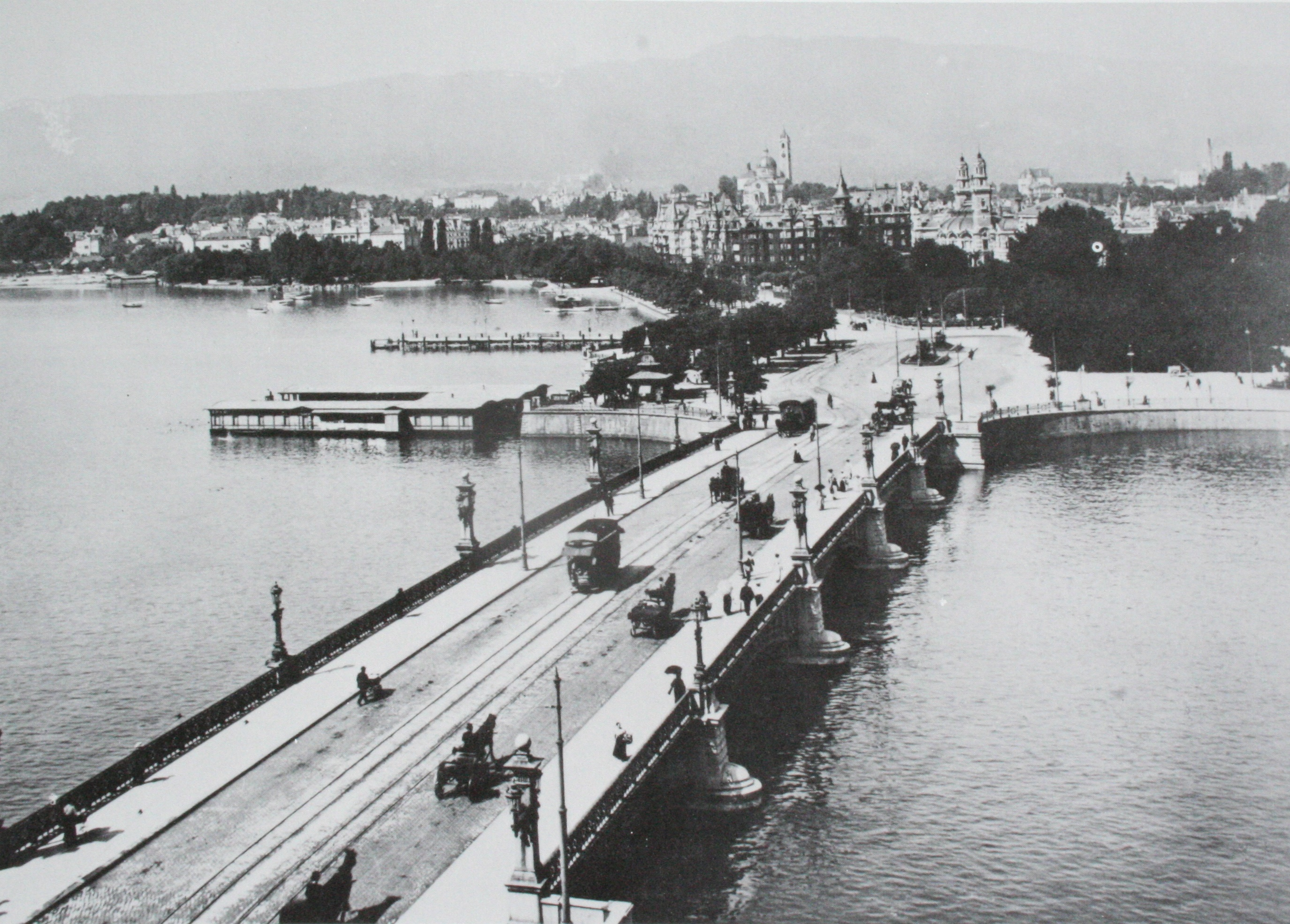
Quaibrücke around 1890

The Quaibrücke was erected between 1880 and 1884 under the management of Arnold Bürkli (1833–1894), the city engineer appointed in 1860. A modern land connection was urgently needed after an intense political campaign, as in 1893 Zurich was to be expanded by incorporating 11 neighboring municipalities.

On May 18, 1873, the municipal legislature approved the construction of the Quaibrücke with a strong majority vote. In a vote on September 4, 1881, the municipalities of Enge (left shore), Riesbach (right shore), and Zurich approved the financing loan. In the outcome of the conducted tender procedure for project planning works, four submitted offers were opened on September 5, 1881. As samples of the Zurich lake bed on the designated area revealed that it was covered by layers of mud above sandy clay loam deposits, the proposed pile foundation of the bridge was the decisive factor. Arnold Bürkli's proposal was inspired by solution implemented for the building of "Neue Börse" in Basel (later known as Basler Handelsbank and ultimately the predecessor of UBS AG). On March 18, 1882, the contract was awarded to Zurich architect Emil Schmid-Kerez, in collaboration with Philipp Holzmann & Cie. from Frankfurt and Gebrüder Benckiser from Pforzheim. The project group undertook to complete the construction of a 20 meter wide bridge (12 meters of lanes and 4 meters of sidewalk on each side) on or before July 15, 1883, for a payment of CHF 860'000.

The Quaibrücke was built simultaneously with the Utoquai and General-Guisan-Quai on the two shores of Lake Zurich, but the bridge was finished half a year earlier. Since the bridge blocked traffic onto the Limmat, the berth of the ZSG Zürichsee-Schifffahrtsgesellschaft had to be moved from the Bauschänzli island to the present Bürkliterrasse.

=== 1930s–1940s ===
In 1932, the road surface was renewed. In view of the Swiss National Exhibition 1939 and expected increase in traffic, the city council envisaged to further develop Bellevueplatz and the Quaibrücke, and the width of the bridge was increased to 28.5 meters in 1939.

Upon the German invasion of Poland in WWII and as part of the Zurich lakefront, two machine gun bunkers were built in the 1940s, which are still preserved at their original sites at Limmatquai and Bürkliterrasse. The bunker at Bürkliplatz was designed by the Stadtkommando Zürich (Zurich City Commando) as a concrete machine gun stand in the wall of Quaybrücke and was erected during May and June 1940 in the form of a gallery with a sequence of five battle rooms ("Kampfräume") lined up next to each other. Due to its layout of five Kampfräume and the central location in the very heart of Zurich, the bunker was nicknamed the "5-Zimmer-Villa" ("five-bedroom villa"). The site was declassified in March, 2004.

=== 1983–1984 ===
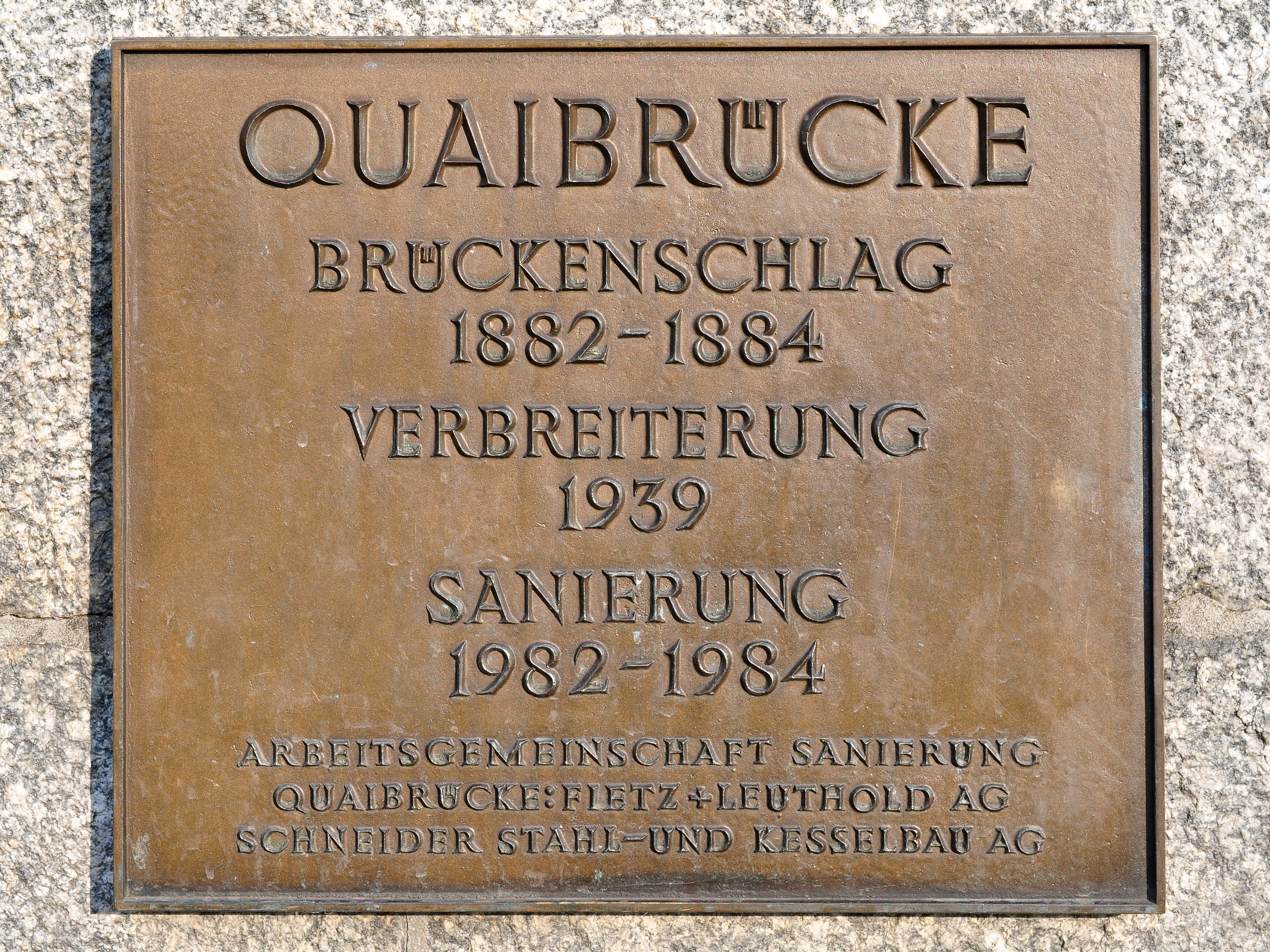
Commemorative panel at the Quaibrücke

Due to increasing maintenance costs, the original bridge had to be replaced in 1984. A new bridge was built parallel to the old bridge between 1983 and 1984 on steel girders. The weekend of March 16-17, 1984 traffic was stopped and the old bridge was moved onto steel beams atop piles driven into the lake. It took 15 hours in total to move the old bridge and replace it with a concrete slab. Construction costs totaled 18 million CHF, and the replacement increased the width of the bridge to 30.5 meters. Initiatives to redesign the old bridge as a pedestrian zone were rejected.

=== 2015 ===
Between April and November 2015 further refurbishment works were completed, with 50 cm wide steel structures added to both sides of the bridge, allowing the existing combination masts (lighting poles and guy masts) to be relocated and to free up space for pedestrian and bicycle paths.

== See also ==
- List of bridges in Switzerland
