= Chinese Garden, Zurich =

Park in Switzerland

Coordinates: 47°21′18″N 8°33′07″E

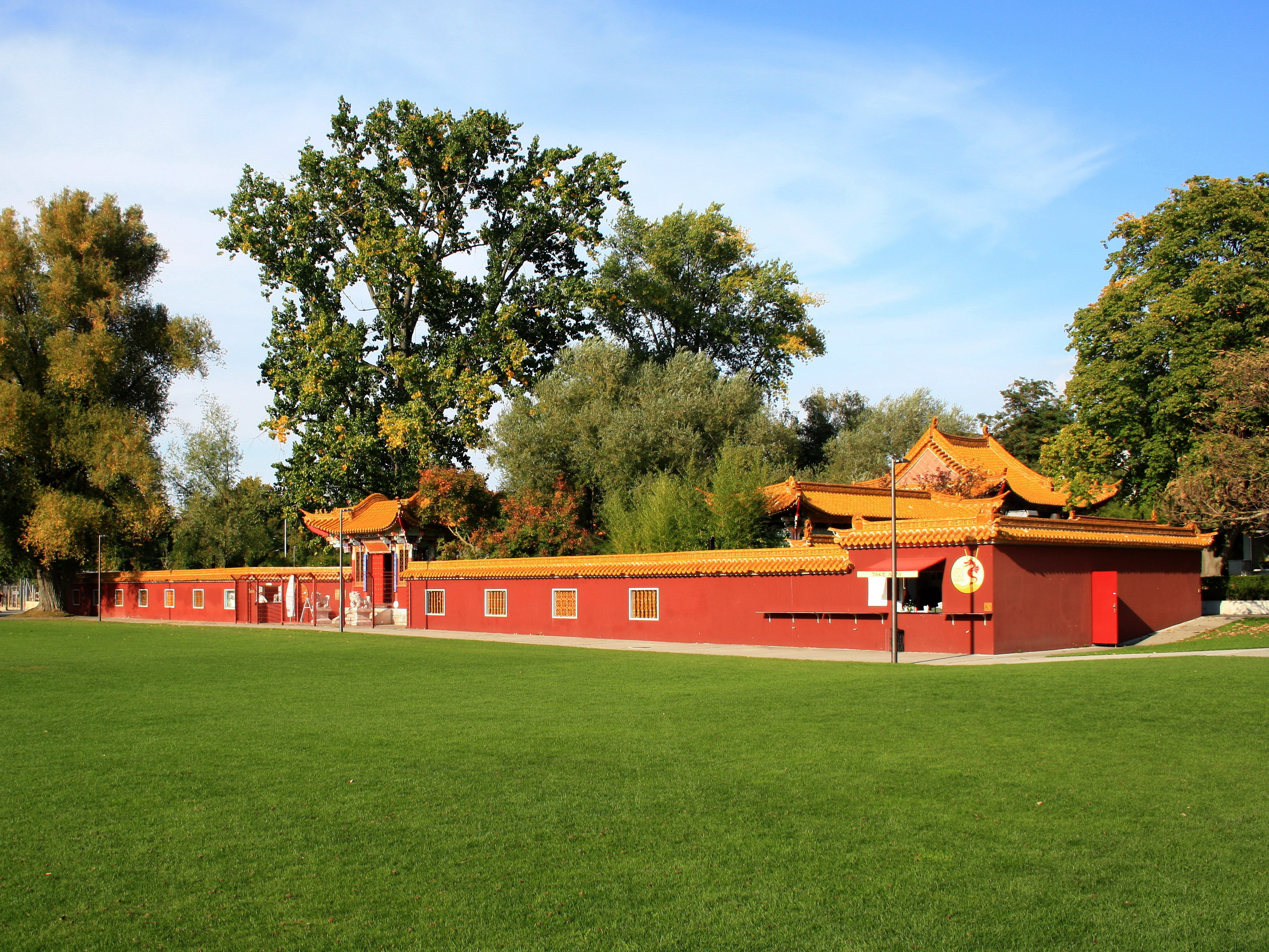
Chinese Garden, Zurich

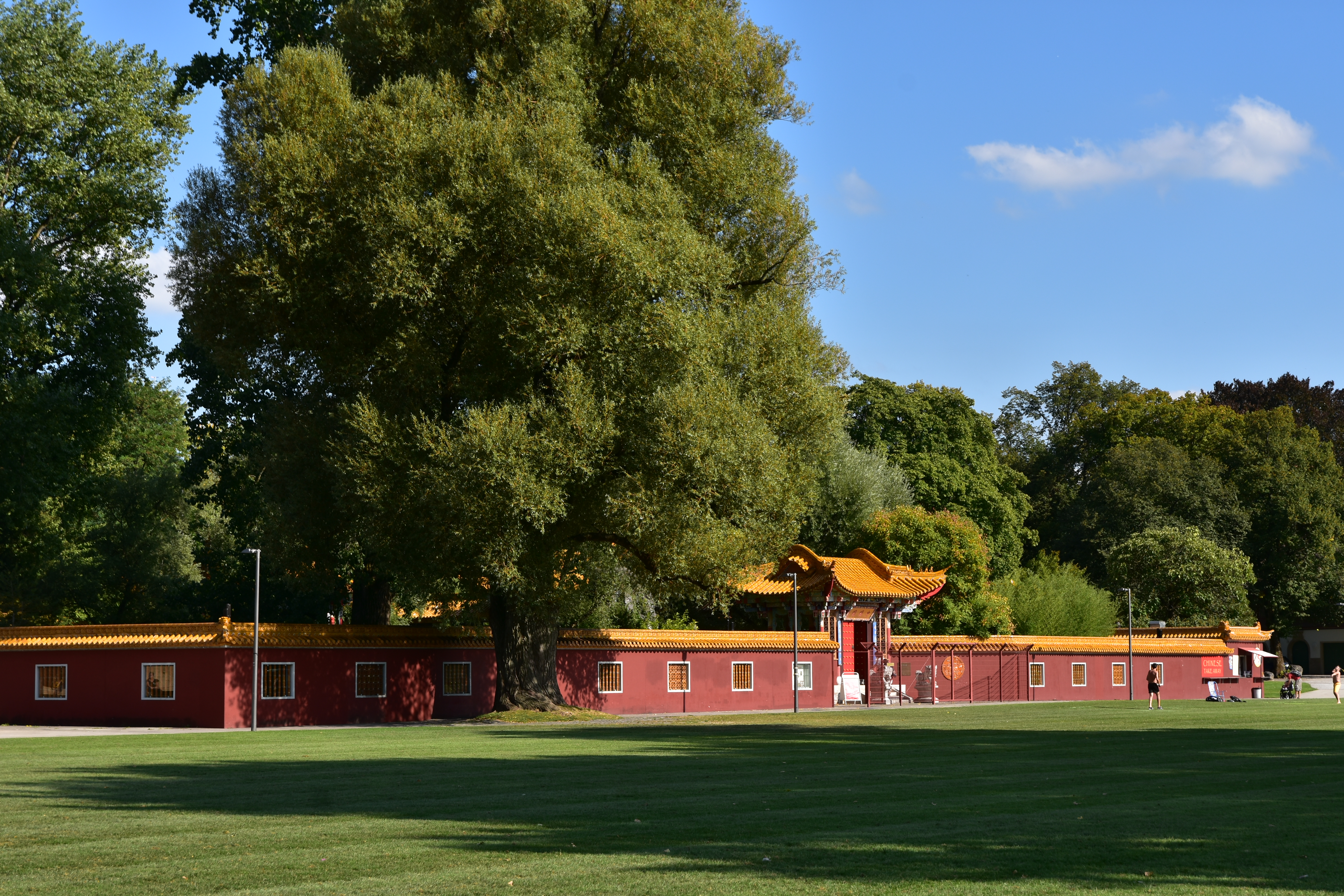

The Chinese Garden (German: Chinagarten Zürich) is a Chinese garden in the Swiss city of Zurich. It is a gift from Zurich's Chinese partner town, Kunming, dedicated to the Three Friends of Winter.

== Location and history ==
Zurich's Chinese garden is located in the city's Seefeld quarter, next to the Pavillon Le Corbusier between Blatterwiese and Bellerivestrasse and near to the Zürichhorn peninsula on the right shore of Lake Zurich. Ending winter season, the garden will be opened on March 18 to October 18, daily from 11:00 (am) to 19:00 (7 pm), even on Sundays and public holidays. Tram lines 2 and 4, together with bus line 33, serve nearby stops at Höschgasse or Fröhlichstrasse, whilst bus lines 912 and 916 run from Bellevue to Chinagarten.

The garden is a gift by Zurich's Chinese partner town, Kunming, as thanks for Zurich's technical and scientific assistance in the development of the Kunming city drinking water supply and drainage. From May to October 1993, it was built under the direction of the Zurich garden department, in cooperation by garden experts and craftsmen from Kunming and Zurich, paid by Zurich city administration. Its official inauguration was in spring 1994, under participation of the mayor of Kunming and Zurich mayor Josef Estermann. From 2010 on, maintenance and operation are provided by Grün Stadt Zürich, the City of Zurich's Office of Parks and Open Spaces, a service of the Civil Engineering and Waste Management Department.

== Landscaping and buildings ==
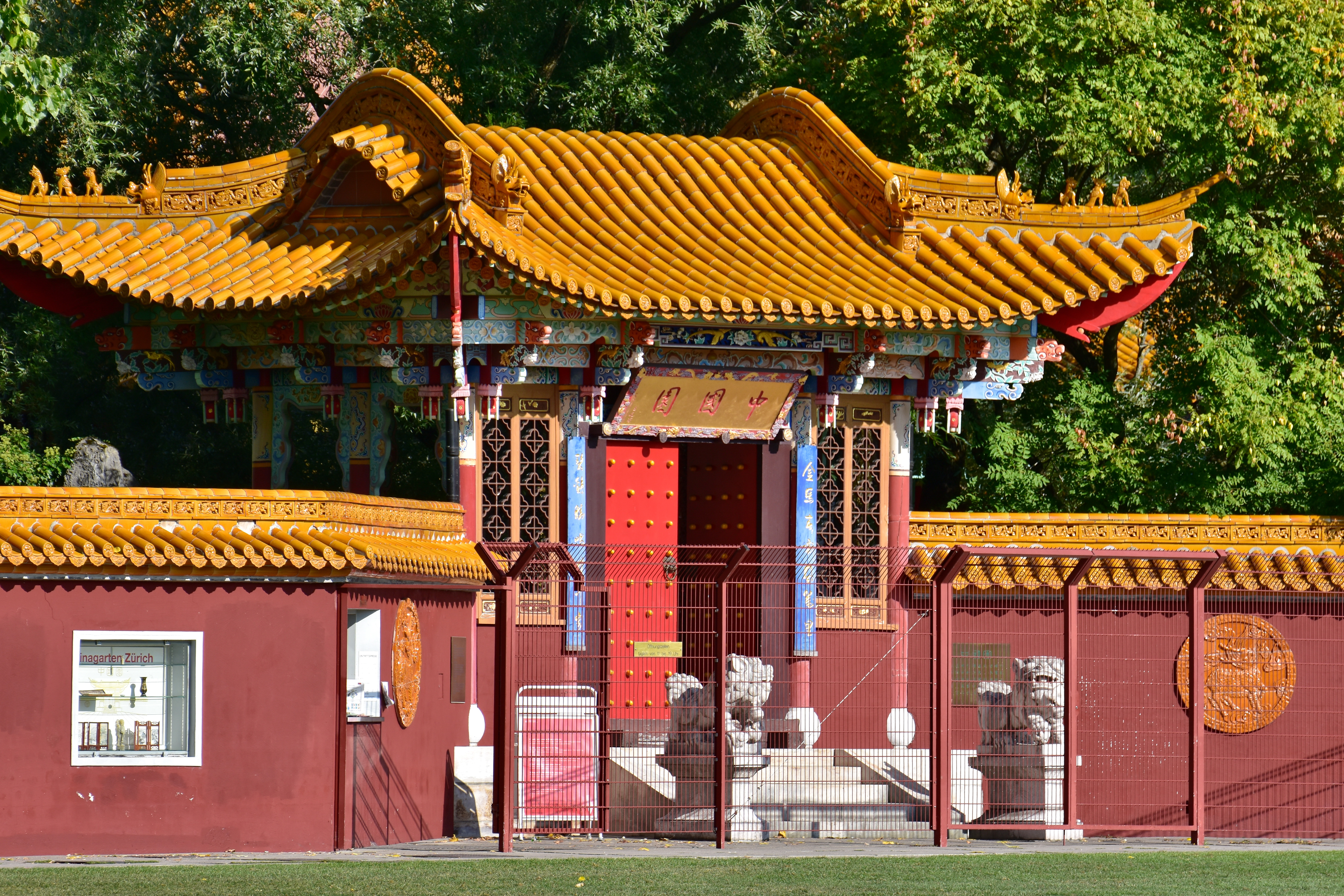
Main entrance

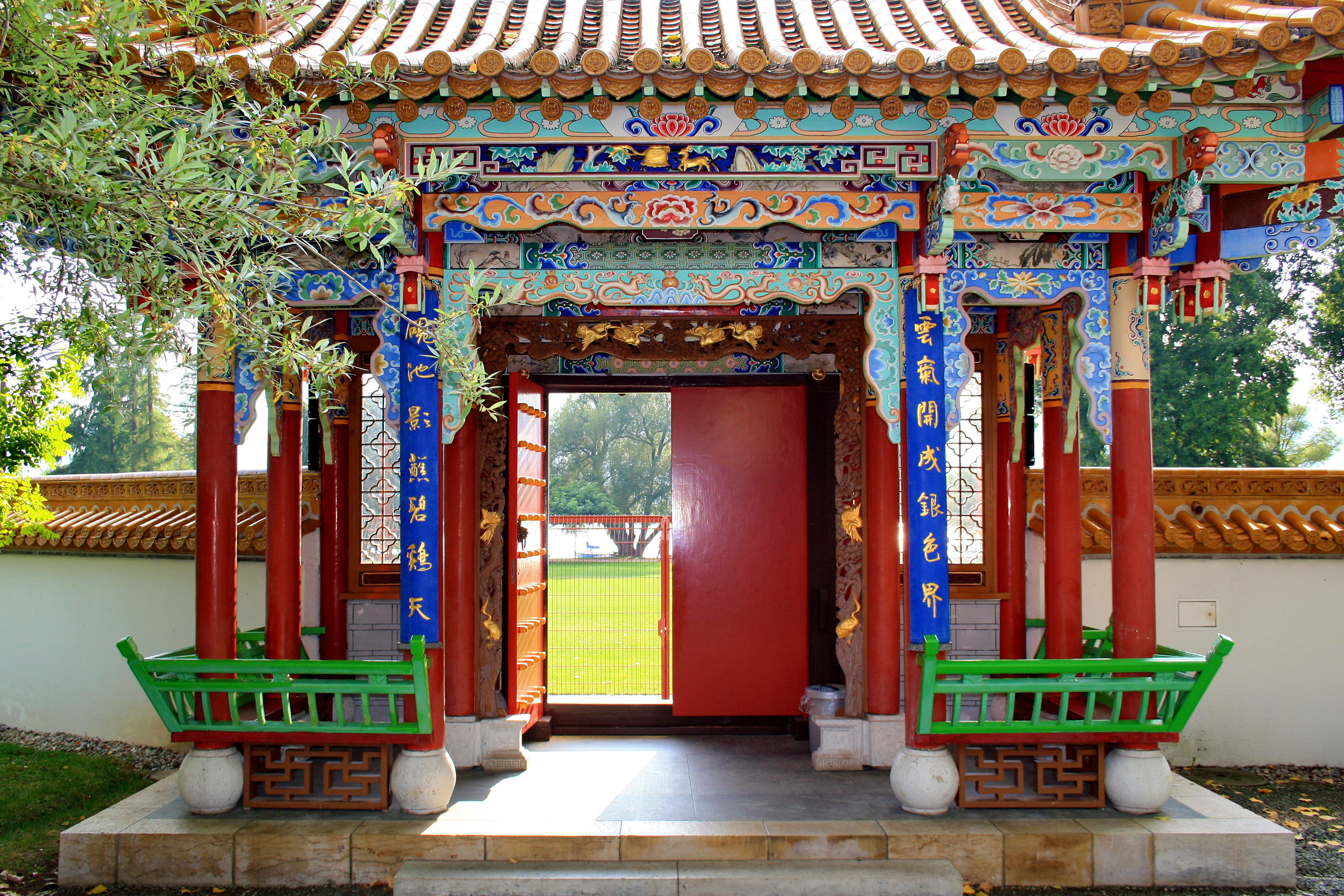
Main entrance, inside view

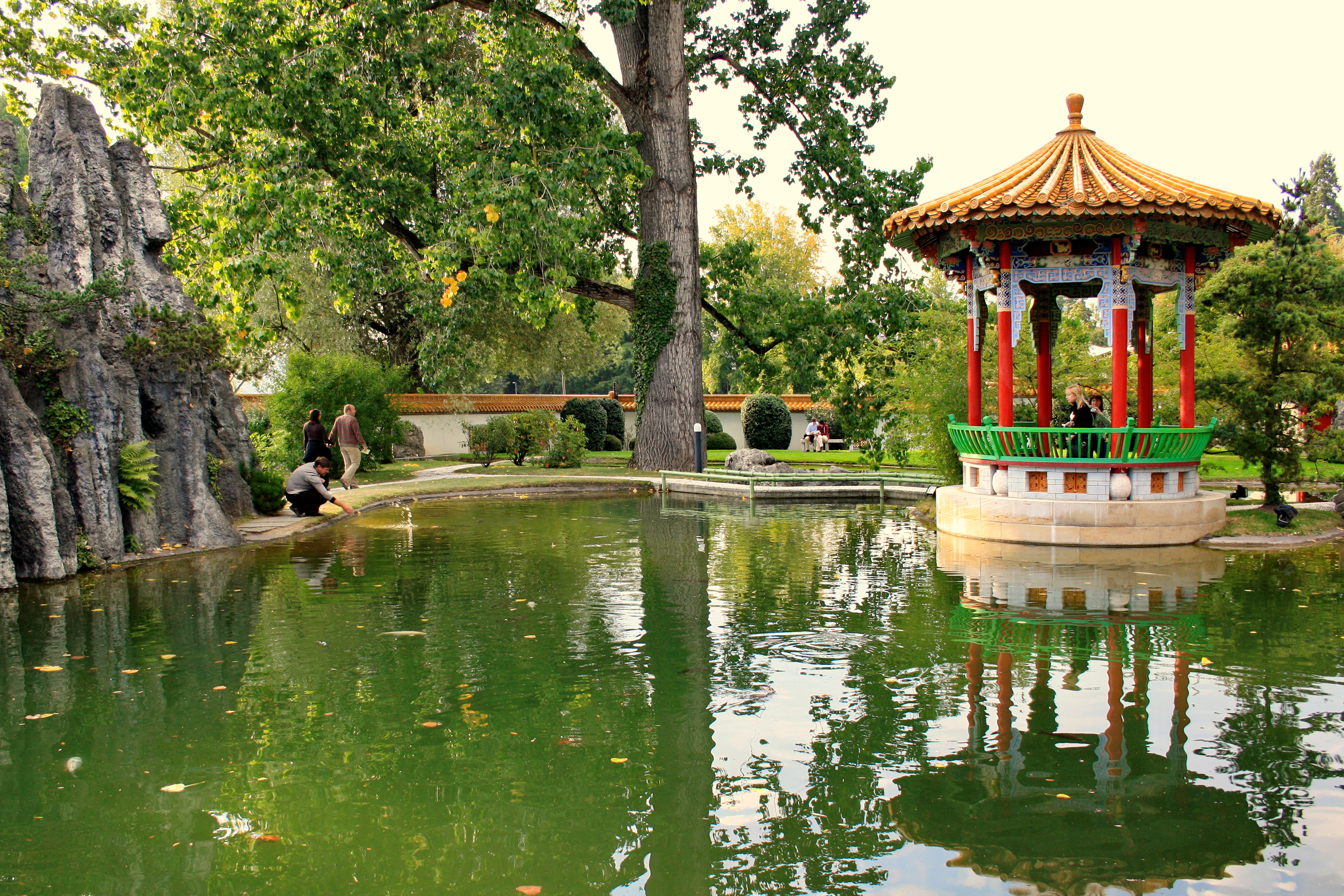
The pond and island pavilion

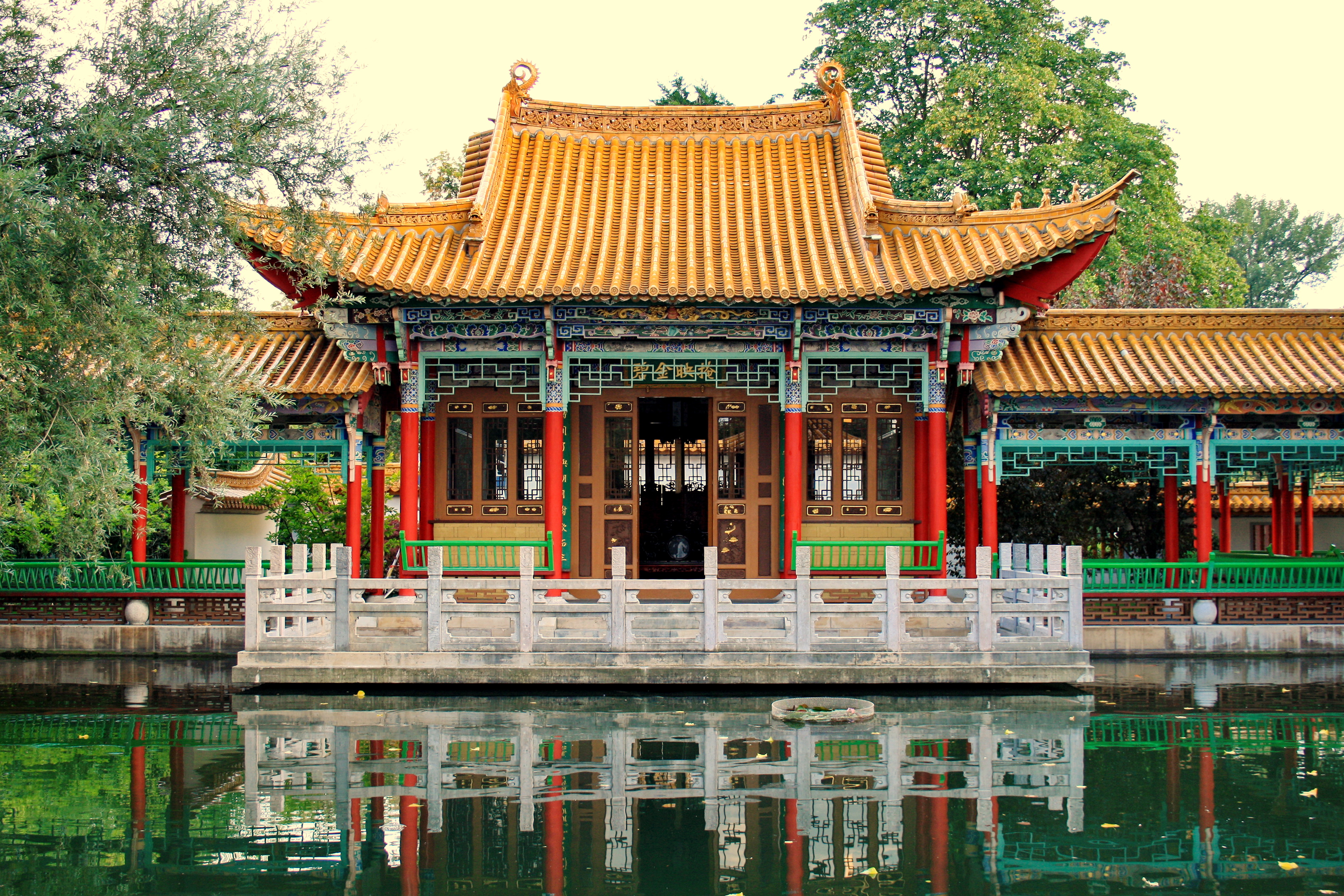
Water palace

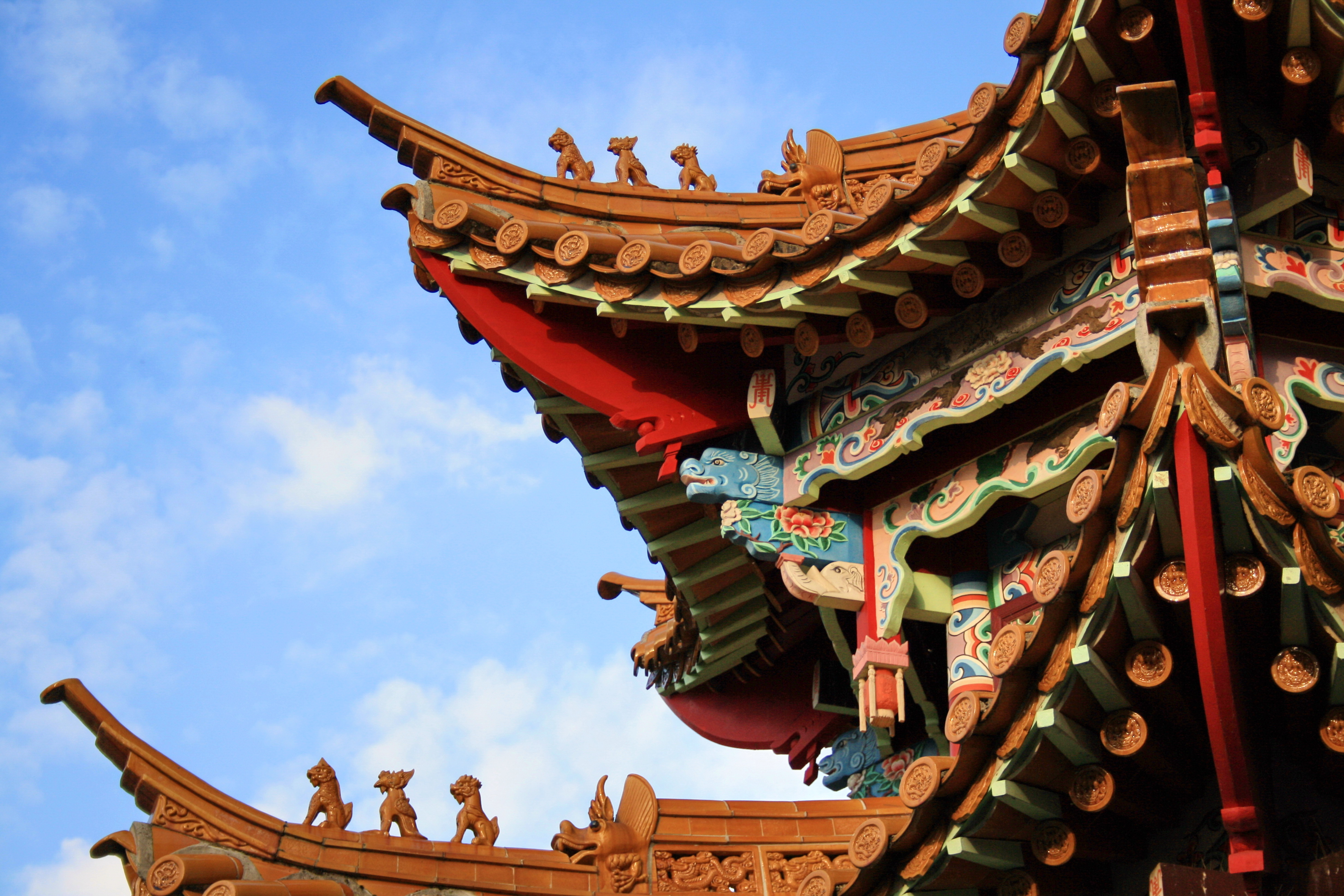
Detail view of the hexagonal pavilion

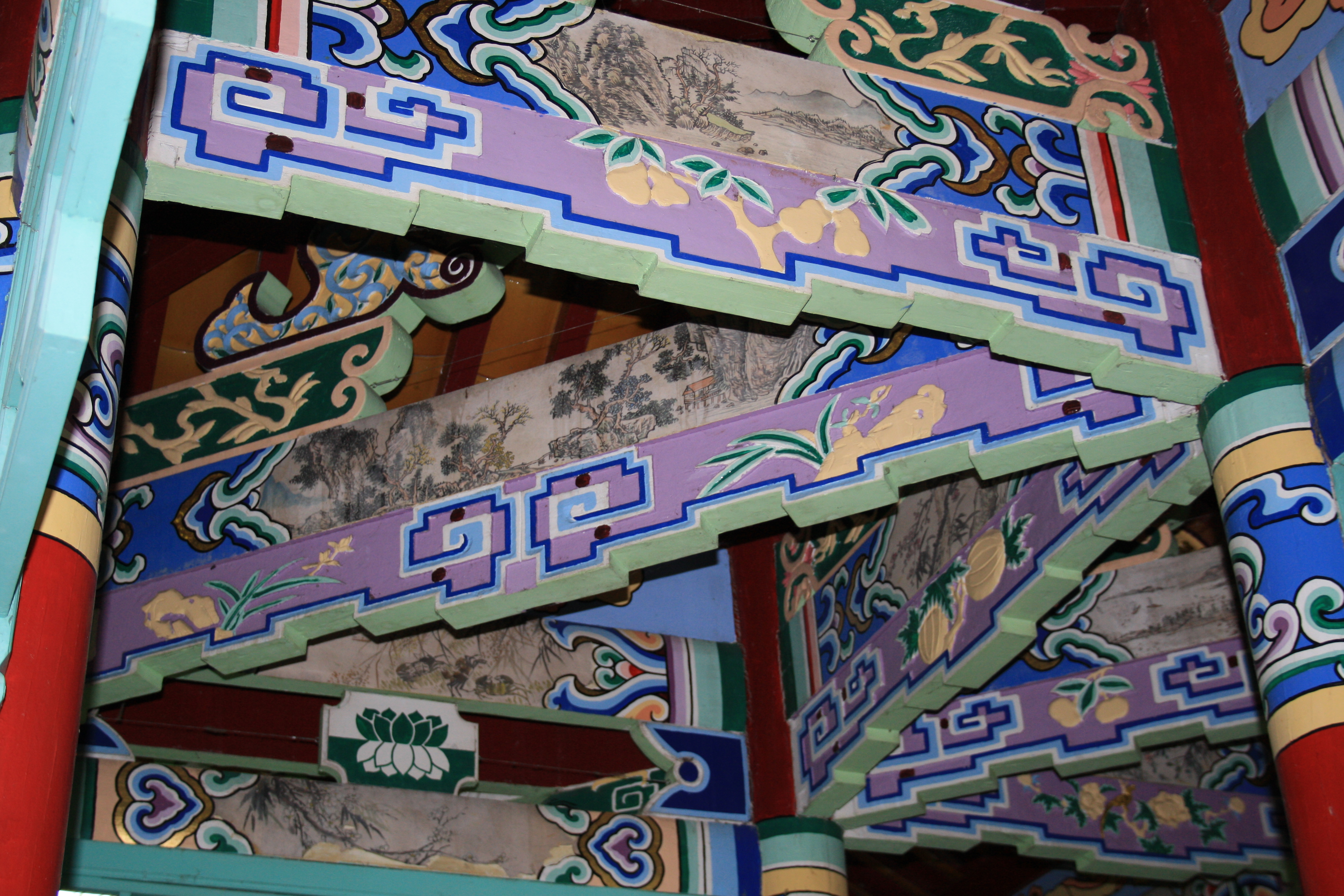
The gallery and some of the ceiling paintings

The garden covers an exactly rectangular terrain, surrounded by a low wall. Its central element is a pond with a small island.

The surrounding wall separates the outer mundane world from art, an ideal microcosm in the garden inside – offers protection against unwanted visitors, too. The wall has on three sides windows, with barred bamboo and lotus flower tiles. Eaves and final bricks as well as the frieze bear small sculptural figures, representing the Chinese dragon of clouds. The second of the nine dragon sons, the Chiwen dragon, adorns the corners and tops of the walls.

The main portal (entrance) is emblazoned with a calligraphy on a golden plate, meaning China Garden. Nine nail rows and the red color of the gate originally were reserved for the emperor. In China's Yunnan province, for 300 years they have been an essential architectural element of garden plants. The second door was originally named the second-last gate of the Imperial Court's inner rooms. The carved panels on both sides, are excerpts from Chinese tales. The artificial mountain represents the meaning of landscape – "mountain und water" – and contrast yin and yang.

A bridge connects the pavilion island and the inner garden, alluding to the island of immortals. The circular pavilion embodies the middle, and so the fifth cardinal direction in the culture of China. Its inscriptions refer to water as a symbol of friendship between the cities of Kunming and Zurich. The hexagonal pavilion suggests lofty heights and snow drift in winter. The carvings are full of allegories: the fenghuang (Chinese phoenix) as a symbol of the empress, and flowers as another symbol of female beauty. The inside of the pavilion displays symbols of good luck and landscapes. A square pavilion forms the entrance to the galleries and to the water palace. Its entrance shows two golden phoenixes. A carved archway is devoted to the spring, a magpie and plum blossoms announce the newly waked life. Open galleries are adorned by more than 500 still lifes and landscapes. Its carved archmbeams are a particular feature of the gardens of Yunnan. A short winding path symbolizes abundance and harmony.

The water palace is the heart of the Chinese garden. The painting of its exterior walls, doors and windows is deliberately kept simple, so that visitors are able to concentrate to the inner qualities of the building. Its terrace opens to the water surface, showing all important elements of the garden, its rear garden is called the garden of shadows.

== Symbolism ==
The garden is an expression of one of the main themes of Chinese culture, the "Three Friends of Winter", three plants that together brave the cold season: pine, bamboo and plum blossom. The inscriptions and paintings point to the uniqueness of the culture of Yunnan and its influences from various ethnic groups. Trees and flowers represent the source of feelings and aspirations. In Zurich's Chinese garden, the local poplars are integrated in the overall design. The pond is lined with willows, as symbol of pure water and holiness. Also important are four ginkgos between the open gallery and the northern wall. Bamboo represents a forest, with its deep unique sound when wind is blowing. Pine symbolizes the male principle among the trees and a long life. The last of the "Three Friends of Winter" is the plum blossom, beginning to bloom in late winter, and therefore a joyful symbol of spring.

Water is the central element, as a symbol of friendship between Kunming and Zurich. Entering the garden, the pond opens our view to all important elements of the garden.
