= AC8 =

AC8 or AC-8 may refer to:

- USS Neptune (AC-8), a US Navy collier ship active during World War I
- Comte AC-8, a 1930s Swiss six-seat light transport aircraft
- Southern Pacific class AC-8, a model of steam locomotive
- AC-8, an IEC Utilization Category
- Ace Combat 8: Wings of Theve, a combat flight action video game
