= Ad Astra Aero =

Swiss airline

- Founded: 1919
- Ceased operations: 1930
- Headquarters: Zürichhorn, Switzerland
- Key people: Alfred Comte, Walter Mittelholzer, Émile Taddéoli

Ad Astra Aero (Latin for "to the stars air") was a Swiss airline based at Zürichhorn in Zürich.

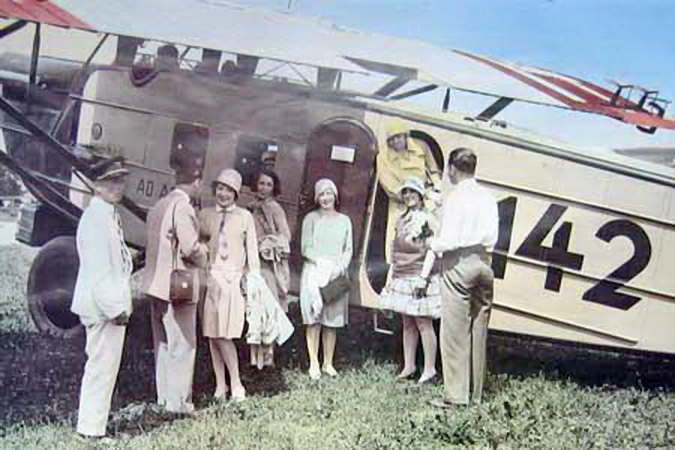
Dornier Merkur (CH 142) operated by Ad Astra Aero (1927)

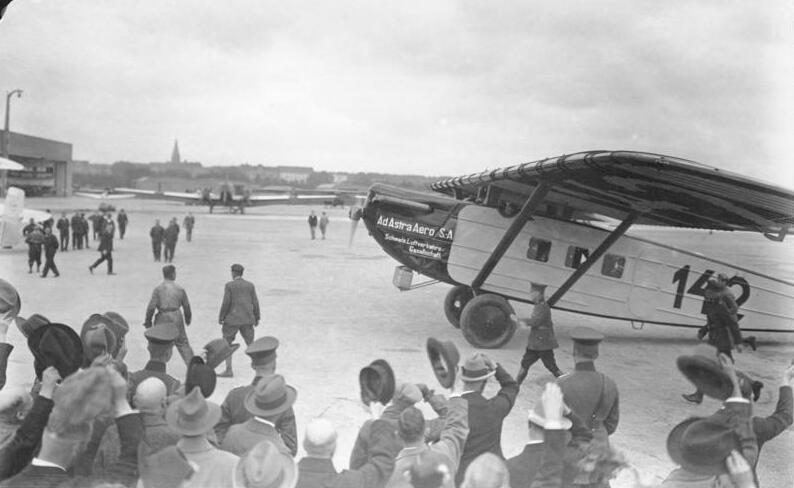
Walter Mittelholzer using Dornier B-Bal Merkur (CH-142) at Berlin Tempelhof Airport

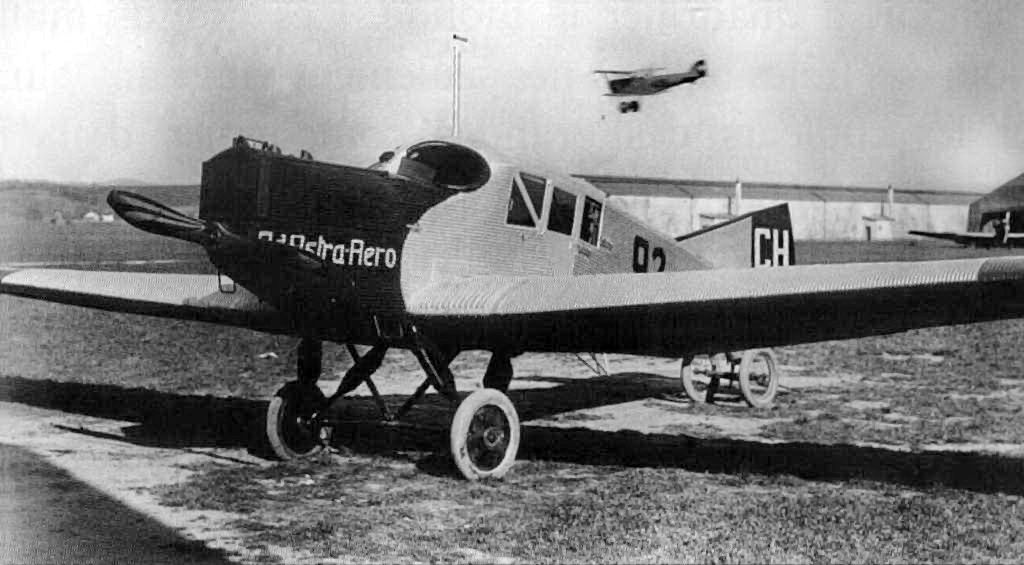
Junkers F.13 (CH-92) operated by Ad Astra Aero

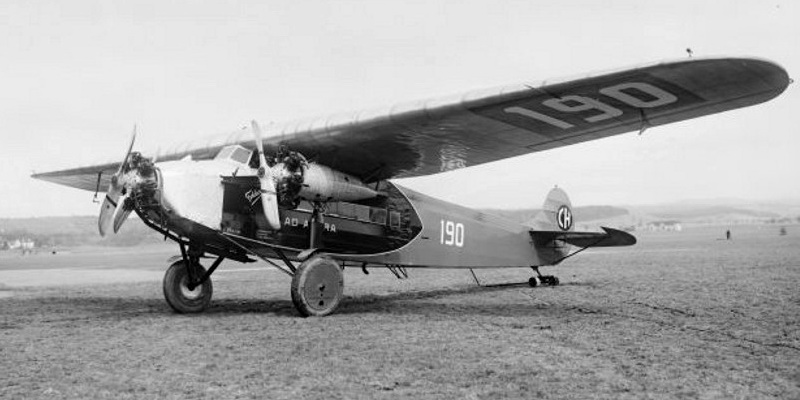
Fokker F.VIIb 3-m (CH-190) operated by Ad Astra Aero

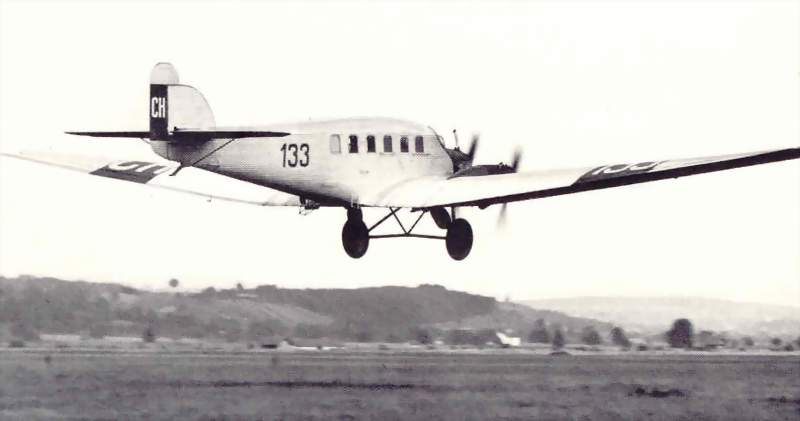
Junkers G.23 (CH-133)

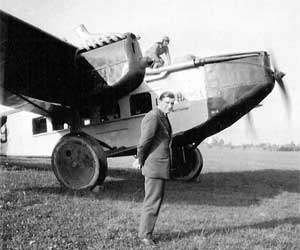
Rohrbach Ro-VIIIa Roland and its pilot Charpentier at Geneva-Cointrin airport (1929)

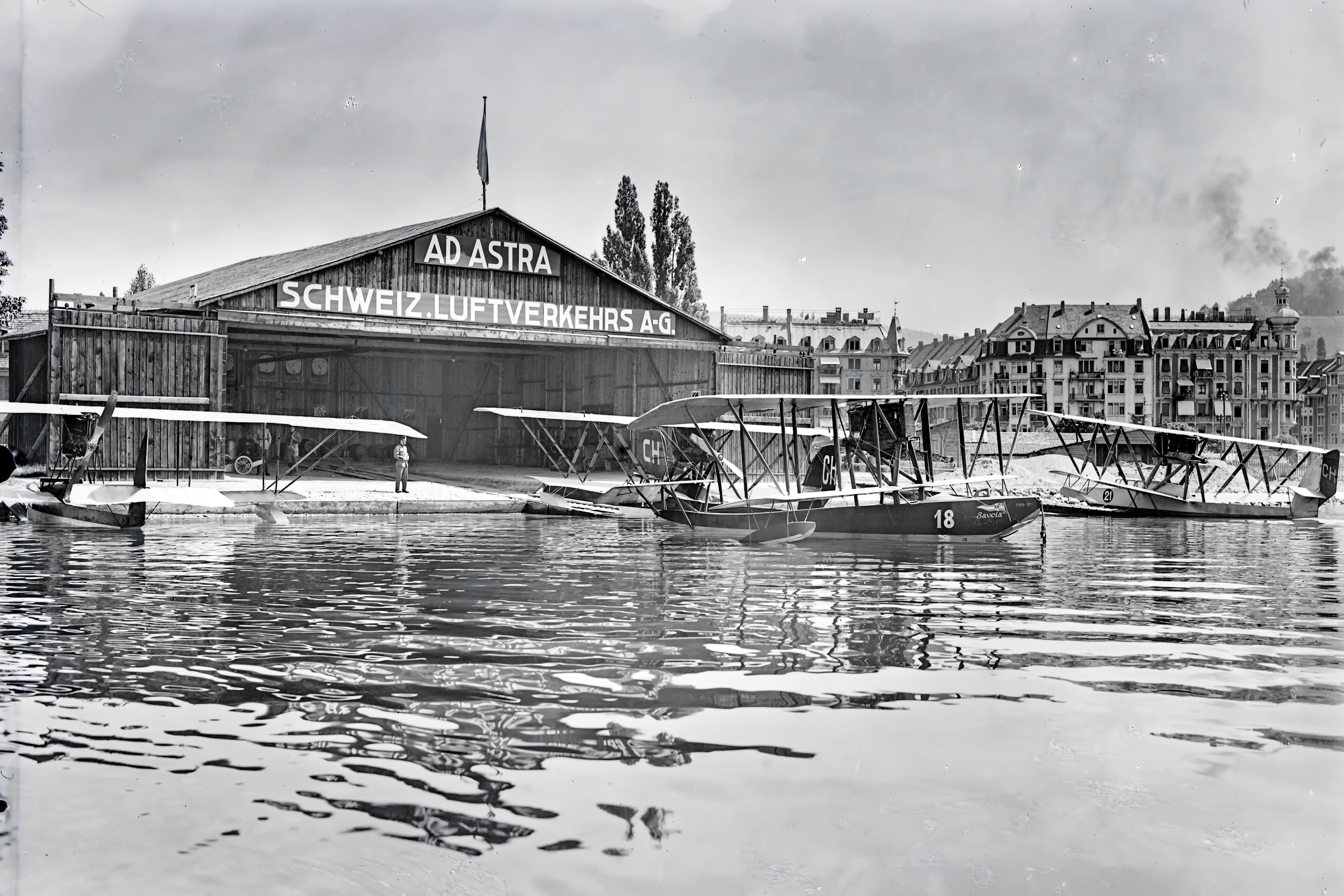
Flying boats of Ad Astra Aero S.A. at Zürichhorn, as of today Strandbad Tiefenbrunnen lido, Bellerivestrasse nearby Zürich Tiefenbrunnen train station in the background (~1920)

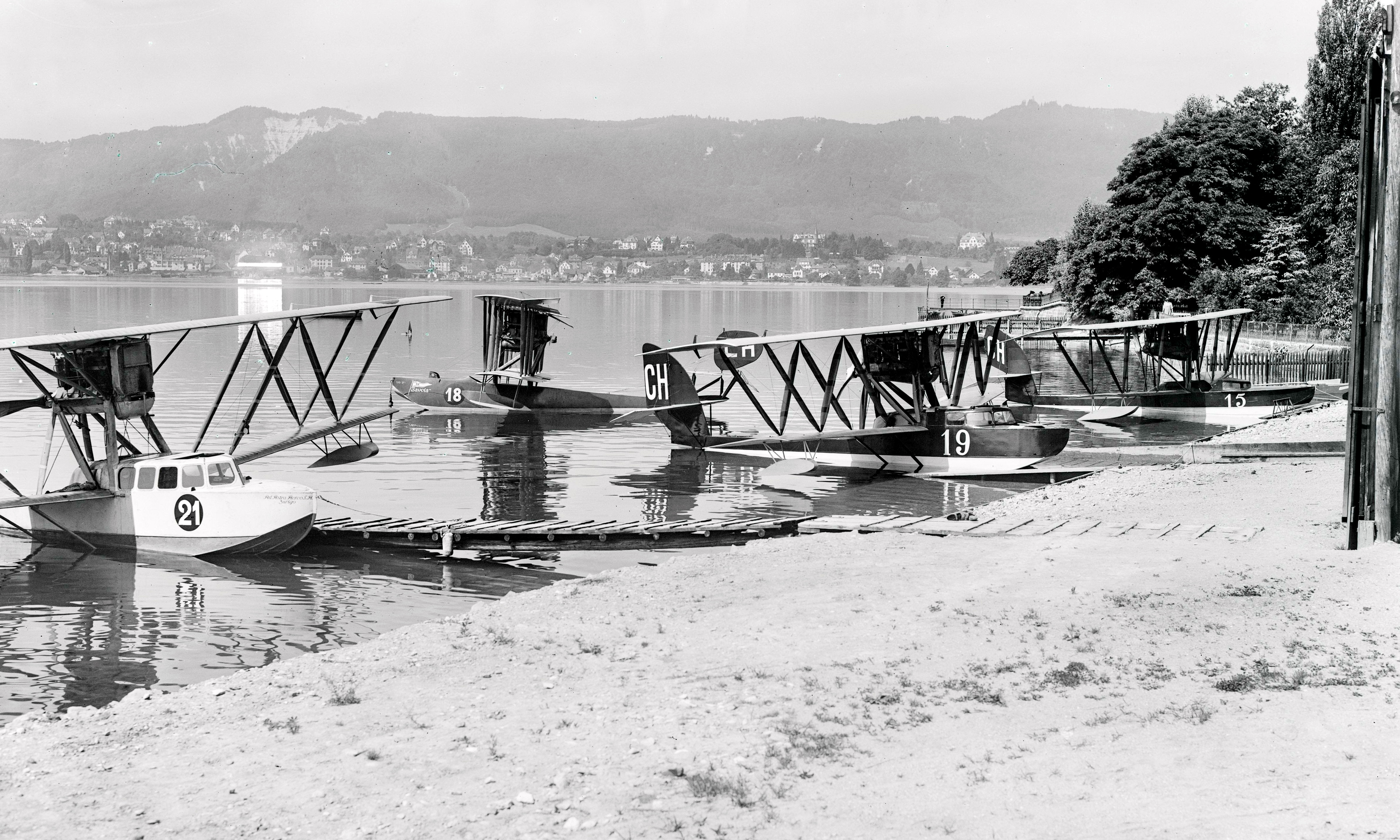
Seaplanes of Ad Astra Aero at Zürichhorn, Albis chain and Fallätsche (to the left), and Uetliberg (to the right) in the background.

== Early years ==
Initiated by Oskar Bider and Fritz Rihner in July 1919, the "Schweizerische Gesellschaft für Lufttourismus" (literally: Swiss corporation for air tourism) was established in Zürich. Tourist flights with flying boats were planned from sites at Zürichhorn in Zürich-Riesbach, and in Genève, Interlaken/Thun, Locarno, Lugano, Luzern, Lausanne-Ouchy, Romanshorn and St. Moritz. Switzerland, with its numerous lakes, appeared predestined for the use of seaplanes, so that no expensive airports would have to be built. Oskar Bider was killed in an accident before the ambitious project was realized. The driving forces of the latter Ad Astra Aero company were the Swiss aviation pioneers Walter Mittelholzer and Alfred Comte. Using Junkers F.13, Comte and Mittelholzer undertook flights over the Alps, Ticino, Matterhorn, the Bernese Alps in late summer 1919, and on 11 September 1919 they succeeded in the crossing of the Mont Blanc (el. 4,807 metres (15,771 ft)).

On December 15, 1919, Ad Astra Aero S.A. was registered as an Aktiengesellschaft, and on 24 February 1920, Ad Astra Aero merged with the airlines Frick & Co and Aero-Gesellschaft Comte Mittelholzer & Co to form Ad Astra Aero AG in Zürich. Alfred Comte was appointed by the board as chief pilot for land planes and Walter Mittelholzer as head of the aerial photography department. On 21 April 1920, Avion Tourisme SA in Geneva was bought and the share capital was doubled to 600,000 Swiss francs. Following the recent merger, the company was renamed in Ad Astra Aero, Avion Tourisme S. A. (Schweiz. Luftverkehrs A.-G.). Flight stations were created in Bern, Geneva, Lugano, Romanshorn and Zürich (Zürichhorn and Schwamendingen).

On 24 May 1920, Émile Taddéoli, the chief pilot for seaplanes, and his mechanic, died during a demonstration flight at an air show in Romanshorn aboard a Savoia flying boat. Financial constraints limited the operations in the first year of operation, and so the Board of Directors recommended on December 23, 1920, to reduce the flight crew to the pilots Pillichody, Cartier and Weber. Operations were limited to the air stations at Zürichhorn and Geneva.

In 1920, the seven pilots of the company did 4,699 tourist flights with 7,384 passengers, resulting in 1,254 hours' flight time and a total distance of about 166,920 kilometres (103,720 mi). Ad Astra Aero closed its first year with a huge loss of 426,365 Swiss francs, and a 410,757-Swiss-franc loss in the second fiscal year. The co-CEO of Ad Astra, Henry Pillichody, made on July 18, 1921, with five passengers the first Alpine passenger flight with the Junkers F.13 airplane in the Bernese Alps.

In the first two years of operational service, aerial photography and charter airline needs were the main focus of operations; in June 1922, the first scheduled flight route Geneva-Zürich-Nuremberg-Fuerth was established. In 1924, Alfred Comte founded the Alfred Comte Flug- und Sportfliegerschule in Oberrieden, Horgen; Walter Mittelholzer became Ad Astra's one and only CEO.

== Flight routes and time of expansion ==
In operational association with Junkers aviation, on 1 June 1922, the Geneva-Zürich route to Fuerth (in September 1922 extended to Berlin) was established with four Junkers F.13, and Ad Astra became the first airline of Switzerland to maintain regular international flights. On behalf of Junkers, scheduled flights to Berlin, Danzig and Riga were established. In April 1924, the air route Zürich-Stuttgart-Frankfurt was established with connections to the route Berlin-Amsterdam. At the same time, the Ad Astra route Geneva-Zürich-Munich got a new intermediate station in Lausanne; on May 15, the line Zürich-Munich-Vienna was admitted to the grid. In 1925, Ad Astra had to separate their operational flights from that of the Trans-European Union, as the Swiss authorities did not pay subsidies for an international company, and therefore Ad Astra had to limit the flights to the line Geneva-Zürich-Munich, exclusively with Swiss aircraft and pilots. However, Ad Astra participated the so-called Europa-Union and became a member of the IATA in 1926. On 14 June 1928, the first serious accident in the Swiss passenger air travel occurred: a Junkers F 13 of the Ad Astra crashed after takeoff at Frankfurt am Main: F. Chardon, the pilot, and three passengers were seriously injured.

== Mittelholzer's Africa flights ==
The Swiss media events of the 1920s were Walter Mittelholzer's Africa flights for aerial photography and cartography purposes. In 1924, he did the first transcontinental flight expedition, starting from the water airport at Zürichhorn via Egypt to South Africa. Mittelholzer's aircraft was a Dornier Merkur (CH-142); it was taken over on March 26, 1931, by the Swissair airline and taken out of service in 1932. In winter 1924/25, Mittelholzer flew to Tehran; the trip lasted a month including two emergency landings. Its flights are considered outstanding technical achievements of its time. In 1930, during another flight to Africa, Walter Mittelholzer was the first pilot to fly over Mount Kilimanjaro.

== Fleet ==
The modern Junkers F.13 (aircraft registration CH-91, CH-92, CH-93 and CH-94) and Junkers G 23 have been leased from Junkers. Besides, Ad Astra Aero concentrated to post and photo flights with smaller machines, some with a decommissioned military aircraft. From Zürichhorn (Zürich-Seefeld) seaplanes were used, among others, two Dornier Merkur B Bal (CH-142/171, the latter was for Mittelholzer's Africa flights equipped with floats), three Fokker F.VII (CH-190/192/193), one BFW/Messerschmitt M18d (CH-191), at least one Comte AC-4 (designed by Alfred Comte), six Lohner flying boats and flying boats of Italian origin, among them seven Macchi-Nieuport and five Savoia flying boats and the first large flying boat, Dornier Wal.

== Merger with Balair to form Swissair ==
On 31 December 1930, the retroactive merger was done with Air Basel AG (Balair), as per decision of the General Assembly on 17 March 1931. The merger was forced by the Swiss Federal Air Administration due to the bad financial situation and also subsidized Balair, to form a new Swiss airline, Swissair, whose technical director became Walter Mittelholzer.
