= Zürichhorn =

River delta on Lake Zurich's eastern shore

Coordinates: 47°21′13″N 8°33′08″E

Zürichhorn is a river delta on Zürichsee's eastern shore in the lower basin of the lake. The area is part of the parks and quays in the Seefeld quarter of the city of Zürich in Switzerland. The gardens are one of the most popular recreational areas within the city of Zürich.

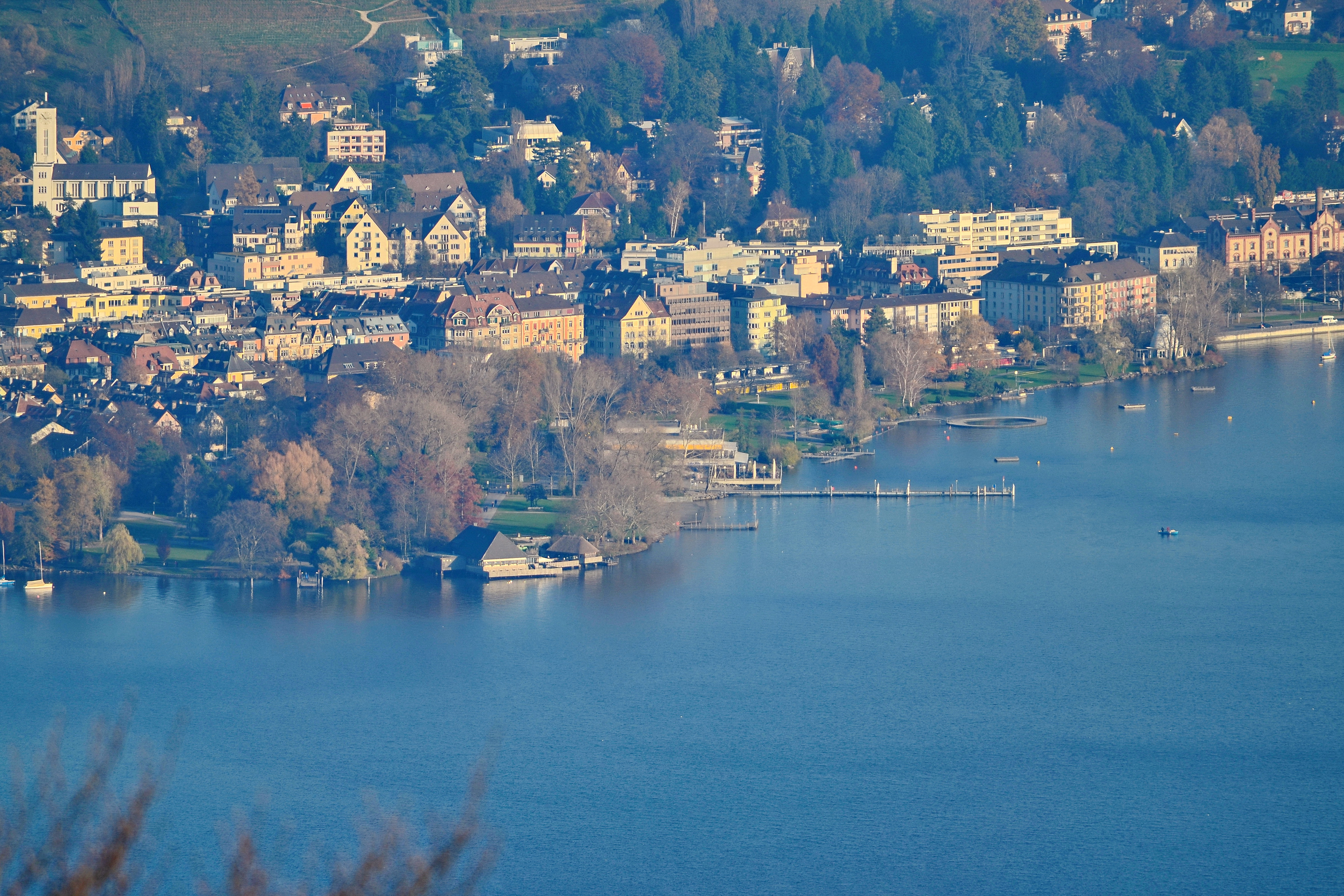
Zürichhorn as seen from Uetliberg

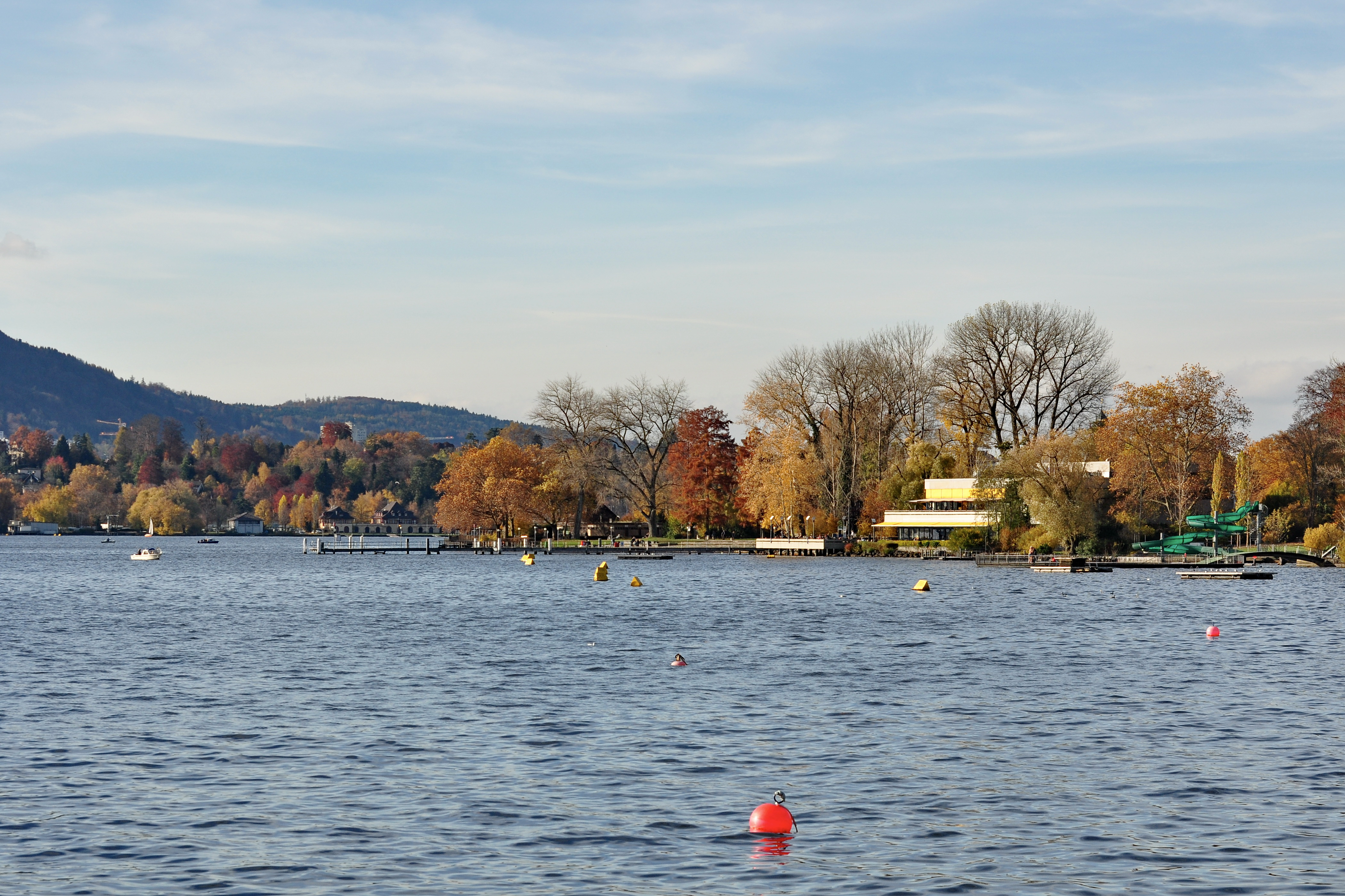
Zürichhorn as seen from Zürich Tiefenbrunnen

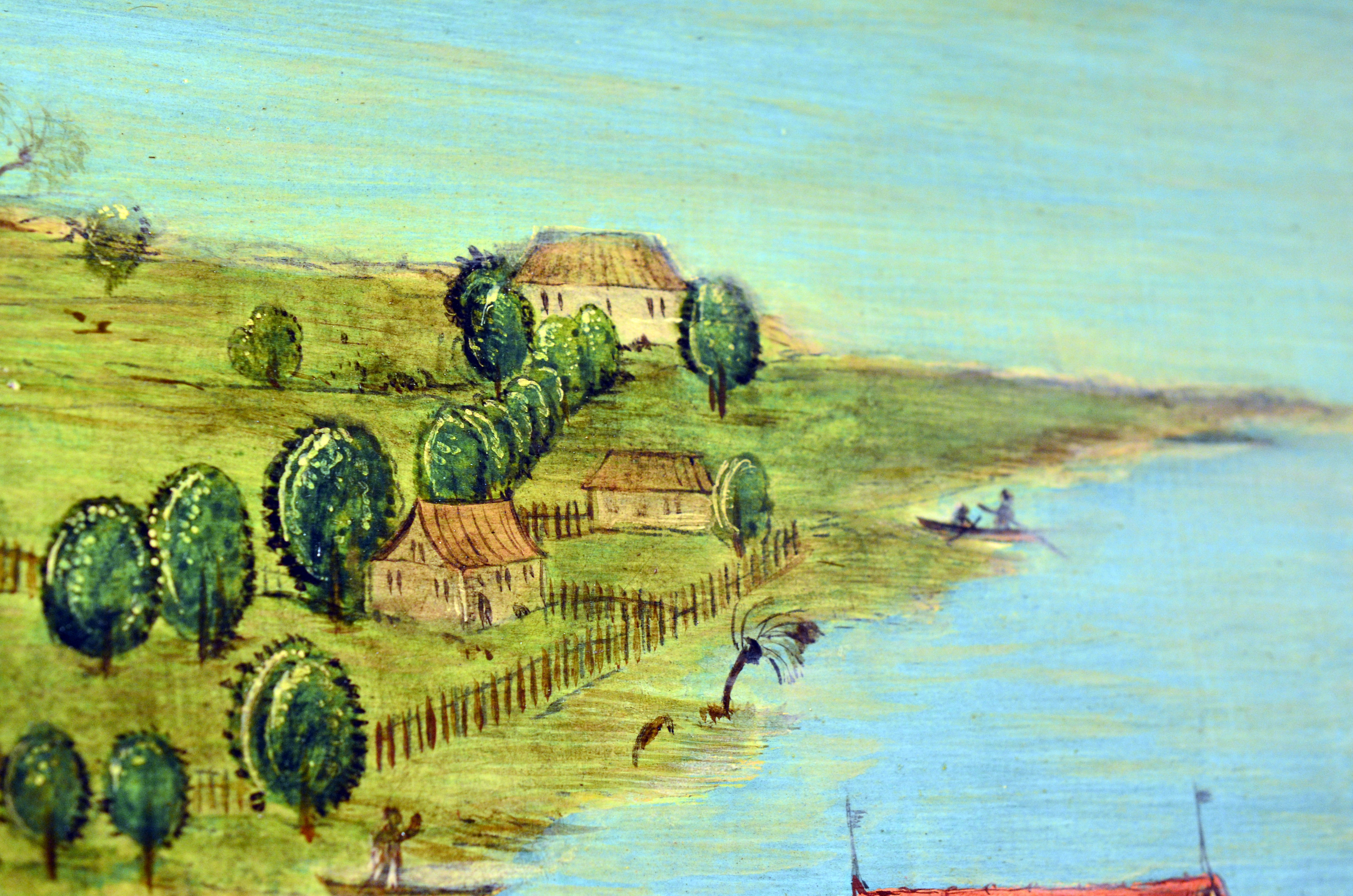
Zürichhorn, early 16th century, Hans Leu the Elder

== Geography ==
Zürichhorn was formed mainly by the Hornbach stream, also known as Wildbach and Werenbach, which flows, as of today embedded into a concrete canal, between Tiefenbrunnen lido and the landing gate of the Zürichsee-Schifffahrtsgesellschaft (ZSG) into Lake Zürich. Ending the last glacial period when the Linth glacier retreated, the Wehrenbach stream dug over through the Linth glacier's moraine, met the rocky ground, the so-called molasse, and by its attachment the river delta at the Zürichhorn respectively the Seefeld quarter was formed.

== Transportation ==
Zürichhorn can be reached preferably by foot (20 minutes from Bellevue) or by public transportation: Zürich tram routes 2 and 4 and bus line 33 to stops Höschgasse or Fröhlichstrasse, or bus lines 912 and 916 from Bellevue to Chinagarten. During Summer season, three Limmat boats provide round trips between Landesmuseum–Wollishofen–Zürichhorn-Landesmuseum on the river Limmat through the city of Zürich respectively Zürichhorn is a stop of the roundtrips on Lake Zürich provided by Zürichsee-Schifffahrtsgesellschaft (ZSG).

== Water airport Zürichhorn ==
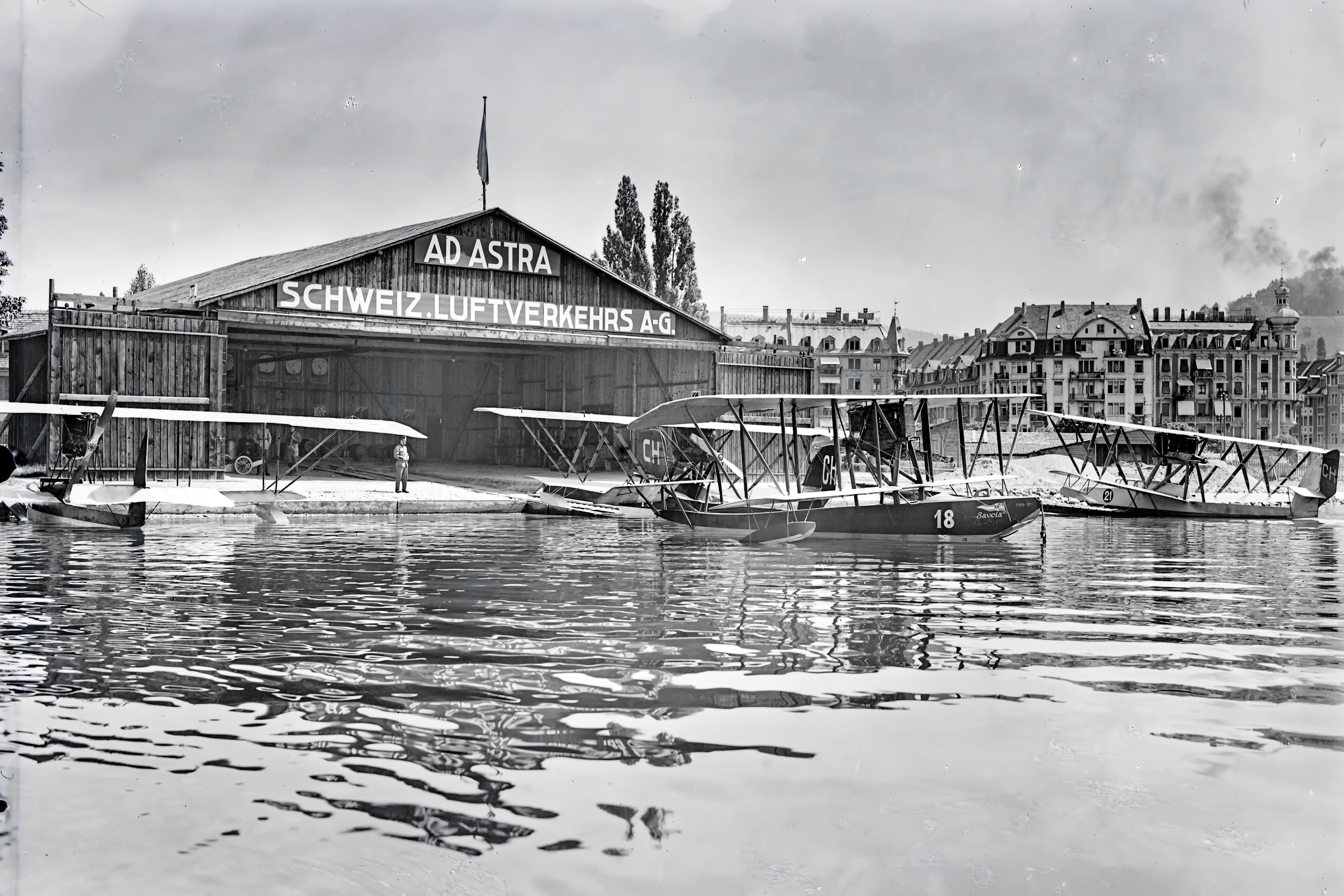
Flying boats of Ad Astra Aero S.A. at Tiefenbrunnen lido, Bellerivestrasse in the background (~1920)

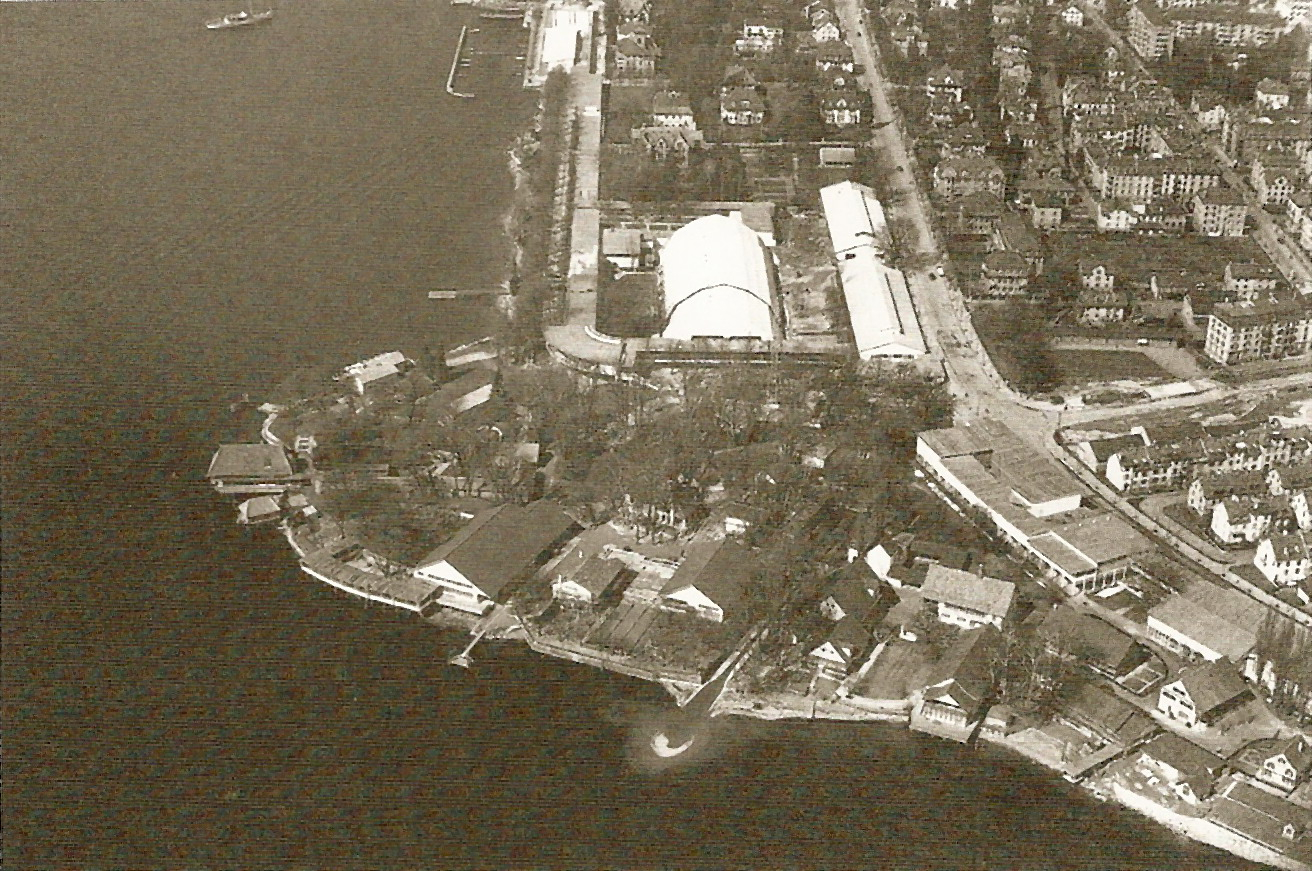
Landidörfli of the Swiss national exhibition in 1939, aerial photography by Walter Mittelholzer

In Summer 1910 Wagenfabrik C. & R. Geissberger provided first test flights with so-called Hydroplanes (flying boats) at Zürichhorn. Initiated by Oskar Bider and Fritz Rihner, in July 1919 the «Schweizerische Gesellschaft für Lufttourismus» was established in Zürich. Tourist flights with flying boats were planned from sites at Zürichhorn, in Geneva, Interlaken/Thun, Locarno, Lugano, Lucerne, Lausanne-Ouchy, Romanshorn and St. Moritz. Switzerland, with its numerous lakes, appeared predestined for the use of seaplanes, so that no expensive airports had to be built. Oskar Bider was killed in an accident before the ambitious project was realized, but from Zürichhorn respectively (as of 2010) the area of the Strandbad Tiefenbrunnen (lido) the Swiss airline Ad Astra Aero operated with seaplanes, among them seven Macchi-Nieuport and five Savoia flying boats and the first large flying boat, Dornier Wal.

== Quaianlagen ==
Hafen Riesbach, meaning Riesbach harbour area is situated between Seefeldquai and Blatterwiese. The harbour itself is as the Enge harbour used as a private-owned marina. In 2004 the old kiosk at the popular open lido at Riesbachstrasse was replaced by a polygonal pavilion was designed by the architects Andreas Furrimann and Gabrielle Hächler, and now houses a small restaurant. As well as the Seefeldquai, it is part of the historical Quaianlagen, and combines park designs from different design periods. The stone pillar Klausstud originally stood in the lake and served as a border designation of the medieval right of ban of the city republic of Zürich. At that place also ended the fishing rights of the urban fishermen, and from here the Einsiedeln Abbey pilgrims proved their honour to the Protestantic city by lowering the volume of their prayers and songs. Since the landfills in the construction of the quais, the pillar stands in the middle of the park. The sculpture by Henry Moore named Sheep Peace was donated in 1976. The Pavillon Le Corbusier, an art museum dedicated to the work of the Swiss architect Le Corbusier, is situated between Seefeldquai and Blatterwiese. Between Blatterwiese and Bellerivestrasse, in 1993 the Chinese Garden Zürich was inaugurated.

Sights include the spacious parks and quais with various sculptures including Jean Tinguely's Heureka, Chinagarten Zürich at Blatterwiese, and in the northeast the last Le Corbusier-designed building, the formerly named Heidi-Weber-Museum now Pavillon Le Corbusier. On the southeastern side of the delta is the Strandbad Tiefenbrunnen. The Restaurant Fischstube was built as part of the Swiss national exhibition 1939 and is claimed to be the only house within the city of Zürich with a thatched roof.

Among the many major events at Zürichhorn are the Schweizerische Landesausstellung 1939 (Swiss national exposition, commonly Landi39), Schweizerische Gartenbauausstellung G59 in 1959, and in 1991 the national research exhibition Heureka. Since 1989, Kino am See (cinema on lake), the largest open-air cinema in Switzerland, takes place between mid-July and mid-August at Zürichhorn on the Lake Zürich shore. The lakeside parks are annually frequented by 2.5 million visitors.

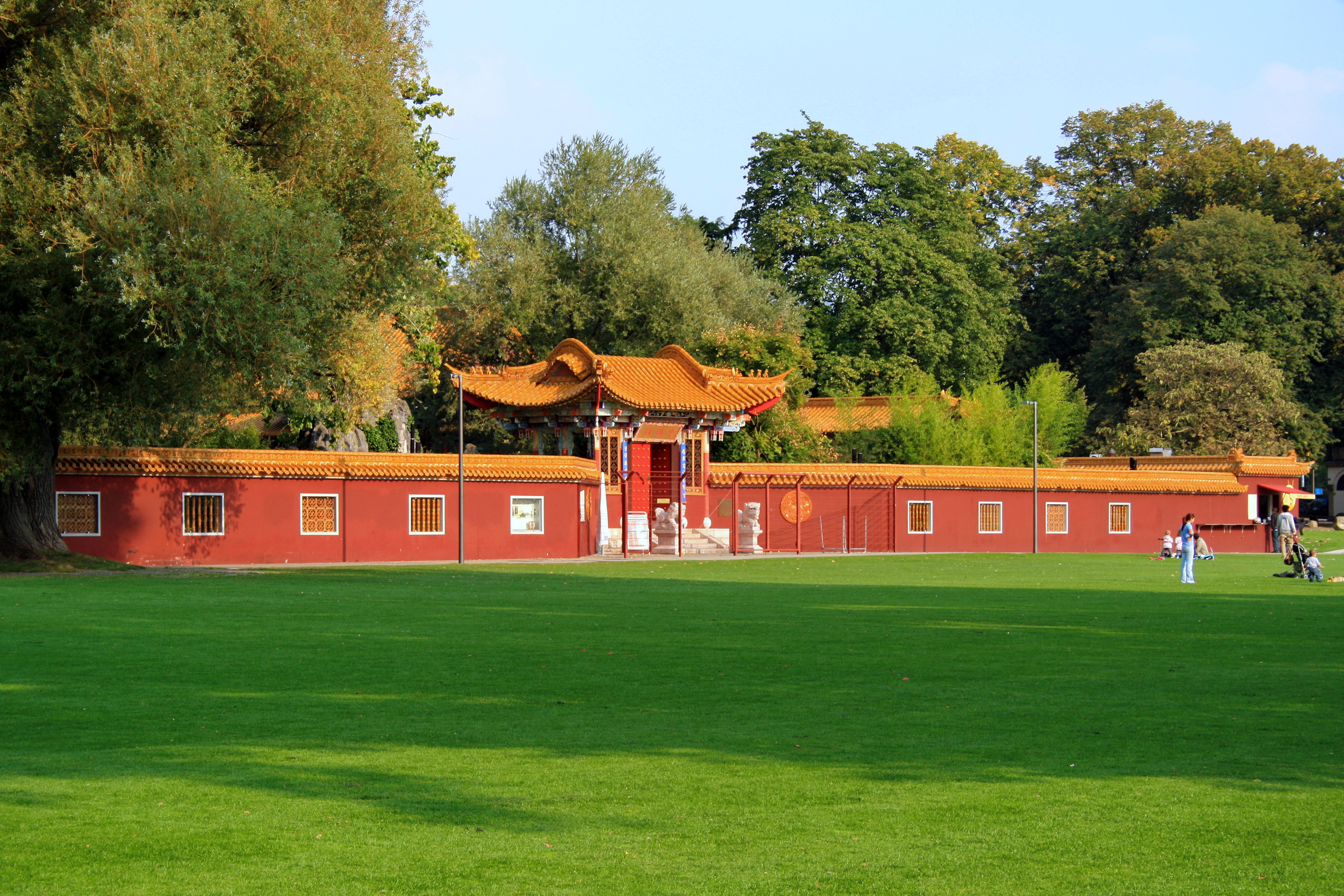
Chinese Garden

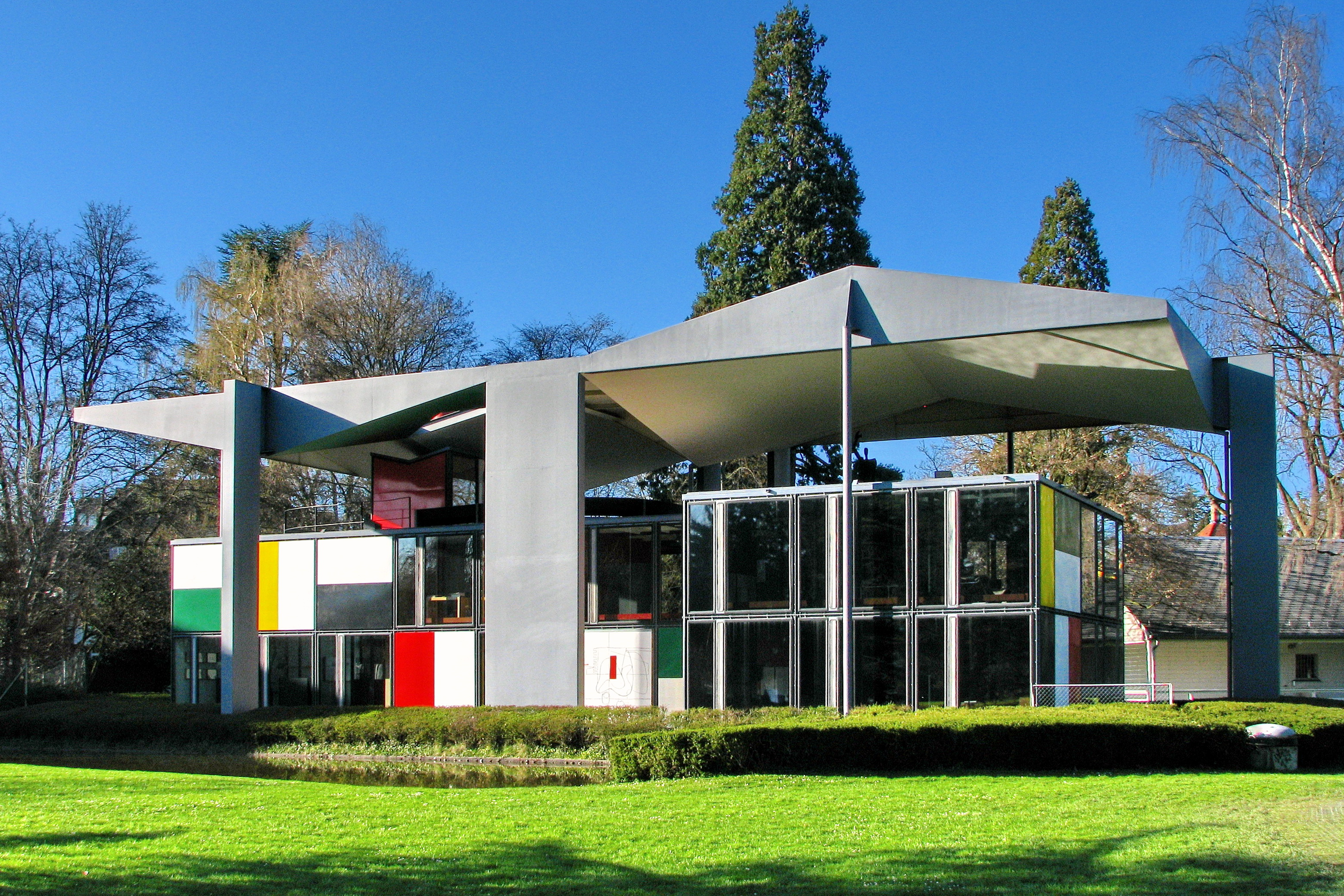
Pavillon Le Corbusier

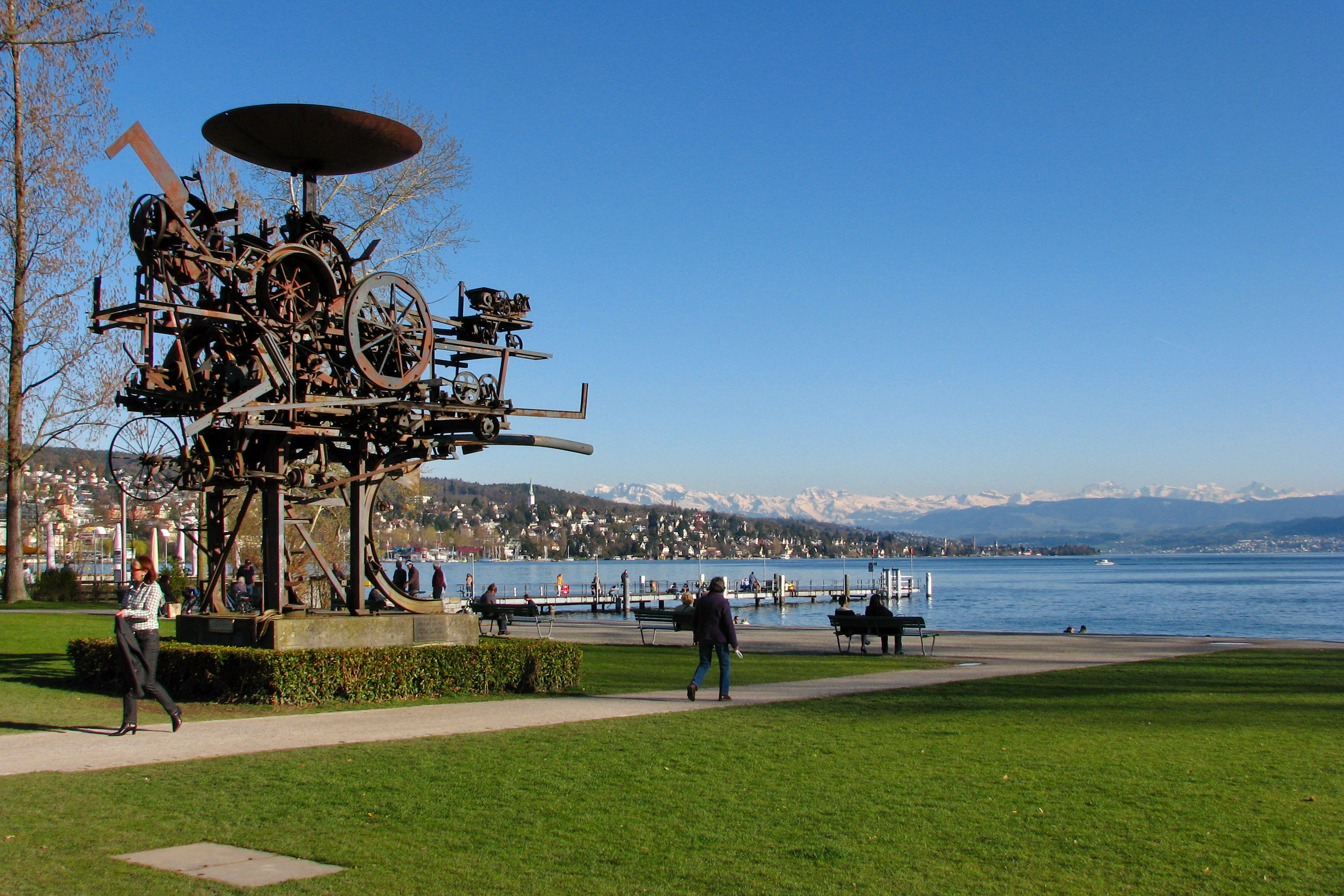
Jean Tinguely's Heureka

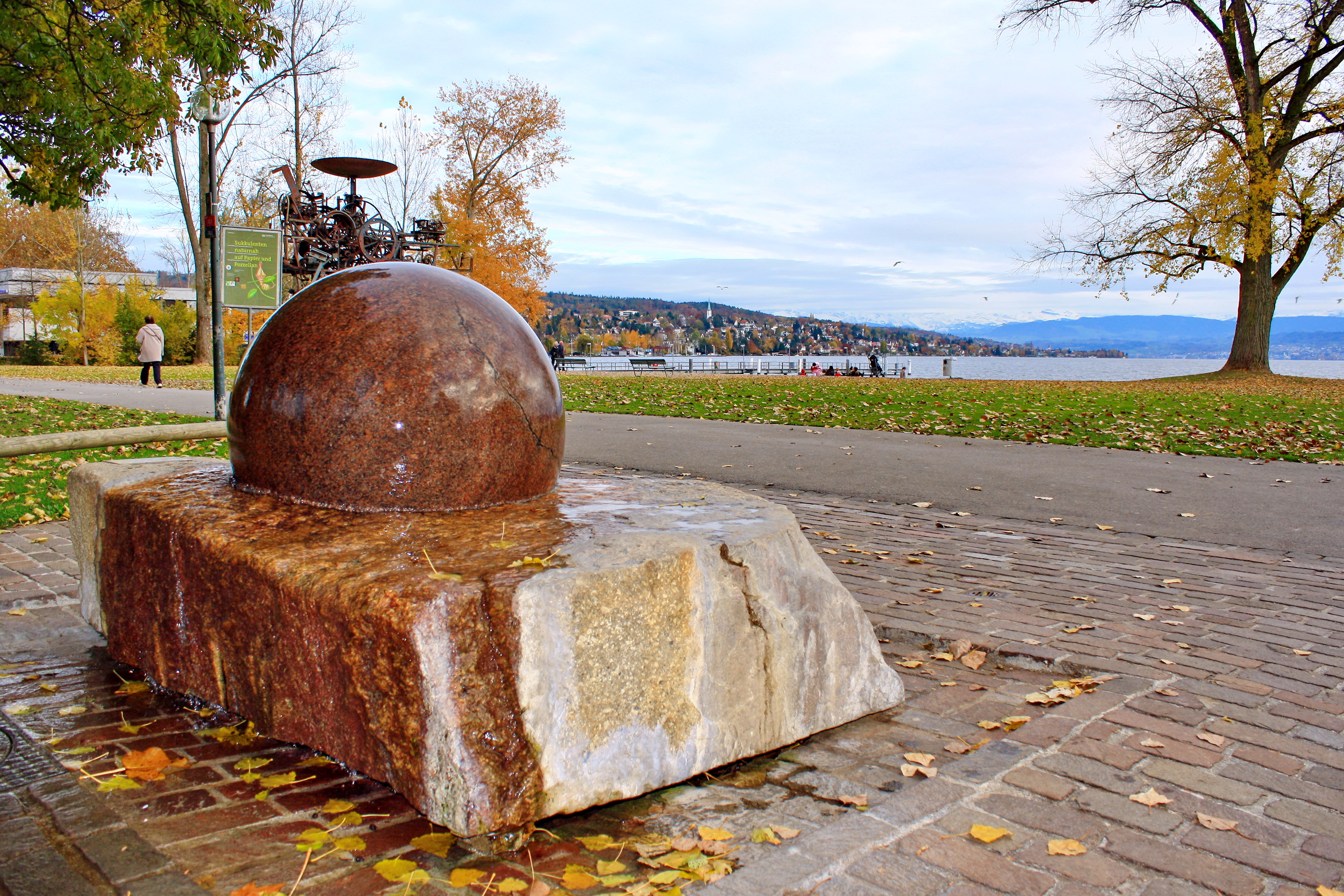
Kugelbrunnen, a relict of the Phenomena exhibition of 1984

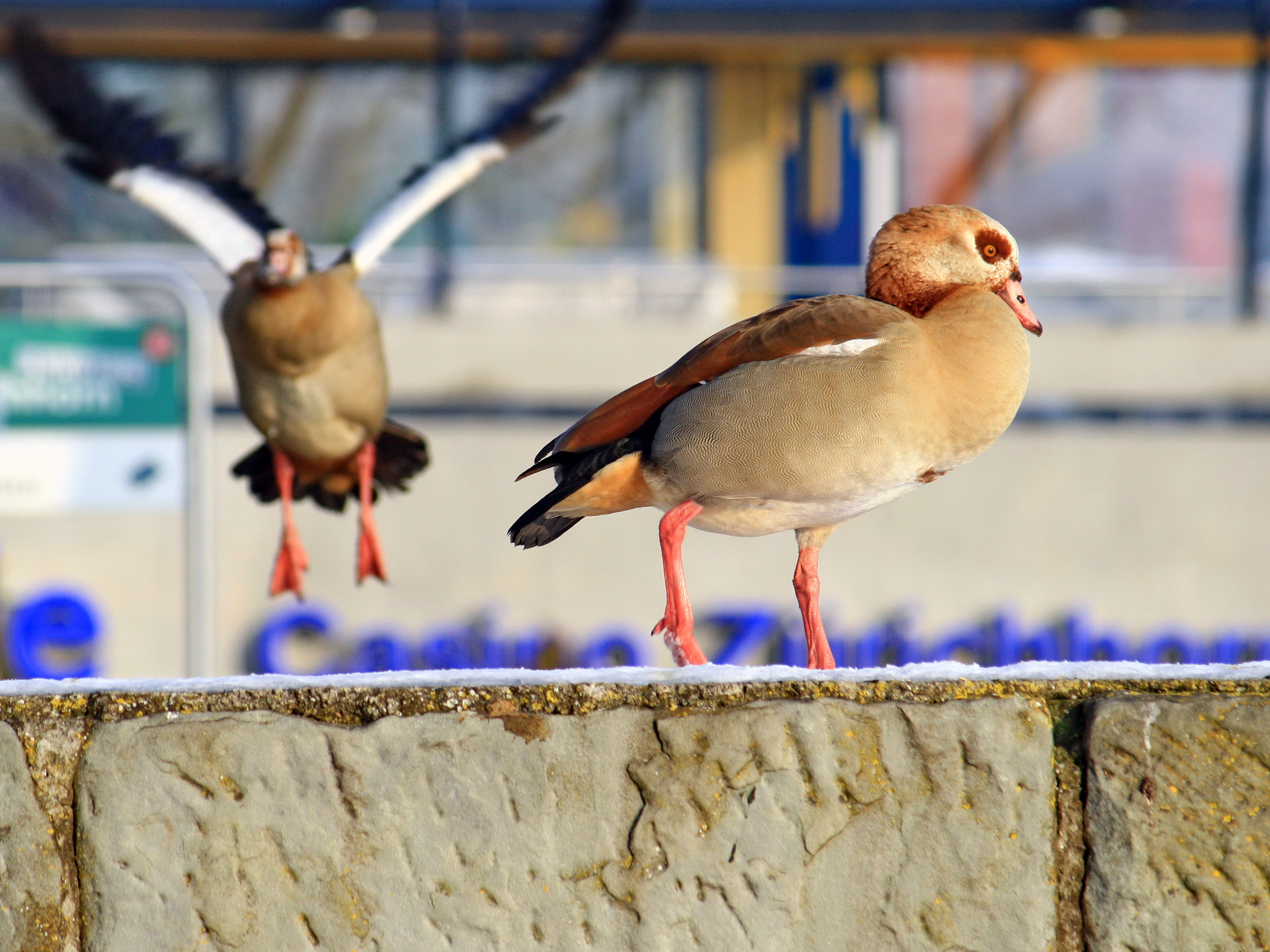
Alopochen aegyptiacus at Zürichhorn

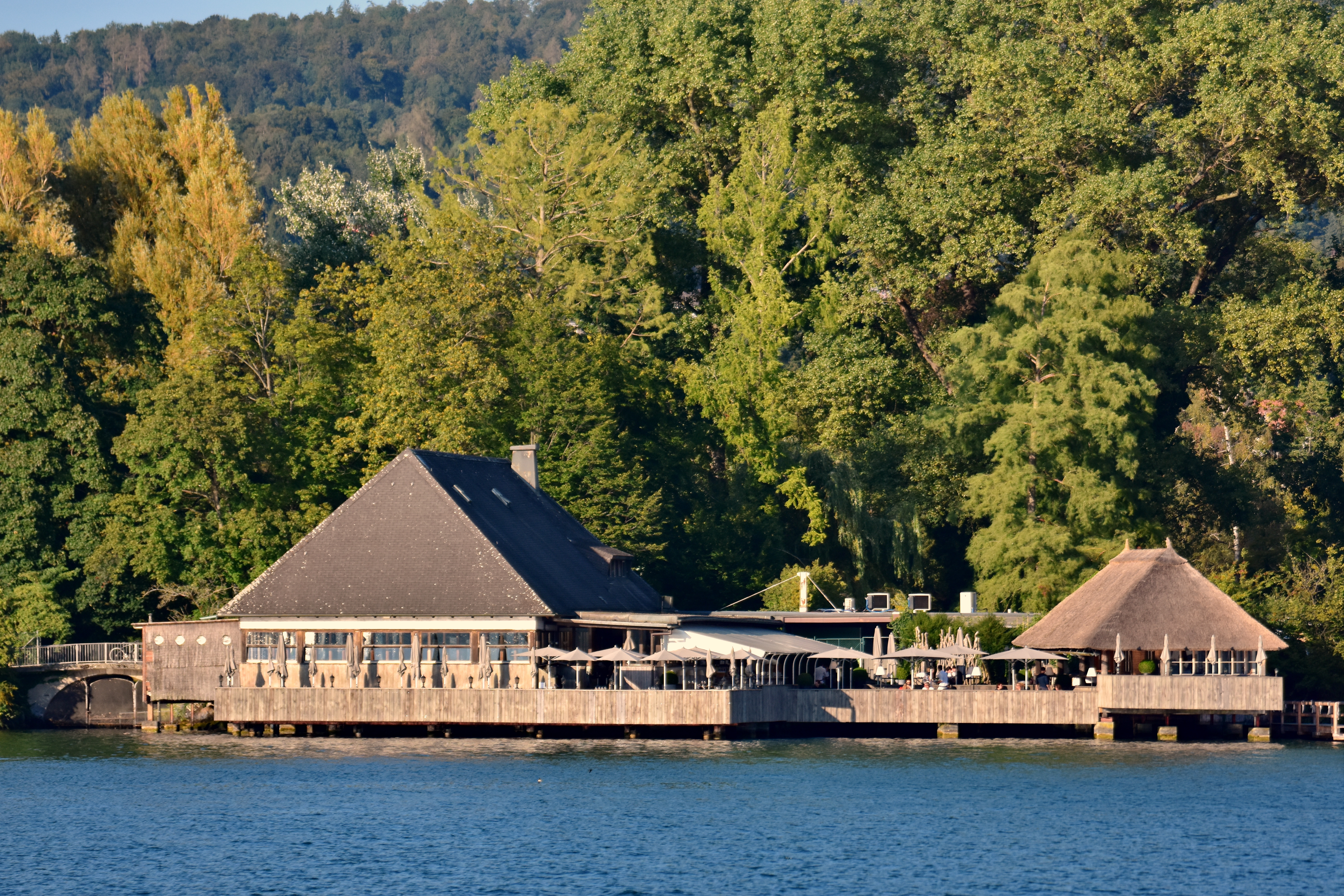
Restaurant Fischstube

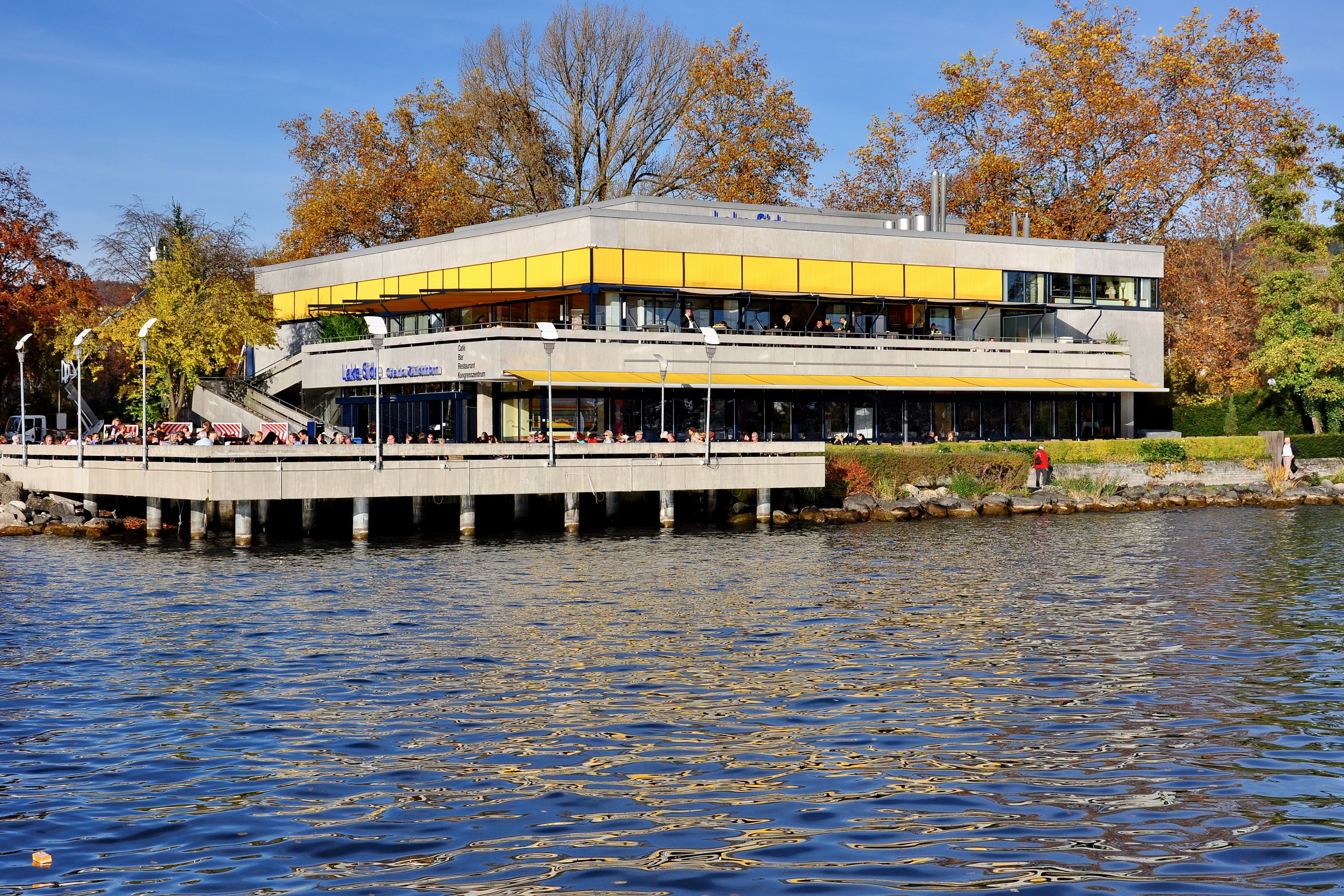
Casino Lake Side Zürichhorn

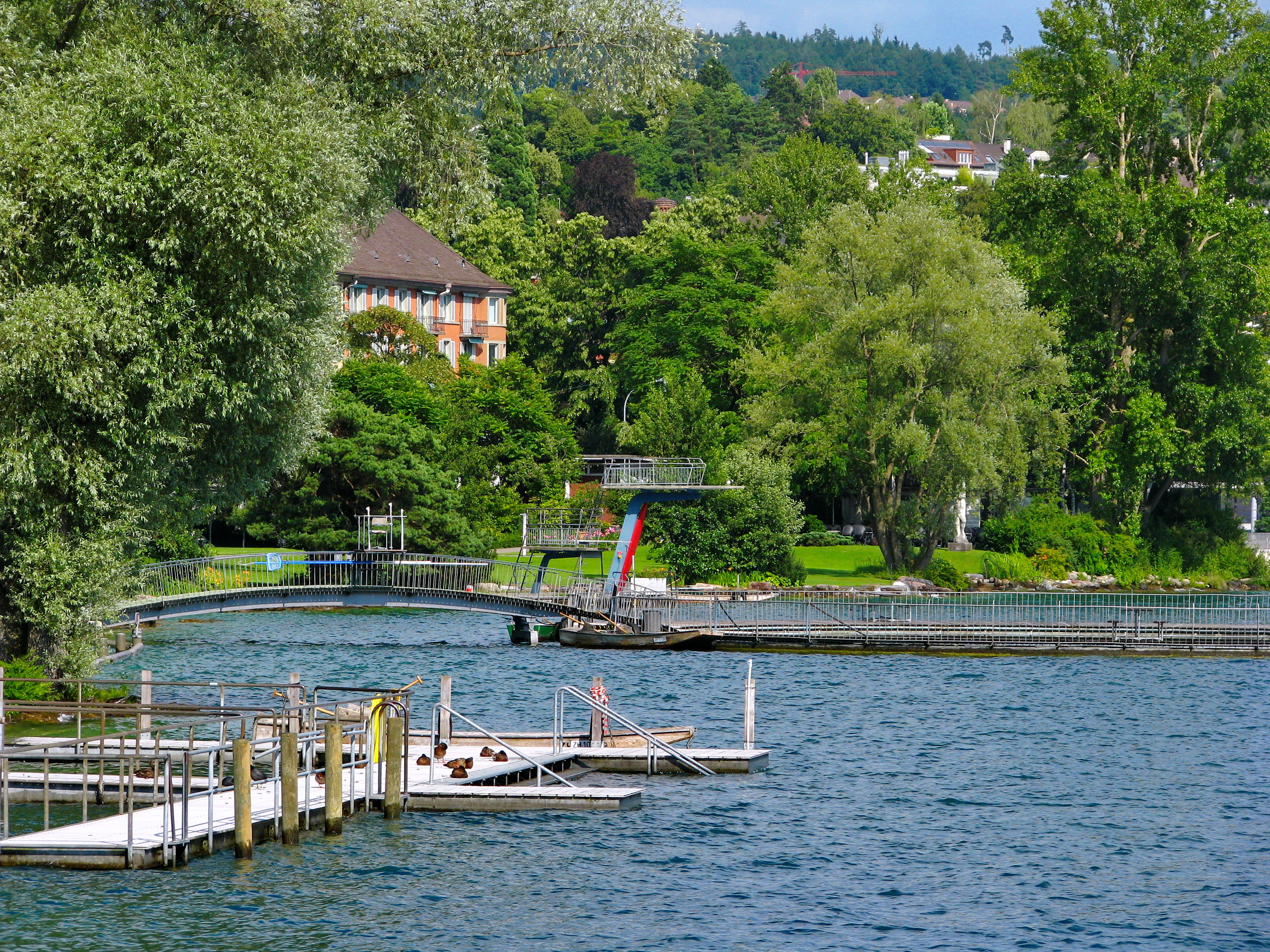
Strandbad Tiefenbrunnen lido

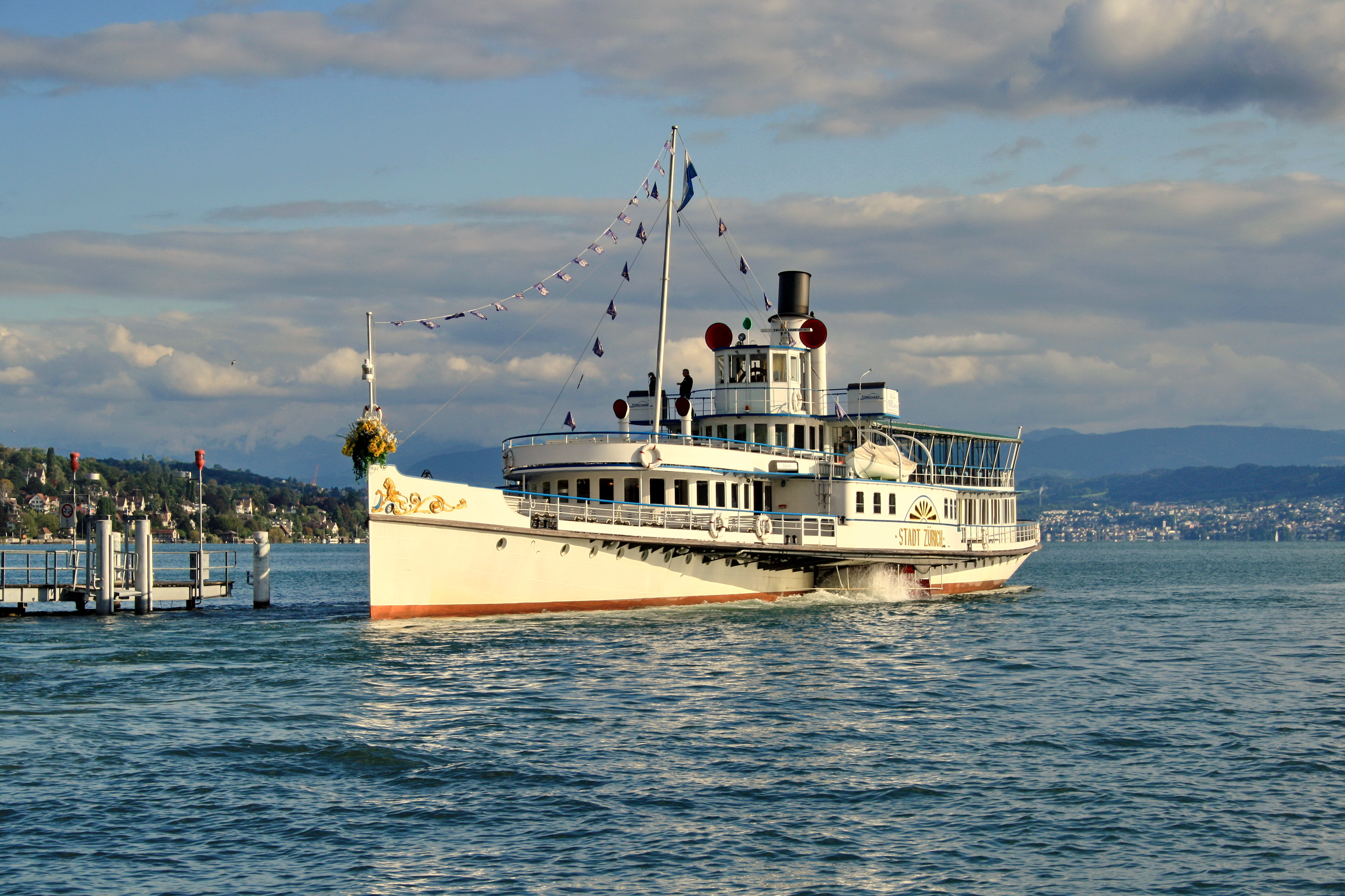
ZSG Paddle steamer Stadt Zürich at Zürichhorn landing gate

== History ==
In 1238 the Otinbach stream is first mentioned, which can be derived from "Otto's stream", from Old High German ôt meaning heritage. The then used name Oetenbach may refer to the river on whose banks an estate, fishing or other rights were situated. About the same time, at Zürichhorn the Oetenbach Nunnery was established, lacking experience on swampy ground; therefore around 1280/85 the Dominican sisters of the convent moved to Sihlbühl at Lindenhof hill within the fortifications of the city of Zürich, and also to finance the northern town wall.

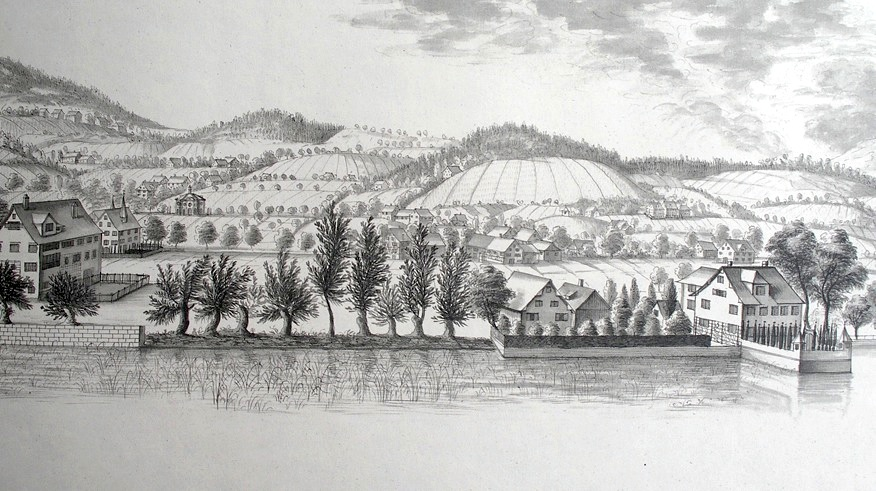
«Solitude» estate, as of today Museum Bellerive, Seefeld-Quai to the left (1771)

In the 16/17th century rich Zürich citizens built their country seats outside the town walls of the city of Zürich on lakeshore in the Seefeld quarter. In the 1840s several construction companies settled around Zürichhorn: raw material was delivered on the lake respectively shore-based on (as of today) Fröhlichstrasse. The then Hornegg was developed until the end of the 19th century as the local center of construction and ship building companies. In 1894 the railway line Rechtsufrige Zürichseebahn was established, and since then most of the companies have moved to the more attractive Industriequartier in the western parts of the city of Zürich.

1879/81 the Wildbach was corrected to avoid recurrent flooding of the former municipality of Riesbach (as of today Zürich's district number 8). The stream was discharged to the south of Lake Zürich, and from then, it was called Hornbach nearby its mouth. Opening the Lake Zürich quais, in 1887 the park area was expanded from Seefeld-Quai to Zürichhorn, in order to promote companionship, recreation and amusement. A spacious park landscape was built by the landscape architects Otto Froebel and Evariste Mertens.

== Cultural heritage of national importance ==
Zürichhorn is listed in the Swiss inventory of cultural property of national and regional significance as a Class A object of national importance.
