= Comte AC-1 =

1920s Swiss single-seat monoplane fighter aircraft produced by Flugzeugbau A. Comte

AC-1
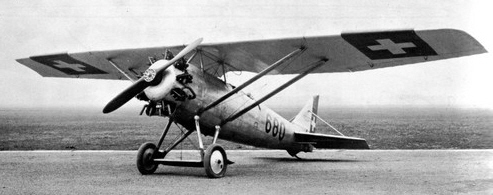

General information
- Type: single-seat fighter
- Manufacturer: Comte
- Primary user: Swiss Fliegertruppe
- Number built: 1

History
- First flight: 2 April 1927

The Comte AC-1 was a 1920s Swiss single-seat monoplane fighter aircraft produced by Flugzeugbau A. Comte.

== Design and development ==
The Swiss company Flugzeugbau A. Comte was established in the early 1920s to build German aircraft designs under licence. The company's first original design was the Comte AC-1, developed to meet a Swiss Fliegertruppe (Swiss Air Force) requirement for a single-seat fighter.

The AC-1 was a high-wing monoplane with fixed tailskid undercarriage. It was constructed of metal with fabric-covered wing and tail surfaces. The powerplant was a Gnome et Rhône radial engine driving a fixed-pitched two-blade propeller.

The AC-1 prototype first flew on 1927. Testing and evaluation did not result in any orders but the prototype was bought by the Swiss Fliegertrupppe. The prototype was the only unit constructed of this type.

== Operational history ==
The prototype was acquired by the Swiss Fliegetruppe and later had the wing replaced with a wing from a Dewoitine D.9. With the new wing the aircraft was used to establish a Swiss altitude record on 19 November 1928.

== Operators ==
Switzerland

- Swiss Fliegertruppe

== Specifications (AC-1) ==
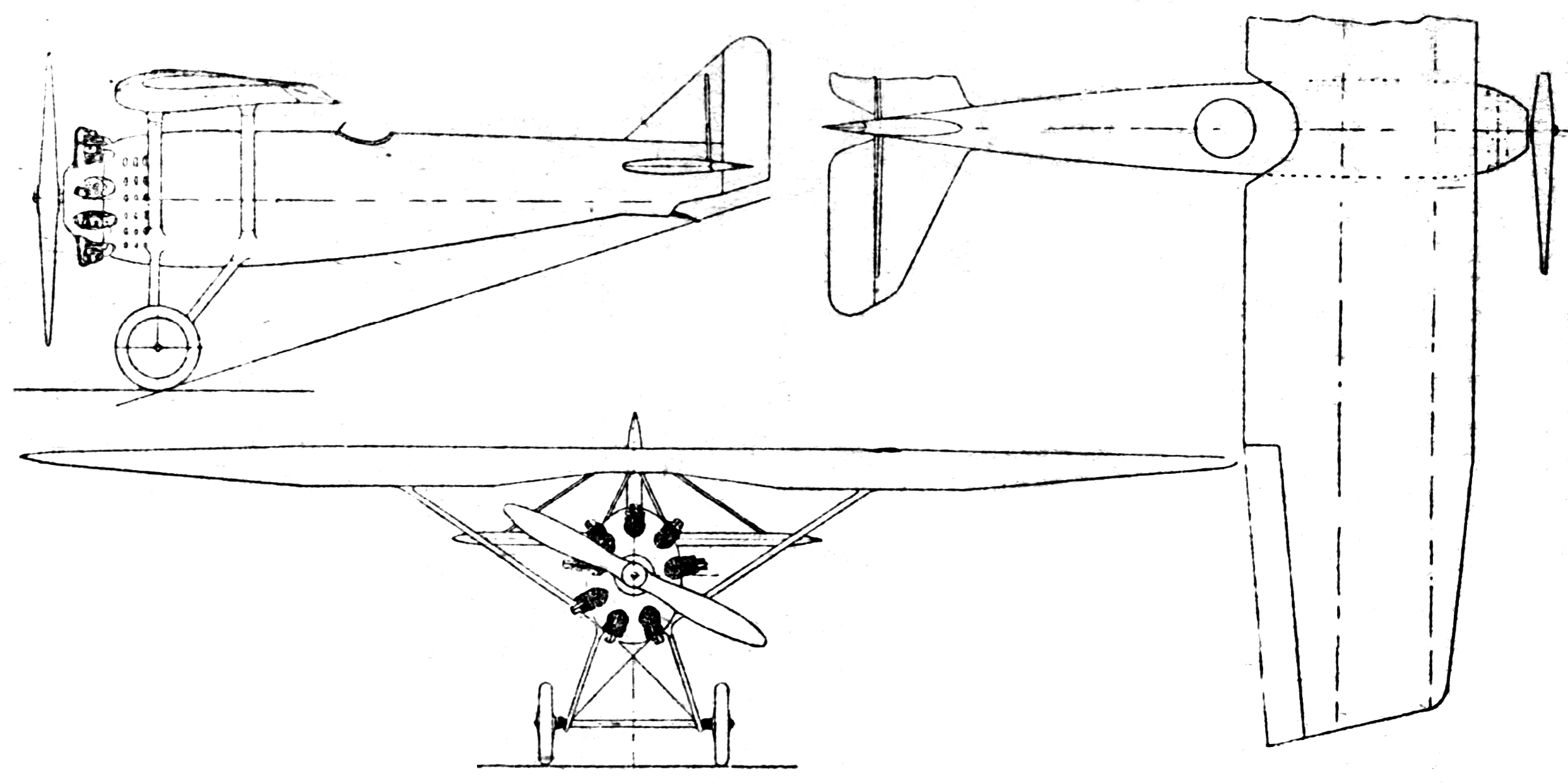
Comte AC-1 3-view drawing from L'Air 1 August 1926

General characteristics

- Crew: 1
- Length: 7.13 m (23 ft 5 in)
- Wingspan: 12 m (39 ft 4 in)
- Height: 3.12 m (10 ft 3 in)
- Wing area: 24 m^{2} (260 sq ft)
- Empty weight: 920 kg (2,028 lb)
- Max takeoff weight: 1,320 kg (2,910 lb)
- Powerplant: 1 × Gnome et Rhône 9A Jupiter IX 9-cylinder air-cooled radial piston engine, 313 kW (420 hp)
- Propellers: 2-bladed fixed-pitch propeller

Performance

- Maximum speed: 245 km/h (152 mph, 132 kn)
- Range: 450 km (280 mi, 240 nmi)

Armament

- Guns: intended to be two forward-firing machine guns
