= Comte AC-4 =

1920s aircraft

AC-4 Gentleman
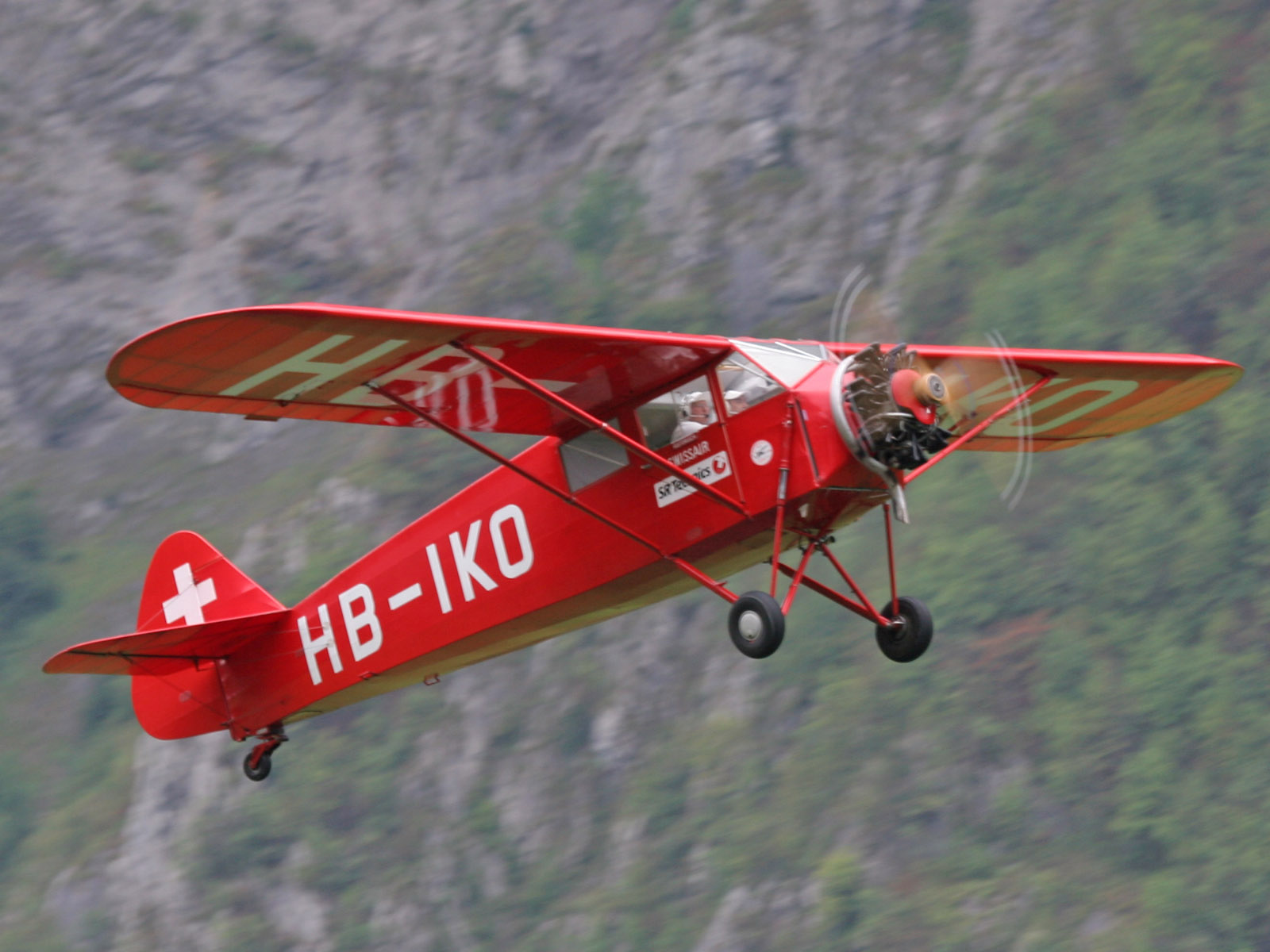

General information
- Type: Two-seat sport/training aircraft
- National origin: Switzerland
- Manufacturer: Comte
- Primary user: Switzerland

History
- First flight: 1927

The Comte AC-4 Gentleman is a 1920s Swiss two-seat sport/training aircraft produced by Flugzeugbau A. Comte.

== Design and development ==
In 1927 the Swiss company Flugzeugbau A. Comte designed and built a prototype two-seat cabin monoplane designated the AC-4 Gentleman. It was a braced high-wing monoplane with fixed tailwheel landing gear. It had staggered seats for two with an option for dual controls.

== Variants ==
AC-4
Production version with a 115 hp (86 kW) Cirrus Hermes inline piston engine.
AC-4B
Second production batch with 140 hp (104 kW) Armstrong Siddeley Genet Major or 110 hp (82 kW) Cirrus Hermes, five built.

== Operators ==
Switzerland

- Swiss Air Force

== Specifications (AC-4) ==
General characteristics

- Crew: Two
- Length: 26 ft 5 in (8.05 m)
- Wingspan: 39 ft 9.5 in (12.13 m)
- Height: 9 ft 6 in (2.90 m)
- Wing area: 215.29 sq ft (20 m^{2})
- Empty weight: 1,102 lb (500 kg)
- Gross weight: 1,764 lb (800 kg)
- Powerplant: 1 × Cirrus Hermes inline piston , 115 hp (86 kW)

Performance

- Maximum speed: 109 mph (175 km/h, 95 kn)
- Cruise speed: 87 mph (140 km/h, 76 kn)
- Range: 435 mi (700 km, 378 nmi)
- Service ceiling: 13,125 ft (4,000 m)

== See also ==
Related development

- Comte AC-8
- Comte AC-12
