= Comte AC-3 =

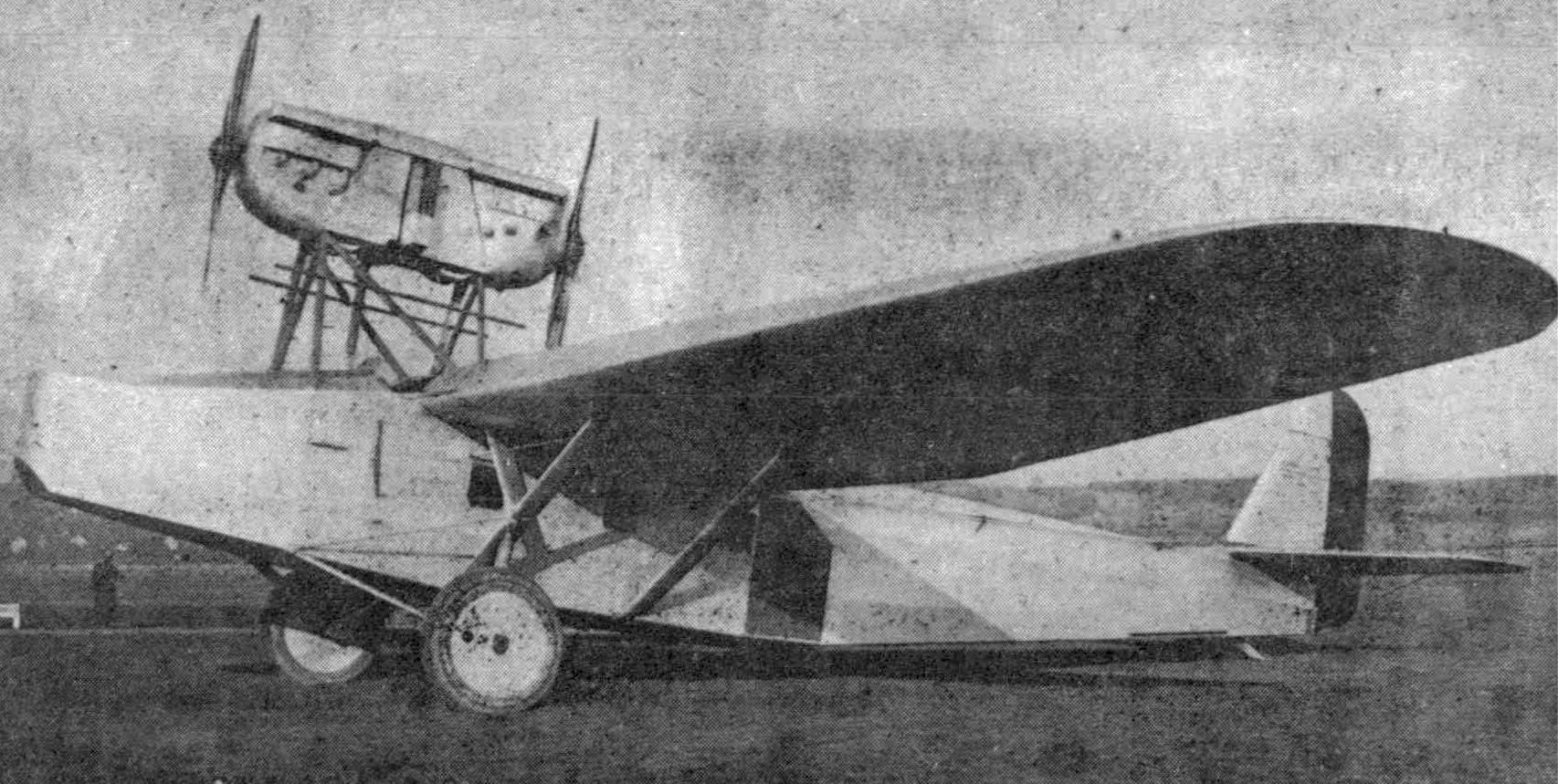

General information
- Type: Bomber/transport aircraft
- Manufacturer: Comte
- Primary user: Bolivian Air Force
- Number built: 1

History
- First flight: 1930

The Comte AC-3 was a bomber and transport aircraft designed and produced by the Swiss aircraft manufacturer Flugzeugbau A. Comte.

The AC-3 was a high-wing semi-cantilever monoplane of mixed construction. It was fabric covered and had a conventional tail unit. It had three open cockpits, one in the nose for a gunner or observer, one forward of the wing for a pilot, and one on the upper rear fuselage for a rear gunner. It used an unconventional engine layout that placed a pair of 447 kW (600 hp) Hispano-Suiza inline piston engines positioned in tandem supported on eight struts above the fuselage. The installation had to be high enough to allow clearance for the two (one pusher, one tractor) propellers above the fuselage. A hatch in the port side allowed cargo or troops to be carried in the main cabin.

== Design and development ==
In November 1928, as a response to increasing tensions and clashes between troops in the Gran Chaco border region between Bolivia and Paraguay, Bolivia placed an order with Alfred Comte, the owner of a small Swiss aircraft manufacturer for three long-range bomber-transport aircraft, using funds that were collected by popular subscription.

In terms of its general configuration, the Comte AC-3 was a high-wing monoplane that was powered by a pair of Hispano-Suiza inline engines that were mounted in tandem above the fuselage. The nose of the aircraft contained a station for a single machine gunner while a second gunner was seated towards the rear; communication between the front and rear gunners’ positions during flight was facilitated by a passageway that ran underneath the pilots' seats. The two pilots were located on the same level as the nose gunner’s station, which were seated abreast in a position that was both forward of and above the wing to achieve favourable visibility. Aft of the forward wing spar, the fuselage could be configured in a variety of manners to suit the aircraft’s intended purpose.

The AC-3 could carry up to 2,000 kg (4,410 lb.) of bombs or to transport a maximum of 15 fully equipped soldiers. It was also capable of being outfitted for the air ambulance role, in which capacity it could carry up to six casualties either on couches or stretchers. The usage of the aircraft as a utility transport was also envisioned. Aside from military application, the AC-3 was also potentially useful for civil operations, including commercial and scientific purposes, such as the exploration of unfamiliar terrain and the assistance of individuals out on the frontier.

Within the space between the wing spars was a trapdoor in the bottom of the fuselage; this was to facilitate the loading of large objects, such as engines and stretchers, on to the aircraft. When fitted, the bomb rack was also to be installed over the trapdoor, being positioned at the aircraft’s centre of gravity. The bombardier’s station was beneath the wing; it was provisioned with six windows (composed of cellon) and was entered via a sizable door on the lefthand side of the fuselage that was large enough to accommodate even the largest bombs then in service. Separately, towards the rear of the cabin, a single side-door entrance to the fuselage was also provided.

The fuselage, which was rectangular, was supported by a framework made up of welded steel tubes that were braced using additional welded tubing. The forward portion of the fuselage was covered with sheet aluminium while the remainder of the exterior mainly used fabric instead. The cabin was lined with plywood up to the level of the windows.

The aircraft’s twin engines were mounted centrally; even with only a single operational engine, the aircraft’s controllability and most other flight characteristics remained nominal and reasonably comfortable for the pilots to fly. The engines were placed within a nacelle, composed of steel tubing and mounted on sturdy supports above the forward wing spar. Access to the engines was possible even mid-flight from the middle of the nacelle, which was relatively protected from wind and most dangers to permit the mechanic to perform repair work or inspect the engines; this facility was promoted as bolstering the reliability of the power plant. Cooling was achieved via honeycomb-style radiators that were attached to either side of the engine nacelle. The oil radiators, which were equipped with fins, were attached to the underside of the engines level with the oil tanks.

Fuel was stored within a pair of 1000-liter (264-gallon) fuel tanks, each one was located within the inner wing relatively close to the fuselage. Riveted sheet duralumin was used for all of the tanks while a mixture of aluminum and copper pipes were fitted using flexible metal joints. The main tanks were outfitted with rapid-emptying mechanisms to perform fuel dumps when required. Fuel was supplied from the main tanks via engine-driven pumps; each engine drove a pair of pumps. An auxiliary fuel pump was present in the cabin.

The contour of the wing was an irregular trapezoid with semi-circular tips. In terms of its profile, it was relatively thick towards the fuselage and reduced only on the lower side from this point to the wing tips. Orthodox wooden construction was used for the wings, the covering being fabric. Both of the box spars were braced using a combination of steel tubes and wires to form rigid supports for the ribs. The wings were hinged to the top of the fuselage and were supported on each side by a pair of struts made of steel tubing that attached to the wing at a short distance from the fuselage to leave a long overhang. The ailerons, which were narrow, long, and unbalanced, were actuated using cables. These ailerons were hinged to auxiliary spars that ran parallel to the wing’s trailing edge.

The landing gear was relatively sturdy and simplistic. The shock absorbers comprised a pair of vertical spring struts that had a maximum travel of 20 cm (7.87 in.). It was fitted with Palmer wheels to facilitate taking off and landing upon rough ground and austere airstrips. All of the aircraft’s wooden portions were protected against both heat and moisture by three coats of the best wood-filling paint. The safety factor of the airplane satisfied the most exacting requirements for bomber aircraft of the era.

The horizontal empennage comprised an adjustable stabilizer and a two-part balanced elevator while the vertical empennage consisted of a fin and a balanced rudder. The flight control surfaces were actuated via a series of flexible cables that ran along the walls of the fuselage. The tail surfaces were of mixed construction, which included steel spars, wooden ribs and a fabric covering. The stabilizer was braced from both above and below by wires that attached to the top of the fin and the bottom of the fuselage.

The new aircraft was too large to be built in Comte's existing factory, (the AC-3 was the largest aircraft ever to be developed and built in Switzerland) and forced Comte to build a new hangar just for the AC-3. It made its maiden flight from Dübendorf airfield on 22 February 1930. The aircraft failed to meet its expected top speed, and as a result it was refitted with four-bladed propellers instead of the original two-bladed items. A collapse in the price of tin resulted in severe financial problems in Bolivia, leading to the military junta ruling Bolivia cancelled the order for the three Comte bombers, with only the first example being built, which was dismantled in 1935.

== Operators ==
Bolivia

- Bolivian Air Force

== Specifications ==
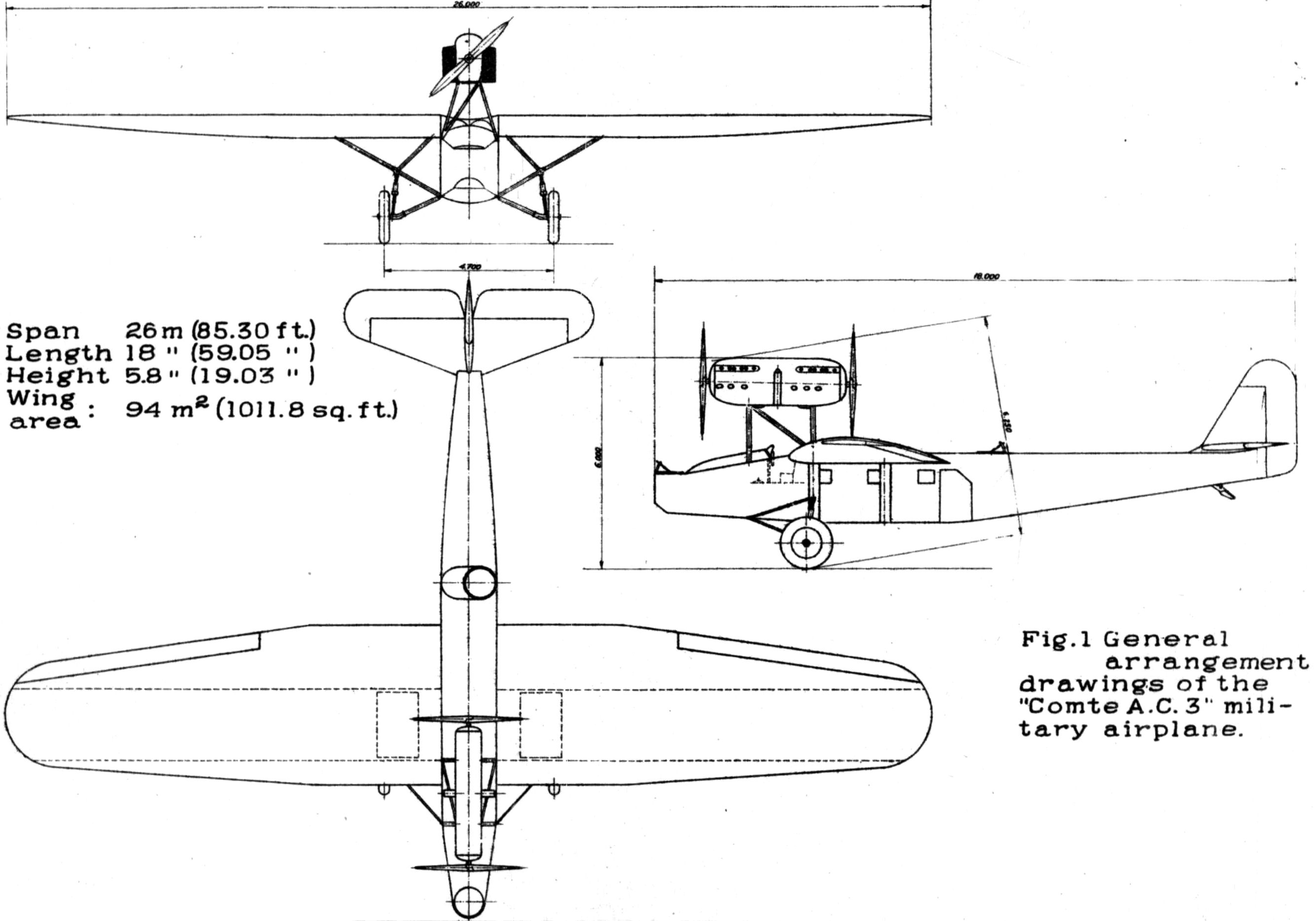
Comte AC-3 3-view drawing from NACA Aircraft Circular No.122

Data from National Advisory Committee for Aeronautics

General characteristics

- Crew: three
- Length: 18 m (59 ft 0.75 in)
- Wingspan: 26 m (85 ft 3 in)
- Height: 6.0 m (19 ft 8.25 in)
- Wing area: 95 m^{2} (1,022 sq ft)
- Empty weight: 4,000 kg (8,818 lb)
- Gross weight: 6,500 kg (14,330 lb)
- Powerplant: 2 × Hispano-Suiza inline piston , 447 kW (600 hp) each

Performance

- Maximum speed: 210 km/h (130 mph, 110 kn)
- Range: 1,500 km (932 mi, 810 nmi)
- Service ceiling: 5,300 m (17,390 ft)
