= Alfred Comte =

Swiss aviation pioneer (1895–1965)

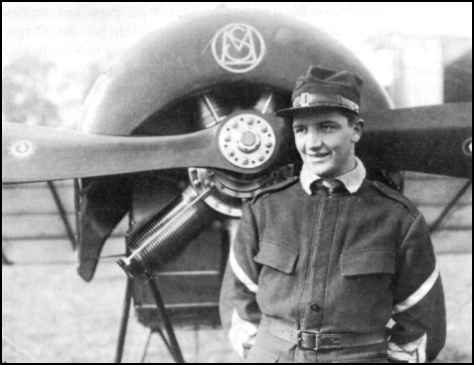
- Alfred Comte in August 1914
- Born: 4 June 1895; Delémont, Switzerland
- Died: 1 November 1965 (aged 70); Zürich, Switzerland
- Occupations: Pilot, entrepreur, engineer
- Known for: Aviation entrepreneur (Ad Astra Aero S.A.) construction of civilian and military aircraft
- Relatives: Michel Comte (grandson)

Alfred Comte (4 June 1895 – 1 November 1965) was a Swiss aviation pioneer. He was active as a pilot, photographer, instructor, and also as one of the first aviation entrepreneurs. He was successful in the construction of civilian and military aircraft.

== Early life and education ==
Comte was born 4 June 1895 in Delémont, Switzerland, to Paul Comte, a district manager for the Swiss Federal Railways, and Elisa Comte (née Bourquard). His paternal family originally hailed from Courtételle.

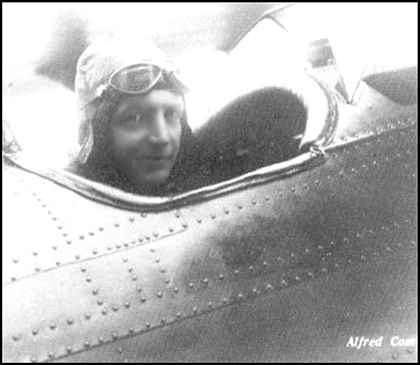
Comte piloting a Comte AC-2 aircraft (~1926)

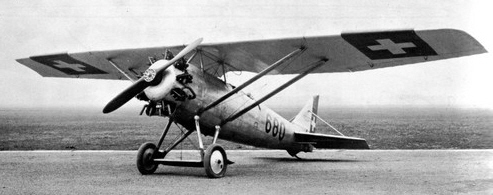
Comte AC-1

== Life ==
At the age of 15, Alfred Comte built a motorized bicycle. Comte obtained his private pilot's license in 1913 from the Aéro-Club of France. At the start of World War I, he served as a pilot in the Swiss military, then as an instruction officer for military aviation. In 1916, he carried out night flights from Delémont to prevent airspace violations; Porrentruy had been bombed by aircraft of unknown origin. Germany and France consented to a Swiss proposal to mount light-beacons along the Swiss-German-French borders to prevent further mistakes.

On 5 November 1919, he co-founded an airline providing aerial photography and passenger flights, Comte, Mittelholzer, and Co. In 1920, this company merged with the financially stronger Ad Astra Aero. Alfred Comte was a frequent participant in exhibition events for acrobatic flying and pioneered the route from Zürich to London. In December 1920, he established a school of aviation of his own using flying boats; six Austrian Lohner TL-1917/R aircraft (CH-61 to CH-65) from a base in Oberrieden on the shores of Lake Zürich. During World War II, Comte returned to military aviation duties and was promoted to captain. From 1946 to 1950, he once again managed a school of aviation in the Limmat Valley, and was also involved in establishing the private airfield Wangen-Lachen on the southern shore of lake Obersee. He finally retired from flying and died in 1965 in Zürich.

== Alfred Comte Schweizerische Flugzeugfabrik ==
Between 1923 and 1935, Alfred Comte concentrated on airplane design and construction in his own company, Alfred Comte Schweizerische Flugzeugfabrik. In all, around 40 aircraft were built, with an additional eight Fokker D.VII under license for the Swiss Air Force. The company had a good reputation, but financially it was not successful, and a fire destroyed some of Comte's designs. The Great Depression hit the small business hard; it could not be saved even by switching to the production of tubular steel furniture, and in 1935 filed for bankruptcy.

From 1923 to 1935, Alfred Comte designed and built several aircraft:

Wild 43
(1923–26), training purpose, 6 built and exported to China and Colombia
Wild X
(1927/28), fighting and observing purpose, 8 built and exported to Colombia
AC-1
(1926), fighter, 1 built, Swiss Air Force preferred in an evaluation to buy Dewoitine D.27
AC-2
2-seat sport biplane with a 60 hp engine, not built
AC-3
(1929/30), transport and bombing purpose, 1 built
AC-4 Gentleman
(1928–30), two-seat sport/training aircraft, 11 built, used by Swiss Air Force and others
AC-5
6-seater with a 200 hp Wright engine, not built
AC-6
2-seat biplane with a 200 hp Wright Whirlwind engine for training or a 400 hp Gnome-Rhône Jupiter for military use, not built
AC-7
2-seat high-wing trainer with a 500 hp Gnome-Rhône Jupiter engine, not built
AC-8
(1929/30), passenger aircraft, 3 built, probably one (or AC-4) used by Ad Astra Aero
AC-9
tri-motor airliner, not built
AC-10
development of the AC-1 with a 480 hp Gnome-Rhone Jupiter engine, not built
AC-11-V
(1931), liaison and survey aircraft, 1 built, rejected by Swiss Air Force
AC-12 Moskito
(1931/35?), airliner, 8 built

== Personal life ==
Comte was married to Erika Zeller, a language instructor, with whom he had three children:

- Ellen Comte, married to Eric Boxall, with issue
- Lottie Comte, married to Nuri Yüksel, with issue
- Alfred Heinrich Comte (1926-2022), married to Sylvia Maria Boetschi (1928-2015); one son, Michel Comte (born 1954), who became a prominent photographer.

He died 1 November 1965 in Zürich, Switzerland aged 70. He was buried in Witikon.

== Literature ==
- Roland Eichenberger: Die Flugzeuge von Alfred Comte, Liebefeld 1968.
- Roland Eichenberger. Alfred Comte (1895–1965), in: Schweizer Pioniere der Wirtschaft und Technik, Vol. 46. Glarus Verlag, Zürich 1987.
