= Comte AC-11-V =

Swiss monoplane

AC-11-V

General information
- Type: Air photography/mapping cabin monoplane
- National origin: Switzerland
- Manufacturer: Comte

History
- First flight: 1930s

The Comte AC-11-V was a 1930s Swiss three-seat cabin monoplane produced by Flugzeugbau A. Comte for aerial photography and mapping. The AC-11-V was a high-wing monoplane with a taikskid-conventional landing gear and powered by a 220 hp (164 kW) Armstrong Siddeley Lynx radial engine.

== Design and development ==
The enclosed cabin had side-by-side seating for a pilot and co-pilot (or mapping photography specialist). To allow easy access to the cabin the starboard seat folded to one side. Another moveable seat was mounted on rails running the whole length of the cabin; it could be locked in any position on the rails giving access to the side windows. A window was fitted between the pilots' seats to allow drift readings to be made and a further floor window aft allowed a vertical camera to be used.

== Operational history ==
During the Second World War years one aircraft was used by the Swiss Air Force to make detailed maps of Switzerland.

== Specifications ==
Data from The Illustrated Encyclopedia of Aircraft

General characteristics

- Crew: 2
- Length: 8.40 m (27 ft 7 in)
- Wingspan: 14.60 m (47 ft 11 in)
- Height: 2.90 m (9 ft 6 in)
- Wing area: 24.40 m^{2} (262.6 sq ft)
- Empty weight: 900 kg (1,984 lb)
- Max takeoff weight: 1,420 kg (3,131 lb)
- Powerplant: 1 × Armstrong Siddeley Lynx radial piston, 160 kW (220 hp)

Performance

- Maximum speed: 190 km/h (120 mph, 100 kn) at 4000m
- Service ceiling: 7,000 m (23,000 ft)
