= Comte AC-12 Moskito =

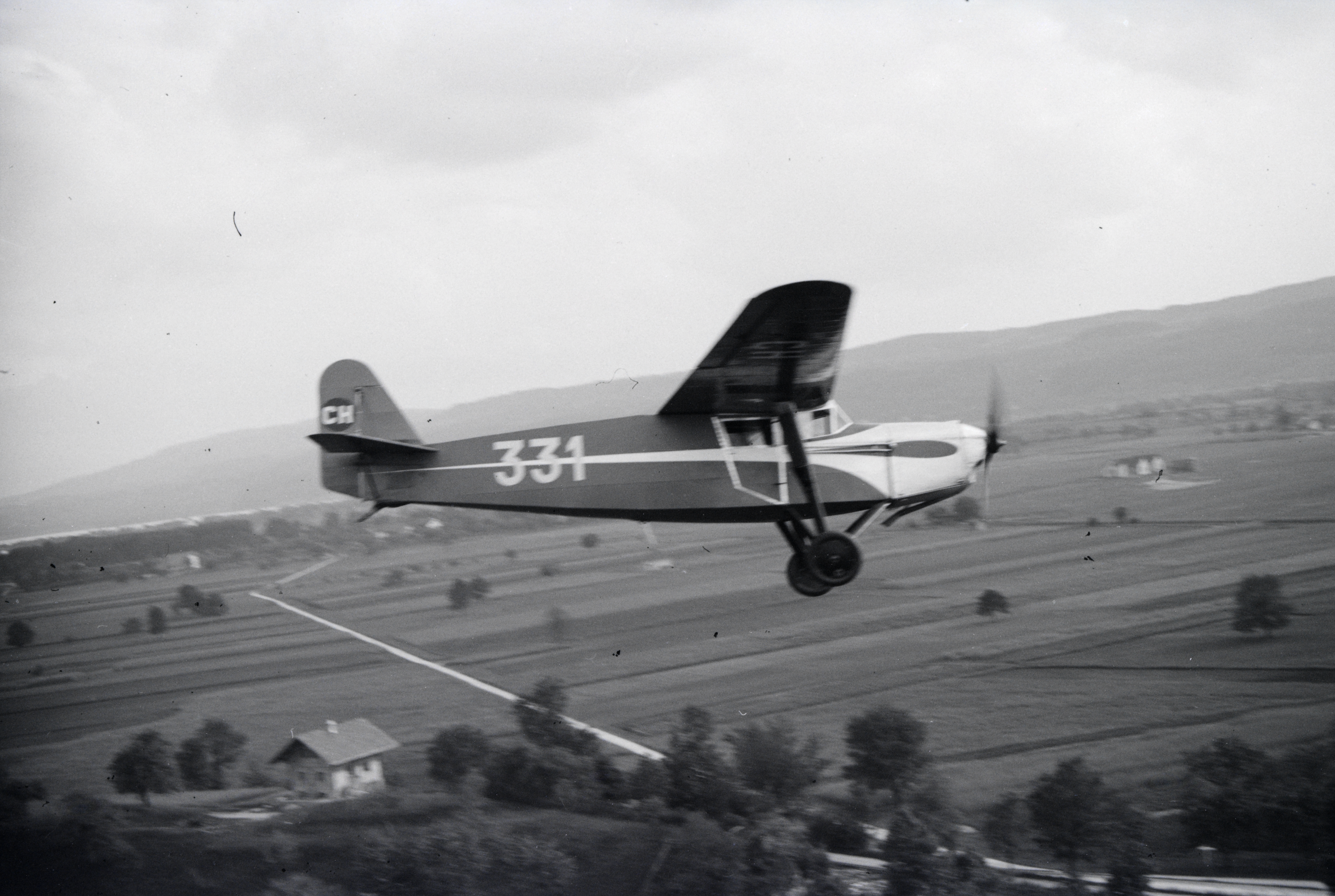
- AC-12 in flight.

General information
- Type: Light touring monoplane
- National origin: Switzerland
- Manufacturer: Comte

The Comte AC-12 Moskito was a 1930s Swiss three-seat light touring cabin monoplane produced by Flugzeugbau A. Comte.

== Design ==
The AC-12 was a high-wing cantilever monoplane with a fixed tailwheel landing gear. The enclosed cabin had a single seat forward for the pilot and a bench seat behind for two passengers. It was available fitted with a number of engines including the 95 hp (71 kW) Argus As 8 and 120 hp (89 kW) de Havilland Gipsy III inline engines or a 140 hp (104 kW) Armstrong Siddeley Lynx radial.

== Specifications (with Argus engine) ==
Data from The Illustrated Encyclopedia of Aircraft

General characteristics

- Crew: 1
- Capacity: 2 passengers
- Length: 7.5 m (24 ft 7.25 in)
- Wingspan: 11.60 m (38 ft 0.75 in)
- Height: 2.25 m (7 ft 4.5 in)
- Wing area: 15.80 m^{2} (170.08 sq ft)
- Empty weight: 500 kg (1,102 lb)
- Gross weight: 800 kg (1,764 lb)
- Powerplant: 1 × Argus As 8 inline piston engine , 71 kW (95 hp)

Performance

- Maximum speed: 180 km/h (112 mph, 97 kn)
- Cruise speed: 155 km/h (96 mph, 83 kn)
- Service ceiling: 5,000 m (16,405 ft)
