= Comte AC-8 =

Six-seat light transport aircraft

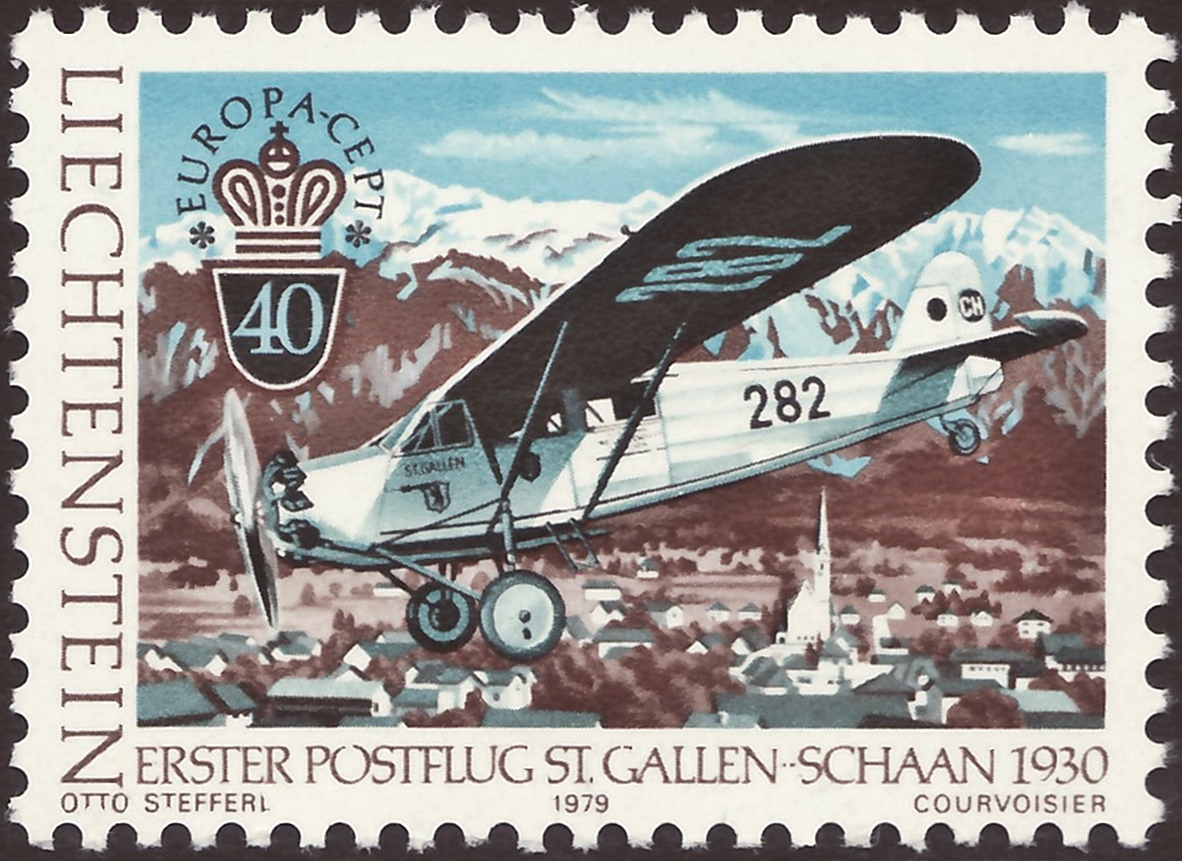

General information
- Type: Light transport
- Manufacturer: Comte
- Primary user: Balair
- Number built: 3

The Comte AC-8 was a 1930s Swiss six-seat light transport aircraft produced by Flugzeugbau A. Comte.

== Design and development ==
Similar in configuration to the company's earlier Comte AC-4, the Comte AC-8 was designed as a light transport for five passengers. It incorporated a braced high-wing monoplane wing, with a conventional tail unit and fixed tailwheel landing gear. The enclosed cabin had accommodation for a pilot and five passengers. The aircraft was powered by either a Wright J-6 or Lorraine radial engine.

Only three aircraft were built.

== Specifications ==
General characteristics

- Crew: 1
- Capacity: 5
- Length: 9.2 m (30 ft 2.25 in)
- Wingspan: 14.5 m (47 ft 6.75 in)
- Height: 2.9 m (9 ft 6 in)
- Wing area: 28 m^{2} (301.4 sq ft)
- Empty weight: 1,115 kg (2,458 lb)
- Gross weight: 1,750 kg (3,858 lb)
- Powerplant: 1 × Wright J-6 radial piston engine , 224 kW (300 hp)

Performance

- Maximum speed: 214 km/h (133 mph, 116 kn)
- Range: 900 km (559 mi, 486 nmi)
- Service ceiling: 5,000 m (16,405 ft)
