= List of cities in Benin =

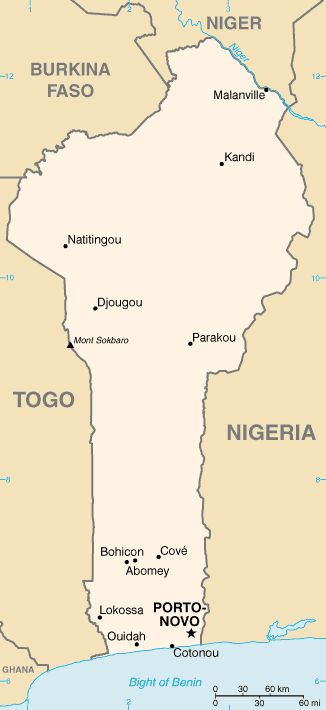
Map of Benin

The following is a list of cities in Benin according to the 2013 census:

== List ==
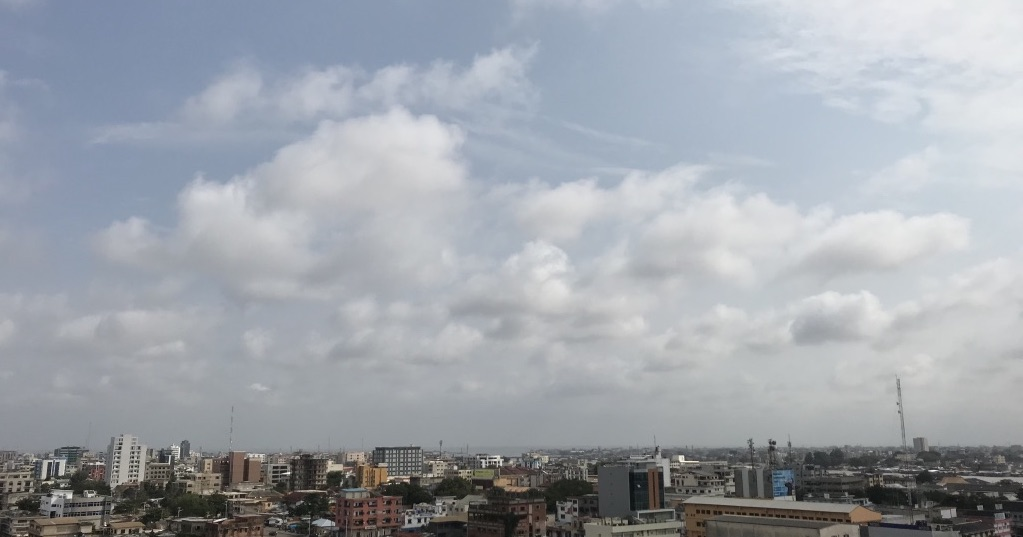
Cotonou, largest city in Benin

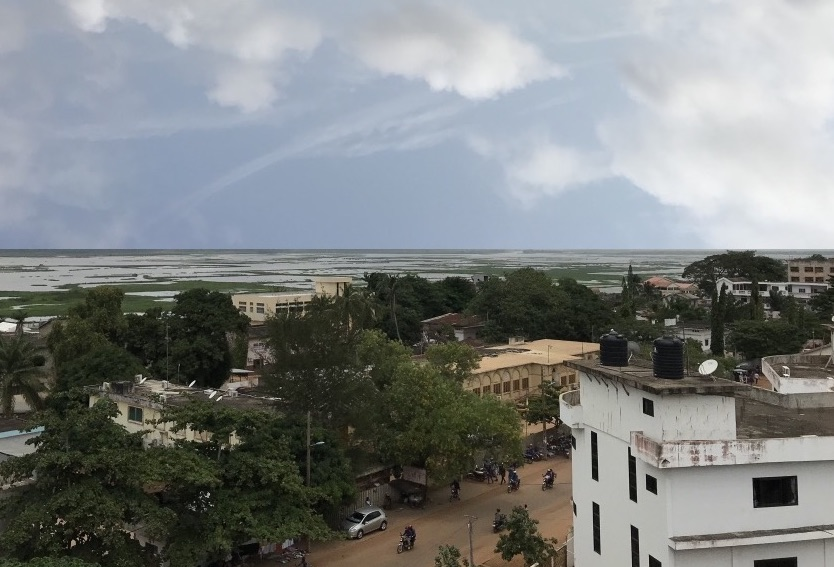
Porto-Novo, capital and second largest city of Benin

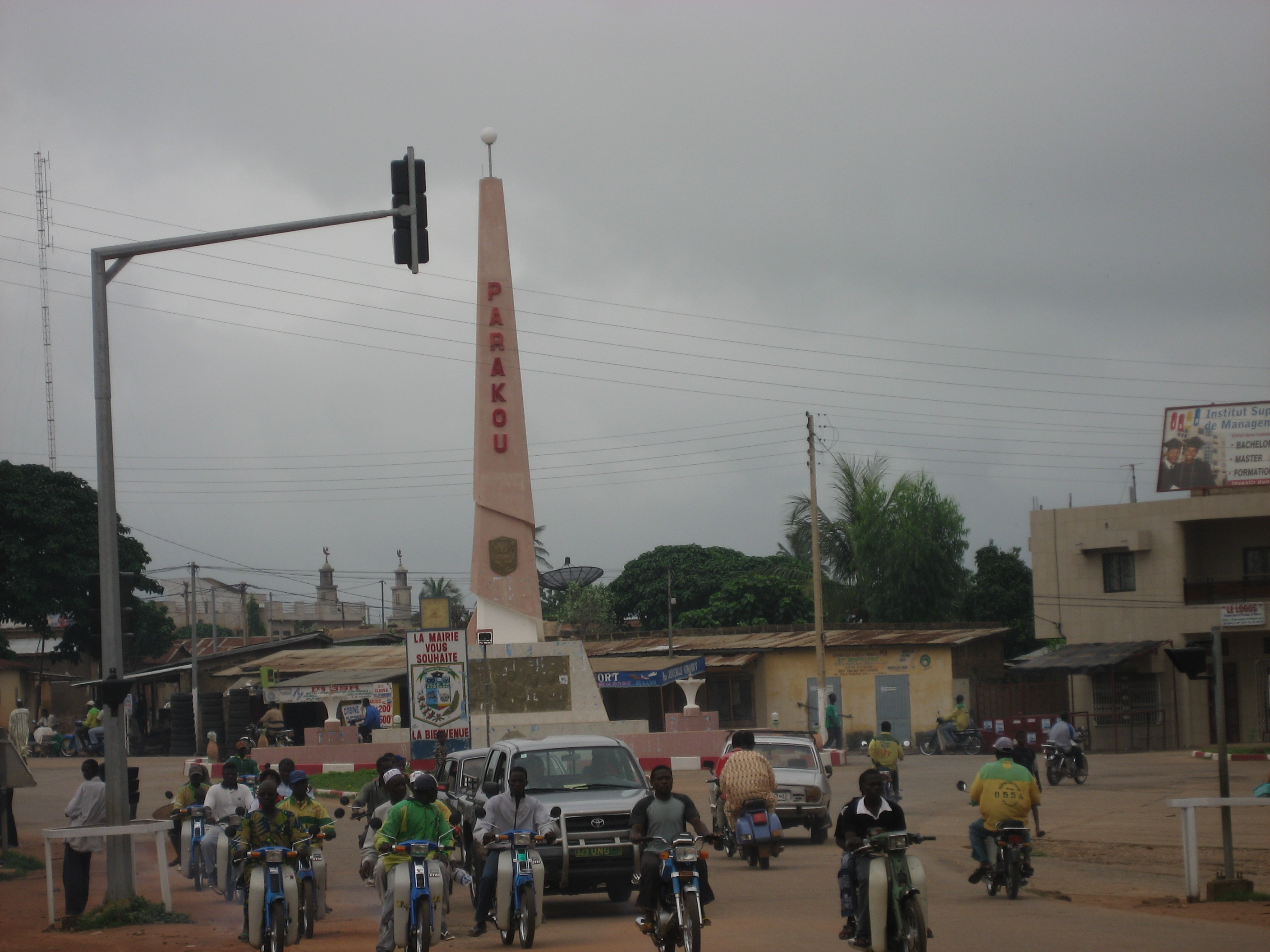
Parakou

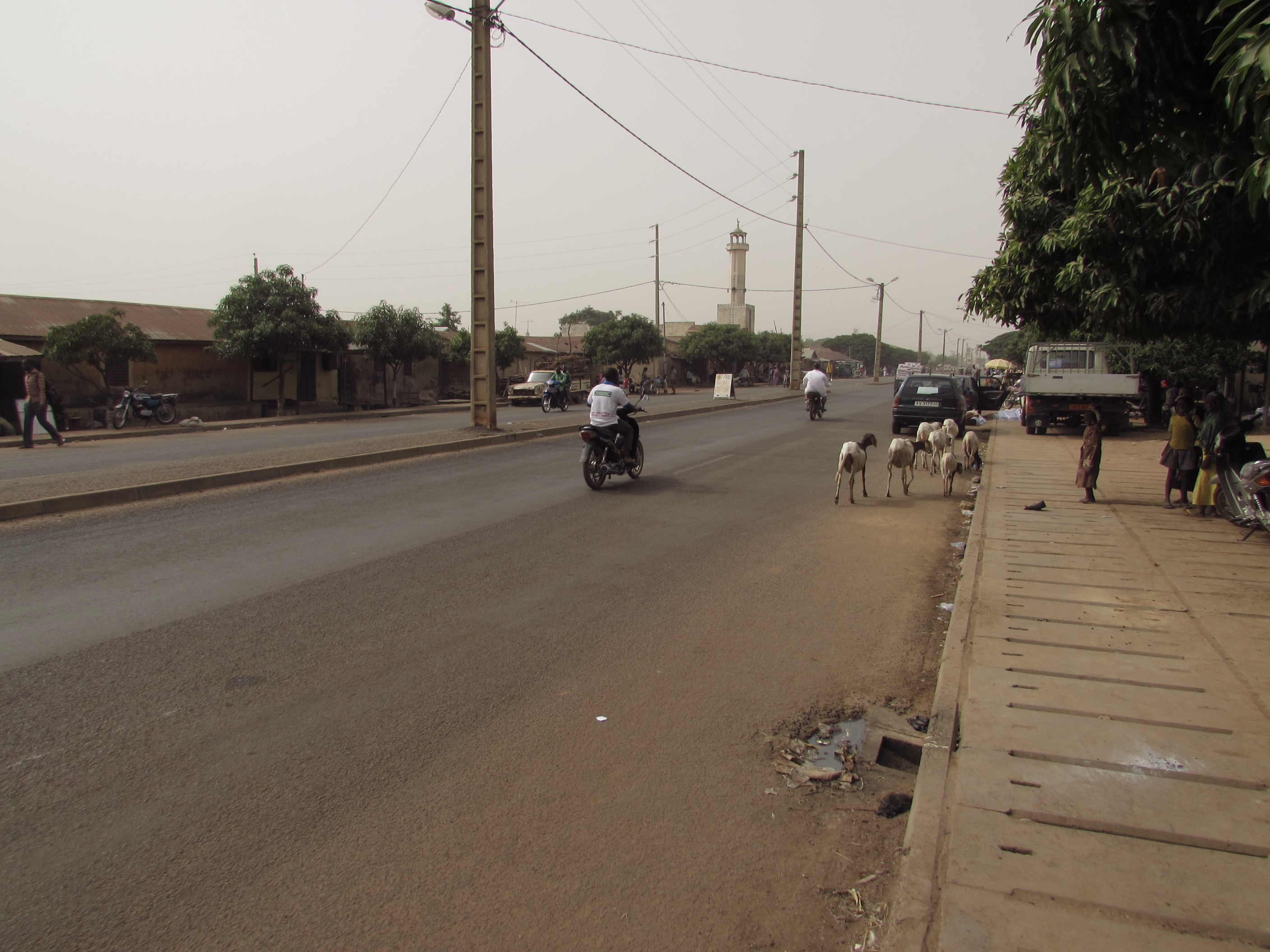
Djougou

=== Largest cities ===
1. Cotonou – 679,012
2. Porto-Novo – 264,320
3. Parakou – 255,478
4. Abomey – 117,824
5. Djougou – 94,773
6. Bohicon – 93,744
7. Kandi – 56,043
8. Natitingou – 53,284
9. Ouidah – 47,616
10. Lokossa – 47,247

=== Alphabetical list ===
- Abomey
- Abomey-Calavi
- Adja-Ouere
- Adjarra
- Adjohoun
- Agbangnizoun
- Agoua
- Aguegues
- Ahomey-Lokpo
- Ahouannonzoun
- Akassato
- Aklankpa
- Akpassi
- Akpro-Misserete
- Allada
- Angaradebou
- Aplahoue
- Athiémè
- Attogon
- Avakpa
- Avame
- Avlekete
- Avrankou
- Ayou
- Banikoara
- Bante
- Bassila
- Basso
- Bembèrèkè
- Bensekou
- Beroubouay
- Bétérou
- Birni
- Biro
- Bohicon
- Bopa
- Bori
- Bouanri
- Bouka
- Boukoumbé
- Brignamaro
- Cobly
- Comè
- Copargo
- Cotonou
- Cové
- Dangbo
- Dassa-Zoumé
- Derassi
- Djakotomey
- Djidja
- Djigbe
- Djougou
- Dodji-Bata
- Dogbo-Tota
- Don
- Donwari
- Firou
- Fo-Boure
- Founougo
- Gakpe
- Garou
- Glazoue
- Godomey
- Gogounou
- Gomia
- Gomparou
- Gouka
- Goumori
- Gounarou
- Grand-Popo
- Guénè
- Guilmaro
- Guinagourou
- Houéyogbé
- Ifangni
- Ina
- Kalale
- Kandi
- Karimama
- Kassakou
- Kassakpéré
- Kérou
- Kétou
- Klouekanme
- Koabagou
- Kokiborou
- Koko
- Kokoro
- Kompa
- Kossoucoingou
- Kouaba
- Kouandé
- Kouarfa
- Koundokpoe
- Kpanroun
- Kpomasse
- Kpome
- Lalo
- Libante
- Liboussou
- Lokossa
- Lon-Agonmey
- Lougba
- Malanville
- Manta
- Materi
- Monsey
- Natitingou
- Ndali
- Nikki
- Oroukayo
- Ouake
- Ouedo
- Ouénou, N'Dali
- Ouénou, Nikki
- Ouesse
- Ouidah
- Ouinhi
- Pahou
- Paouingnan
- Parakou
- Péhonko
- Perere
- Perma
- Pira
- Pobè
- Porga
- Porto-Novo
- Sakété
- Sam
- Sanson
- Savalou
- Savé
- Sè
- Ségbana
- Segbohoue
- Seme-Kpodji
- Setto
- Sinende
- Sikki
- Sirarou
- Sô-Ava
- Soclogbo
- Sonsonré
- Sontou
- Sori
- Soumarou
- Suya
- Tanguiéta
- Tapoga
- Tchaourou
- Toffo
- Togbota
- Tokpa-Avagoudo
- Tori-Bossito
- Tori-Gare
- Toucountouna
- Toura
- Toviklin
- Za-Kpota
- Zangnanado
- Zè
- Zinvie
- Zogbodomey
