= Ouédo =

- Arrondissement and town
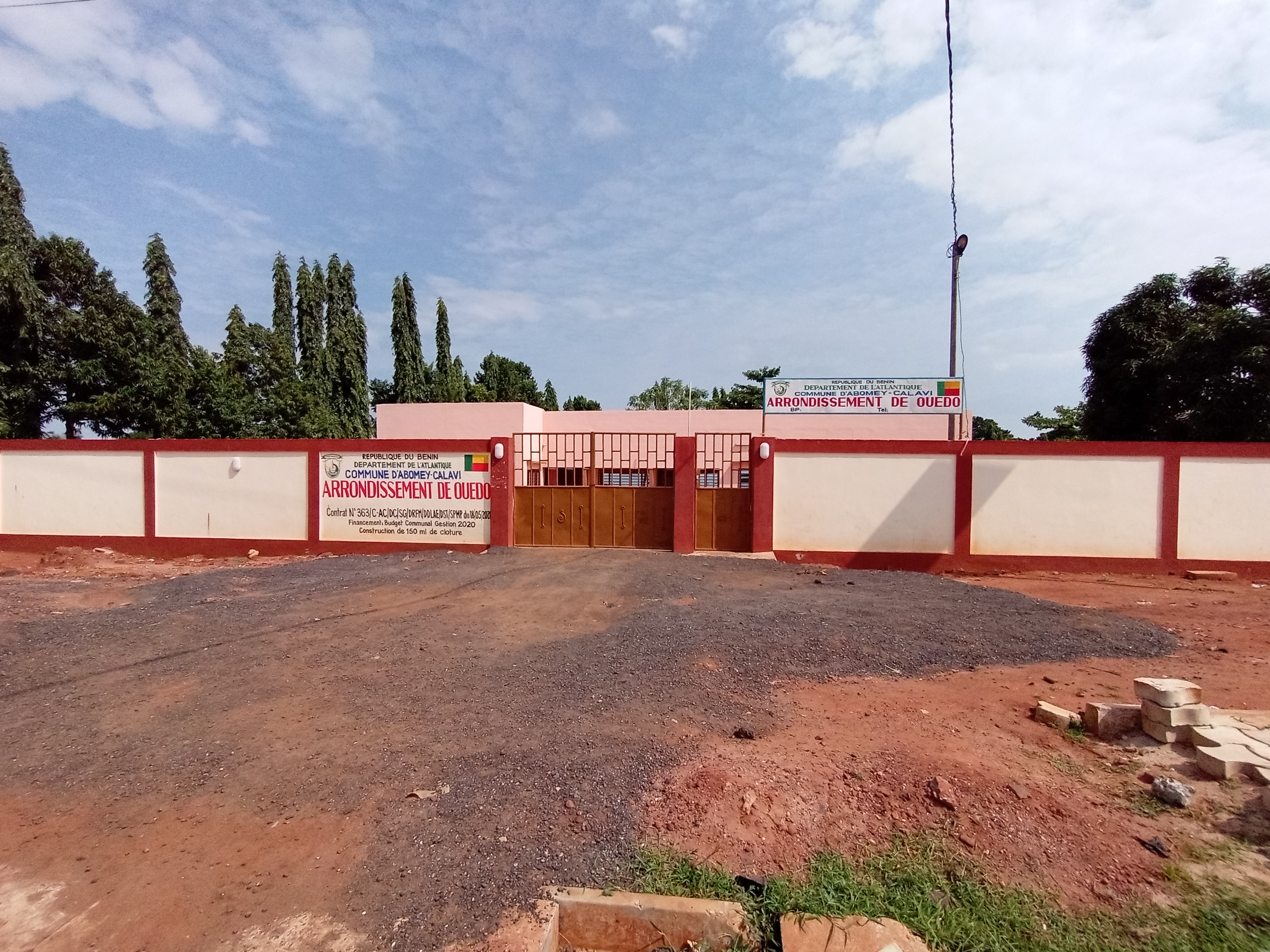
- Ouèdo District Office

- Location in Benin
- Coordinates: 6°29′N 2°27′E
- Country: Benin
- Department: Atlantique Department
- Commune: Abomey-Calavi

Population (2002)
  - Total: 10,067
- Time zone: UTC+1 (WAT)

Ouédo is a town and arrondissement in the Atlantique Department of southern Benin. It is an administrative division under the jurisdiction of the commune of Abomey-Calavi. According to the population census conducted by the Institut National de la Statistique Benin on February 15, 2002, the arrondissement had a total population of 10,067.
