= Ahomey-Lokpo =

Coordinates: 6.4963°N 2.4268°E

- Arrondissement and town
- Interactive map of Ahomey-Lokpo
- Country: Benin
- Department: Atlantique Department
- Commune: Sô-Ava

Population (2002)
  - Total: 8,760
- Time zone: UTC+1 (WAT)

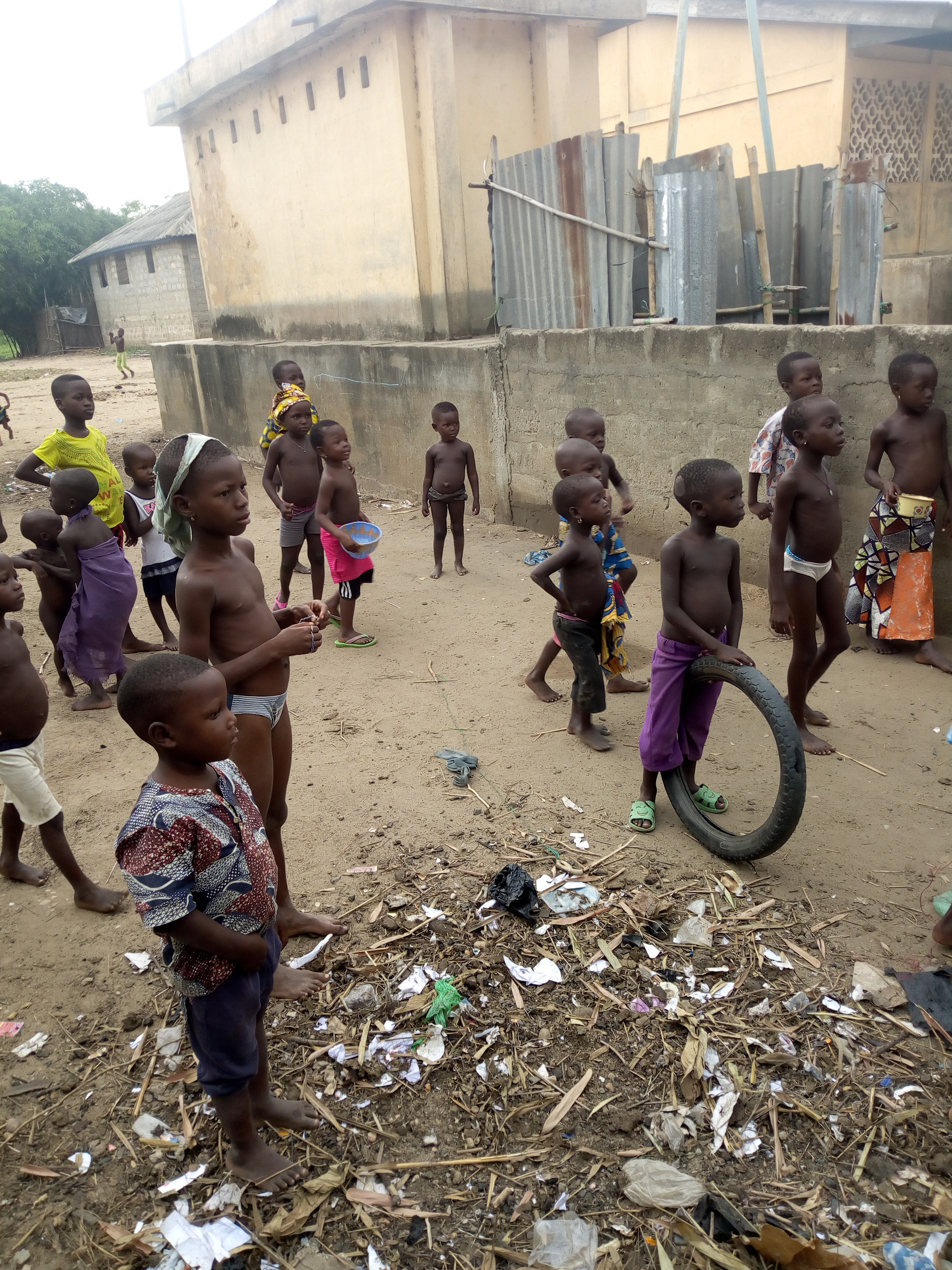
Children in the village of Ahomey Lokpo

Ahomey-Lokpo is a town and arrondissement in the Atlantique Department of southern Benin. It is an administrative division under the jurisdiction of the commune of Sô-Ava. According to the population census conducted by the Institut National de la Statistique Benin on February 15, 2002, the arrondissement had a total population of 8,760.
