= Kpanroun =

Coordinates: 6°30′33″N 2°19′40″E

- Arrondissement and town
- Interactive map of Kpanroun
- Country: Benin
- Department: Atlantique Department
- Commune: Abomey-Calavi

Population (2002)
  - Total: 7,421
- Time zone: UTC+1 (WAT)

Kpanroun is a town and arrondissement in the Atlantique Department of southern Benin. It is an administrative division under the jurisdiction of the commune of Abomey-Calavi. According to the population census conducted by the Institut National de la Statistique Benin on February 15, 2002, the arrondissement had a total population of 7,421.
