= Akassato =

- Arrondissement and town
- Location in Benin
- Coordinates: 6°30′N 2°22′E
- Country: Benin
- Department: Atlantique Department
- Commune: Abomey-Calavi

Population (2002)
  - Total: 17,197
- Time zone: UTC+1 (WAT)

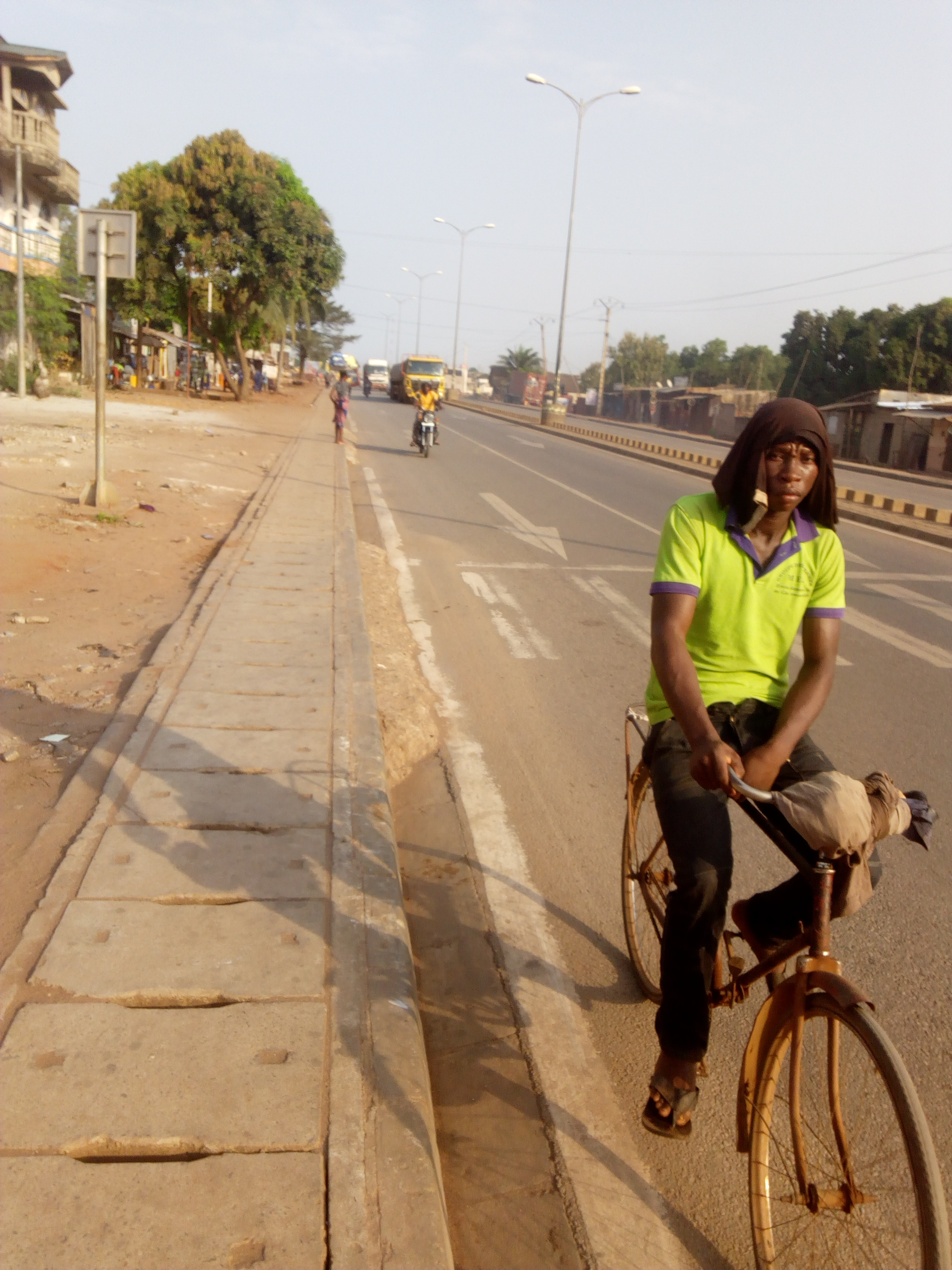
Man cycling on Akassato-Calavi road

Akassato is a town and arrondissement in the Atlantique Department of southern Benin. It is an administrative division under the jurisdiction of the commune of Abomey-Calavi. According to the population census conducted by the Institut National de la Statistique Benin on February 15, 2002, the arrondissement had a total population of 17,197.

Akassato, like many areas of Benin, is home to a constituent monarchy.
