= Don, Benin =

Town in Benin, Africa

Don
- city
- Location in Benin
- Country: Benin
- Department: Zou Department
- Commune: Zogbodomey
- Time zone: UTC+1 (WAT)

Don is a town in Benin, Africa. It is located in the Zogbodomey commune, in the southern part of the Zou Department. The nearest large airports are Cotonou Cadjehoun in Cotonou and Lomé-Tokoin in Lomé, Togo.
