= Brignamaro =

- Arrondissement and town
- Location in Benin
- Coordinates: 10°44′28″N 02°04′23″E
- Country: Benin
- Department: Atakora Department
- Commune: Kérou

Population (2002)
  - Total: 14,751
- Time zone: UTC+1 (WAT)

Brignamaro or Briniamaro is a town and arrondissement in the Atakora Department of northwestern Benin. It is an administrative division under the jurisdiction of the commune of Kérou, located 12 kilometres away from the main town. According to the population census conducted by the Institut National de la Statistique Benin on February 15, 2002, the arrondissement had a total population of 14,751.
