= Bouka =

Bouka may refer to:

- Bouka (film), 1988 film directed by Roger Gnoan M'Bala
- Bouka, Benin, a town and arrondissement in the Borgou Department of Benin
- Bouko, a town and sub-prefecture in Zanzan District, Ivory Coast, that is alternatively spelled "Bouka"
