= Avlékété =

Town in Atlantique Department, Benin

Coordinates: 6°21′N 2°12′E

- Arrondissement and town
- Interactive map of Avlékété
- Country: Benin
- Department: Atlantique Department
- Commune: Ouidah

Population (2002)
  - Total: 5,636
- Time zone: UTC+1 (WAT)

Avlékété is a town and arrondissement in the Atlantique Department of southern Benin. It is an administrative division under the jurisdiction of the commune of Ouidah. According to the population census conducted by the Institut National de la Statistique Benin on February 15, 2002, the arrondissement had a total population of 5636.
