= Lon-Agonmey =

- Arrondissement and town
- Location in Benin
- Coordinates: 06°44′N 02°03′E
- Country: Benin
- Department: Atlantique Department
- Commune: Allada

Population (2002)
  - Total: 3,492
- Time zone: UTC+1 (WAT)

Lon-Agonmey or Long-Agomey is a town and arrondissement in the Atlantique Department of southern Benin. It is an administrative division under the jurisdiction of the commune of Allada. According to the population census conducted by the Institut National de la Statistique Benin on February 15, 2002, the arrondissement had a total population of 3,492.
