= Tokpa-Domè =

Coordinates: 6.4620°N 2.0238°E

- Arrondissement and town
- Interactive map of Tokpa-Domè
- Country: Benin
- Department: Atlantique Department
- Commune: Kpomassè

Population (2002)
  - Total: 8,930
- Time zone: UTC+1 (WAT)

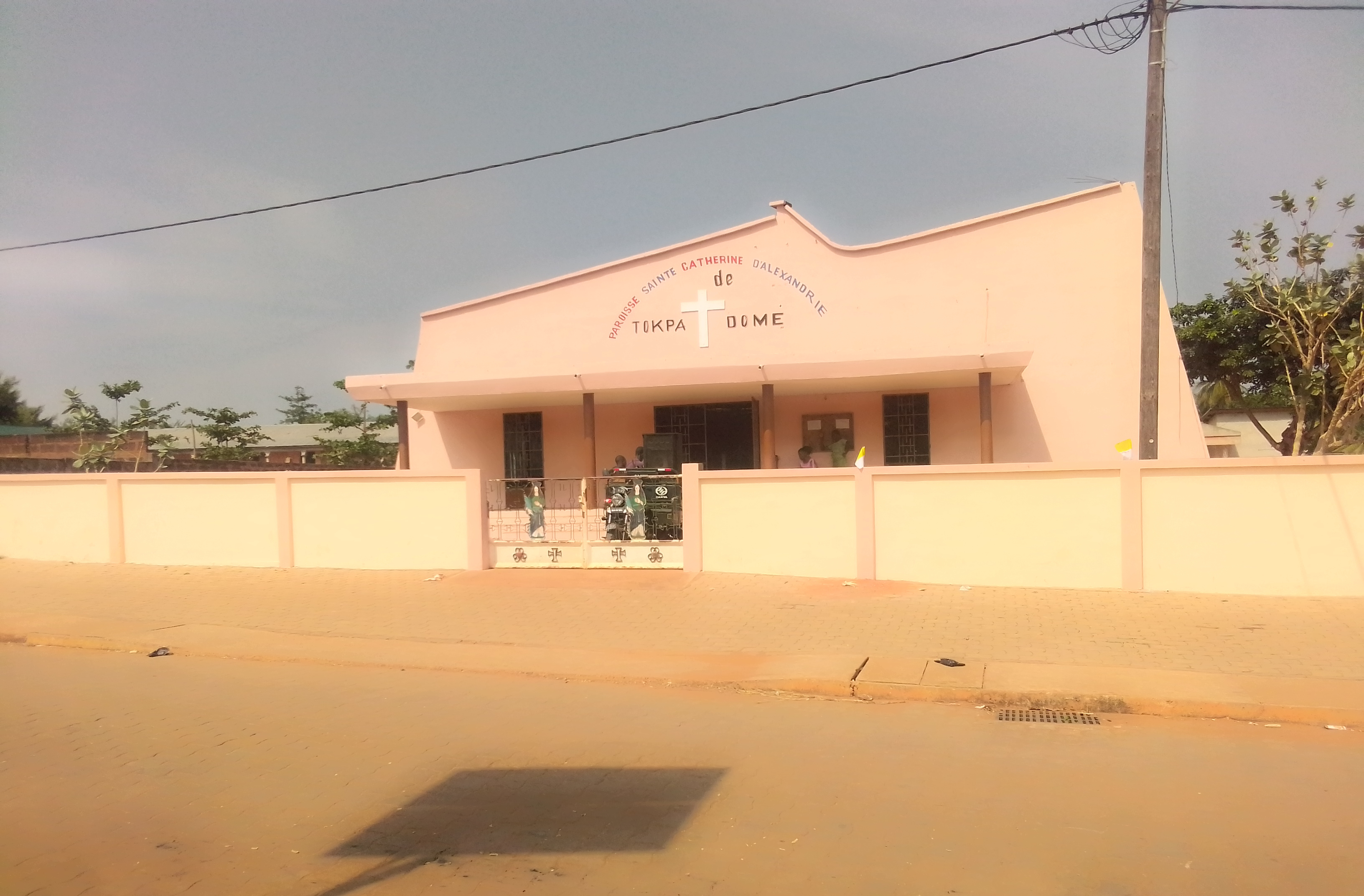
Catholic Church of Tokpa Domey

Tokpa-Domè is a village and arrondissement in the Atlantique Department of southern Benin. It is an administrative division under the jurisdiction of the commune of Kpomassè. According to the population census conducted by the Institut National de la Statistique Benin on February 15, 2002, the arrondissement had a total population of 8,930.
