= Birni =

- Arrondissement and town
- Location in Benin
- Coordinates: 09°59′21″N 01°31′37″E
- Country: Benin
- Department: Atakora Department
- Commune: Kouandé

Population (2002)
  - Total: 12,559
- Time zone: UTC+1 (WAT)

Birni is a town and arrondissement in the Atakora Department of northwestern Benin near the border of Togo. It is an administrative division under the jurisdiction of the commune of Kouandé. According to the population census conducted by the Institut National de la Statistique Benin on February 15, 2002, the arrondissement had a total population of 12,559.

== Environment ==
The town has waterfalls and mountains close to it. Mangoes are plentiful in the area.

== Language ==
The local language is Bariba. 95% speak the local language, and only 5% speak French.

== Infrastructure ==
The town has electricity and wells.

== Community Development ==
From June 2014 to September 2016 the Peace Corps placed a volunteer there to teach English. As of November 2014, the closest Peace Corps house/workstation is in the city of Natitingou, 40 km (24.9 mi) away. There is also a Catholic mission.
