= Bouka, Benin =

Coordinates: 10°13′N 3°08′E

Bouka
- Arrondissement and town
- Interactive map of Bouka
- Country: Benin
- Department: Borgou Department
- Commune: Kalalè

Population (2002)
  - Total: 27,906
- Time zone: UTC+1 (WAT)

Bouka is a town and arrondissement in the Borgou Department of Benin. It is an administrative division under the jurisdiction of the commune of Kalalè. According to the population census conducted by the Institut National de la Statistique Benin on February 15, 2002, the arrondissement had a total population of 27,906.
