= Péhunco =

Péhunco Péhonko
- Commune, arrondissement and town
- Location in Benin
- Coordinates: 10°13′42″N 2°0′7″E
- Country: Benin
- Department: Atakora Department

Area
  - Total: 730 sq mi (1,900 km^{2})

Population (2013)
  - Total: 78,217
- Time zone: UTC+1 (WAT)

Péhunco [pe.œ̃ŋ.ko] or Péhonko [pe.ɔ̃ŋ.ko] is a town, arrondissement and commune located in the Atakora Department of Benin. The commune covers an area of 1,900 kilometres (1,200 mi) and as of 2013 had a population of 78,217 people.
