= Sô-Ava =

Town in the Atlantique Department, Benin

- Commune and city
- Location in Benin
- Coordinates: 6°28′N 2°25′E
- Country: Benin
- Department: Atlantique Department

Area
  - Total: 84 sq mi (218 km^{2})

Population (2002)
  - Total: 76,315
- Time zone: UTC+1 (WAT)

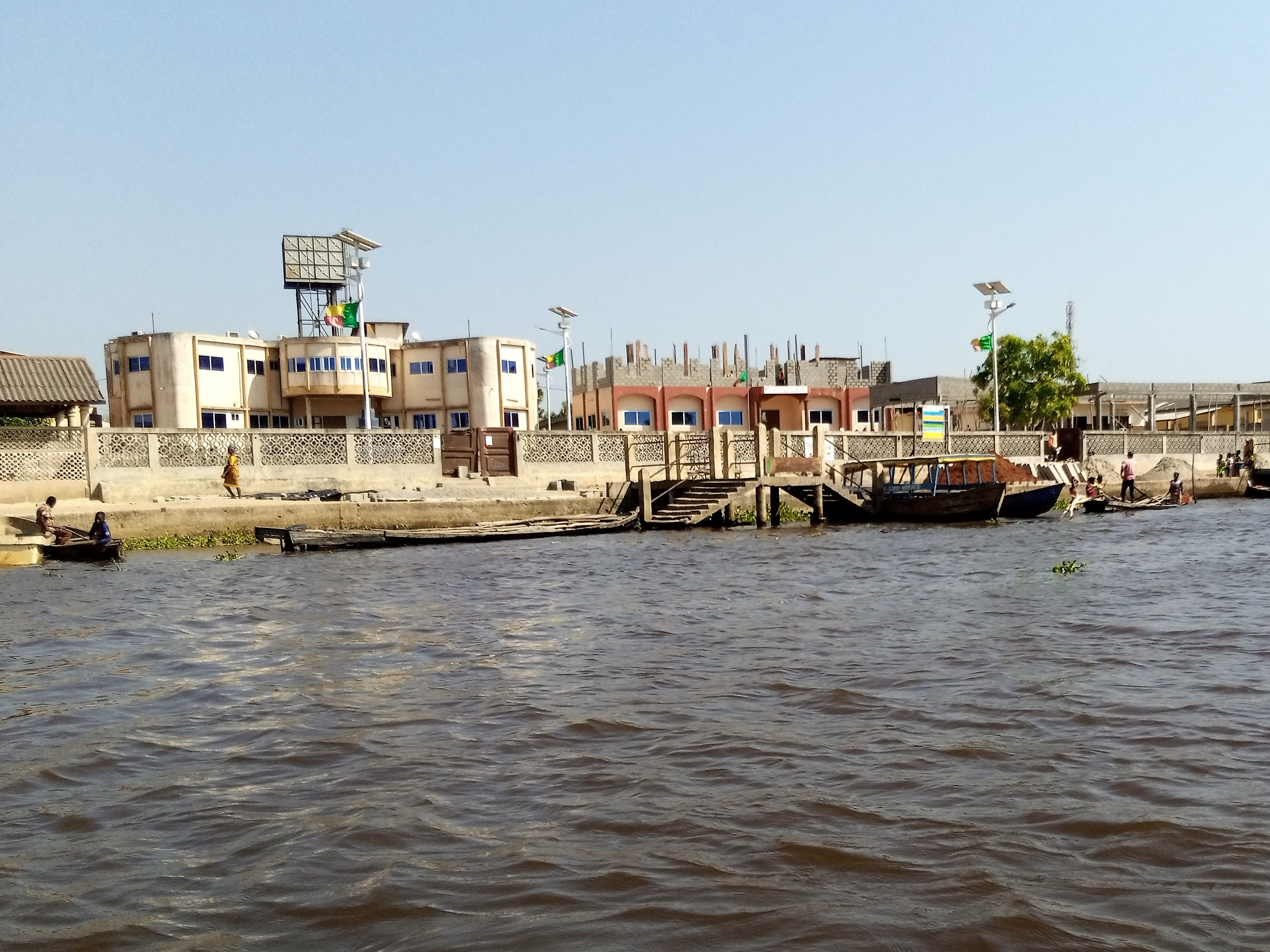
View of the town hall of Sô-Ava from the river.

Sô-Ava [sɔ.a.va] is a town, arrondissement, and commune in the Atlantique Department of southern Benin. The commune covers an area of 218 square kilometres and as of 2002 had a population of 76,315 people.
