= Pèrèrè =

- Commune and city
- Location in Benin
- Coordinates: 9°47′58″N 2°59′34″E
- Country: Benin
- Department: Borgou Department

Area
  - Total: 2,017 km^{2} (779 sq mi)

Population (2013)
  - Total: 78,988
- Time zone: UTC+1 (WAT)

Pèrèrè [pɛ.ʁɛ.ʁɛ] is a town, arrondissement, and commune in the Borgou Department of eastern Benin. The commune covers an area of 2017 square kilometres (1253 square miles) and as of 2013 had a population of 78,988 people.
