= Toffo =

- Commune and city
- Location in Benin
- Coordinates: 6°51′N 2°5′E
- Country: Benin
- Department: Atlantique Department

Area
  - Total: 199 sq mi (515 km^{2})

Population (2002)
  - Total: 74,717
- Time zone: UTC+1 (WAT)

Toffo [tɔ.fo] is a town and commune in the Atlantique Department of southern Benin. The commune covers an area of 515 square kilometres and as of 2002 had a population of 74,717 people.

== Important people ==
- Chantal Djotodia, Nurse and Former First Lady of Central African Republic (2013-2014)
- Bernardin Gantin, cardinal.
