= Sinendé =

- Commune and city
- Location in Benin
- Coordinates: 10°20′41″N 2°22′45″E
- Country: Benin
- Department: Borgou Department

Area
  - Total: 884 sq mi (2,289 km^{2})

Population (2013)
  - Total: 91,672
- Time zone: UTC+1 (WAT)

Sinendé [si.nɑ̃.de] is a town, arrondissement, and commune in the Borgou Department of central Benin. The commune covers an area of 2289 square kilometres and as of 2013 had a population of 91,672 people.
