= Kalalé =

- Commune and city
- Location in Benin
- Coordinates: 10°17′43″N 3°22′54″E
- Country: Benin
- Department: Borgou Department

Area
  - Total: 1,385 sq mi (3,586 km^{2})

Population (2013)
  - Total: 168,882
- Time zone: UTC+1 (WAT)

Kalalè [ka.la.lɛ] is a town, arrondissement, and commune in the Borgou Department of eastern Benin. The commune covers an area of 3,586 square kilometres (1,385 sq mi) and as of 2013 had a population of 168,882 people.
