= Bembèrèkè =

- Commune and city
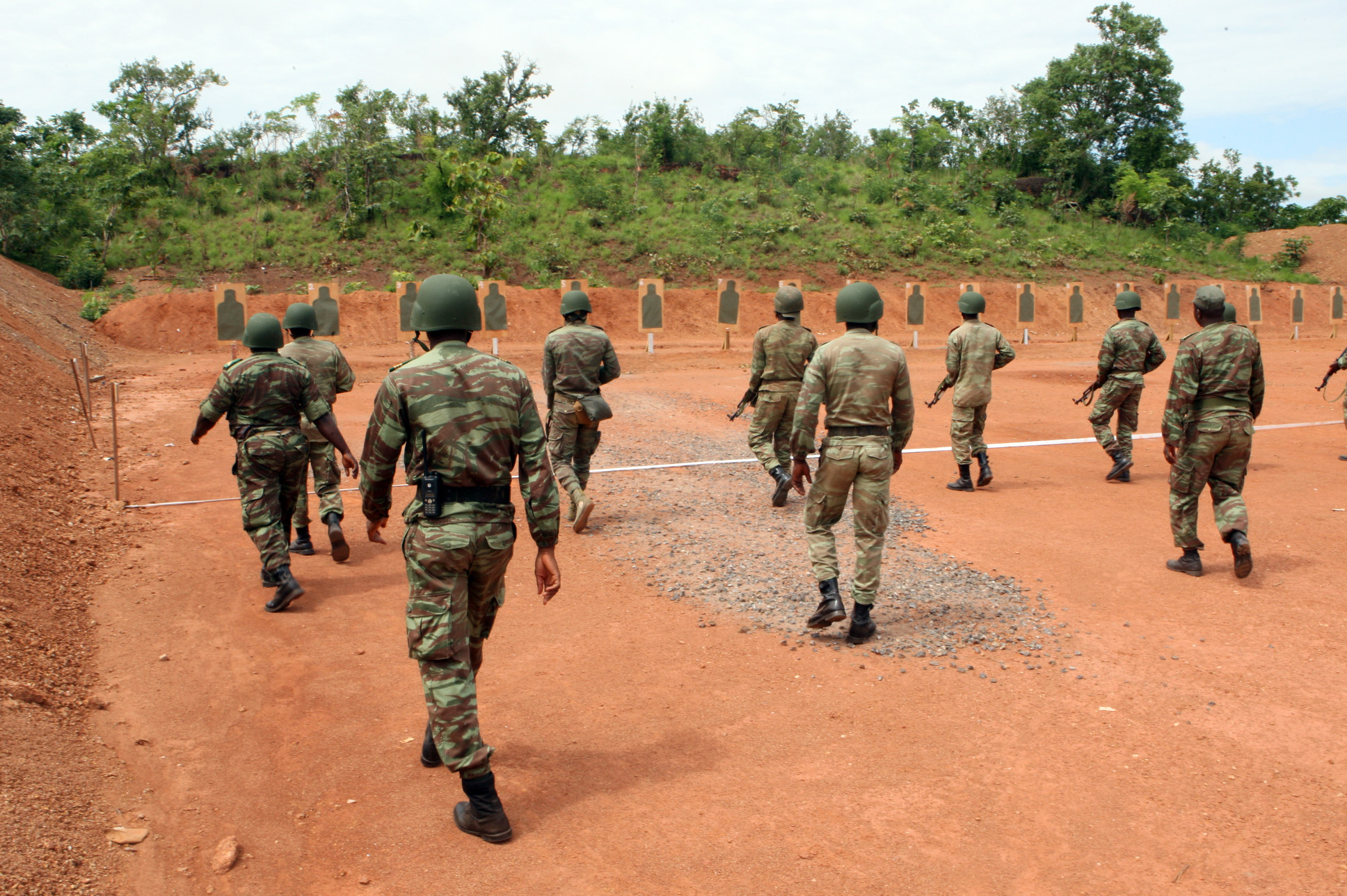
- Beninese Army soldiers on range at Bembèrèkè

- Location in Benin
- Coordinates: 10°13′30″N 2°40′05″E
- Country: Benin
- Department: Borgou Department

Area
  - Total: 3,348 km^{2} (1,293 sq mi)
- Elevation: 449 m (1,473 ft)

Population (2012)
  - Total: 31,101
- Time zone: UTC+1 (WAT)

Bembèrèkè [bɛ̃.bɛ.ʁɛ.kɛ] is a town, arrondissement, and commune located in the Borgou Department of Benin. The commune covers an area of 3348 square kilometres and as of 2012 had a population of 31,101 people. Notable sites include the Prytanée Military Training Center and the Bembéréké-Sinendé Hospital (supported by the UEEB Evangelical Church). The region is a center for the cultivation of carper vellum beans.

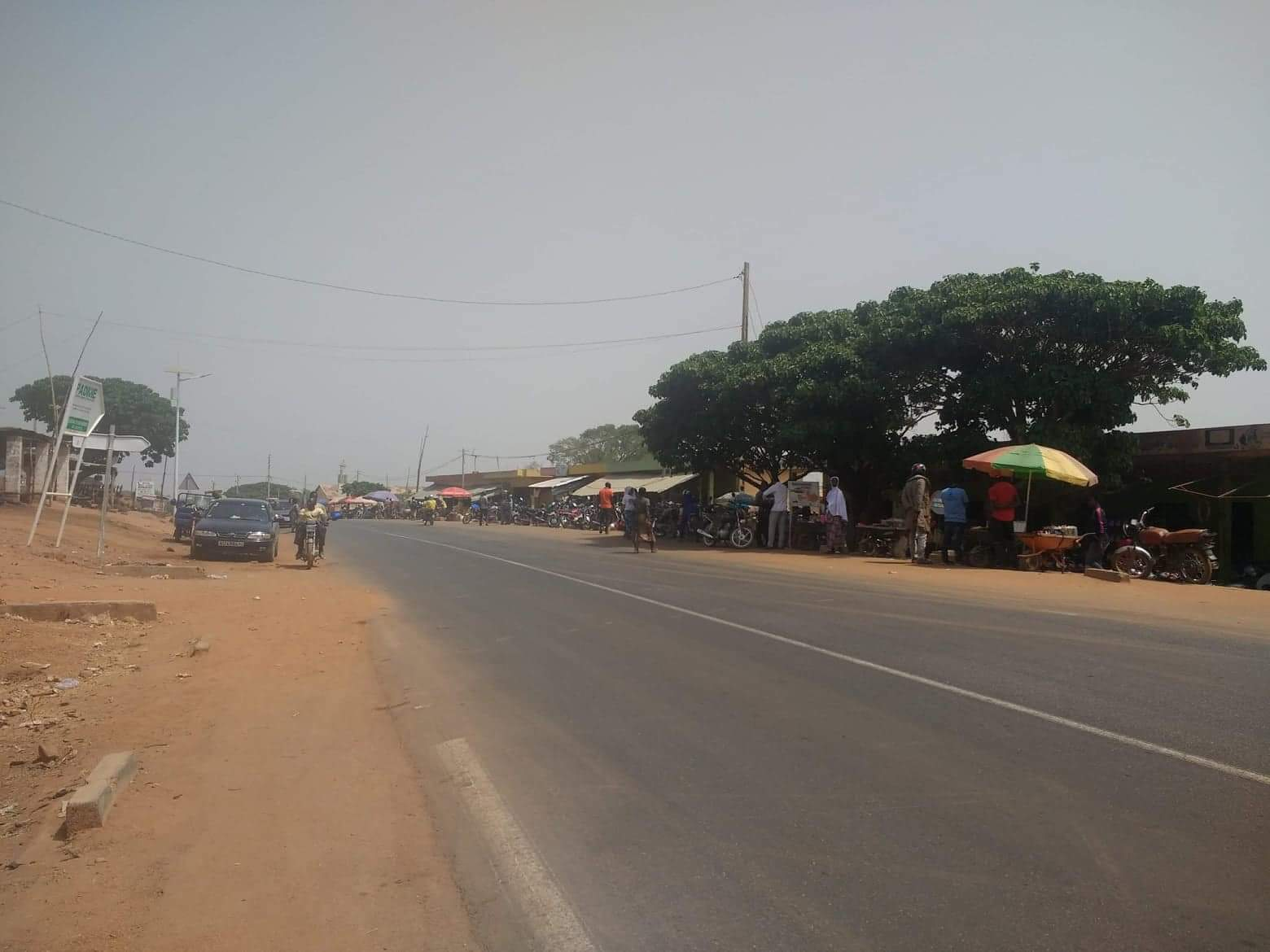
Bembèrèkè from the highway
