= Kouandé =

- Commune, arrondissement and town
- Location in Benin
- Coordinates: 10°19′54″N 1°41′29″E
- Country: Benin
- Department: Atakora Department

Area
  - Total: 4,500 km^{2} (1,700 sq mi)
- Elevation: 436 m (1,430 ft)

Population (2013 census)
  - Total: 112,014
  - Density: 25/km^{2} (64/sq mi)
- Time zone: UTC+1 (WAT)

Kouandé [kwɑ̃.de] is a town, arrondissement and commune, located in the Atakora Department of Benin.The commune covers an area of 4500 square kilometres and as of 2013 had a population of 112,014 people. The main town had an estimated 7,127 people in 2008.

Kouandé, like many areas of Benin, is home to a constituent monarchy. The monarchy, once part of the Borgu federation, has existed since at least the 18th century. The town is also populated by the Bariba people.
