= Kérou =

- Commune, arrondissement and town
- Location in Benin
- Coordinates: 10°49′30″N 2°6′34″E
- Country: Benin
- Department: Atakora Department

Area
  - Total: 3,745 km^{2} (1,446 sq mi)
- Elevation: 310 m (1,020 ft)

Population (2012)
  - Total: 37,419
  - Density: 9.992/km^{2} (25.88/sq mi)
- Time zone: UTC+1 (WAT)

Kérou [ke.ʁu] is a town, arrondissement and commune located in the Atakora Department of Benin.The commune covers an area of 3745 square kilometres and as of 2012 had a population of 37,419 people.
