= Abomey-Calavi =

- Commune and city
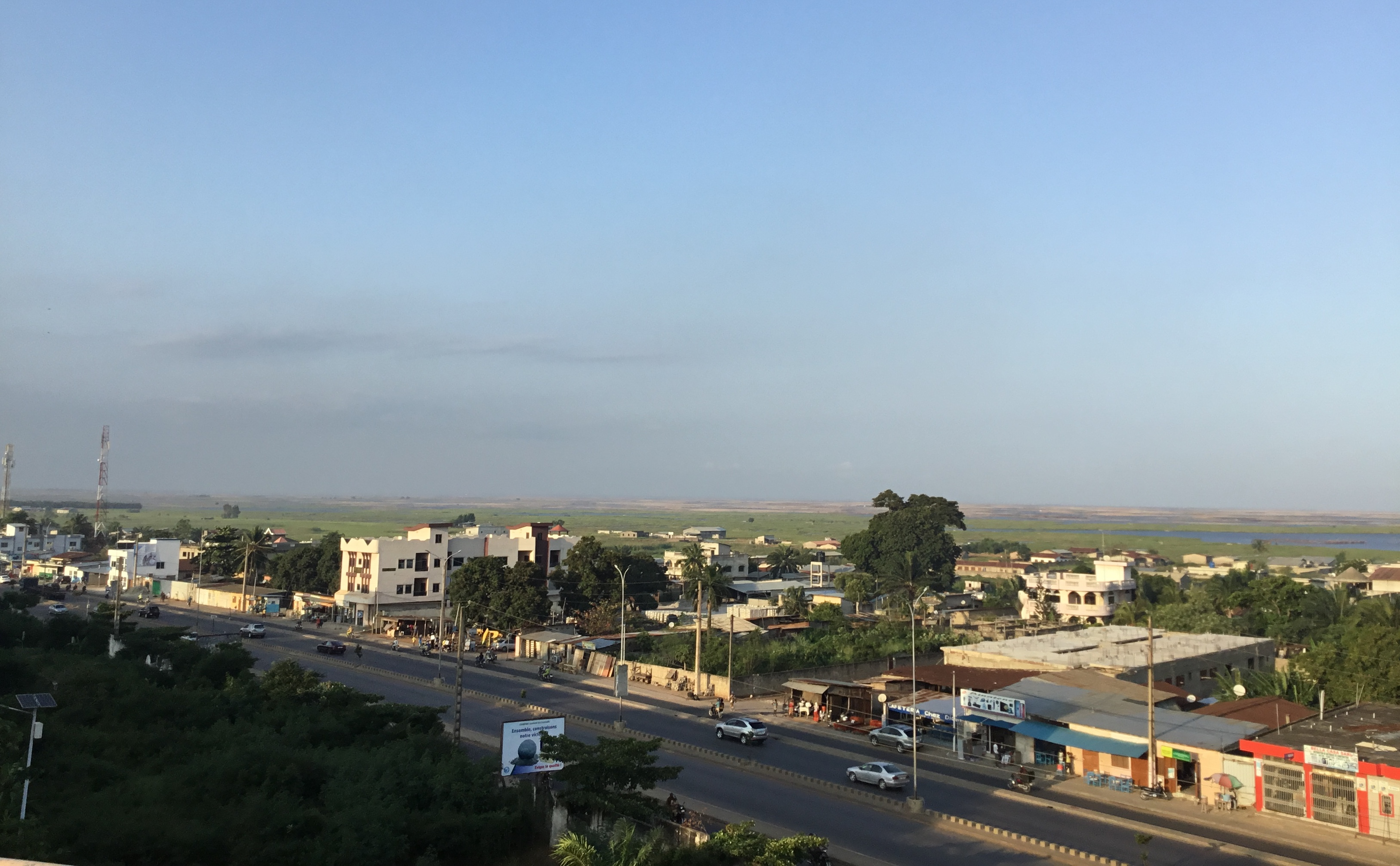
- Abomey-Calavi

- Location within Benin
- Coordinates: 6°26′55″N 2°21′20″E
- Country: Benin
- Department: Atlantique Department

Area
  - Total: 650 km^{2} (250 sq mi)
- Elevation: 54 m (177 ft)

Population (2013 Census)
  - Total: 655,965
  - Density: 1,000/km^{2} (2,600/sq mi)

Abomey-Calavi [a.bɔ.mɛ.ka.la.vi] is a city, arrondissement, and commune located in the Atlantique Department of Benin. It is now essentially a suburb of Cotonou and at its closest it begins approximately 18 km from the city centre of Cotonou. The main cities of the commune are Abomey-Calavi itself and Godomey to the south. The commune covers an area of 650 square kilometres and as at the May 2013 Census had a population of 655,965 people. Projected to be the eleventh fastest growing city on the African continent between 2020 and 2025, with a 5.27% growth.

The city is home to a constituent monarchy.

== History ==
The history of Abomey-Calavi is linked to that of Abomey and the Kingdom of Dahomey Abomey-Calavi was founded to be near Cotonou, in order to facilitate trade.

== Education ==
Its principal university is the University of Abomey-Calavi, founded in 1970.

== Places of worship ==
Among the places of worship, they are predominantly Christian churches and temples : Roman Catholic Archdiocese of Cotonou (Catholic Church), Protestant Methodist Church in Benin (World Methodist Council), Union of Baptist Churches of Benin (Baptist World Alliance), Living Faith Church Worldwide, Redeemed Christian Church of God, Assemblies of God. There are also Muslim mosques.. The town is also a noted centre of Voodoo, and contains a large fetish market.

== Economy ==
The inhabitants of the commune of Abomey-Calavi carry out several activities in different sectors such as agriculture, livestock farming, fishing, trade, crafts, transport, fuelwood exploitation, transformation of products.

== Gallery ==
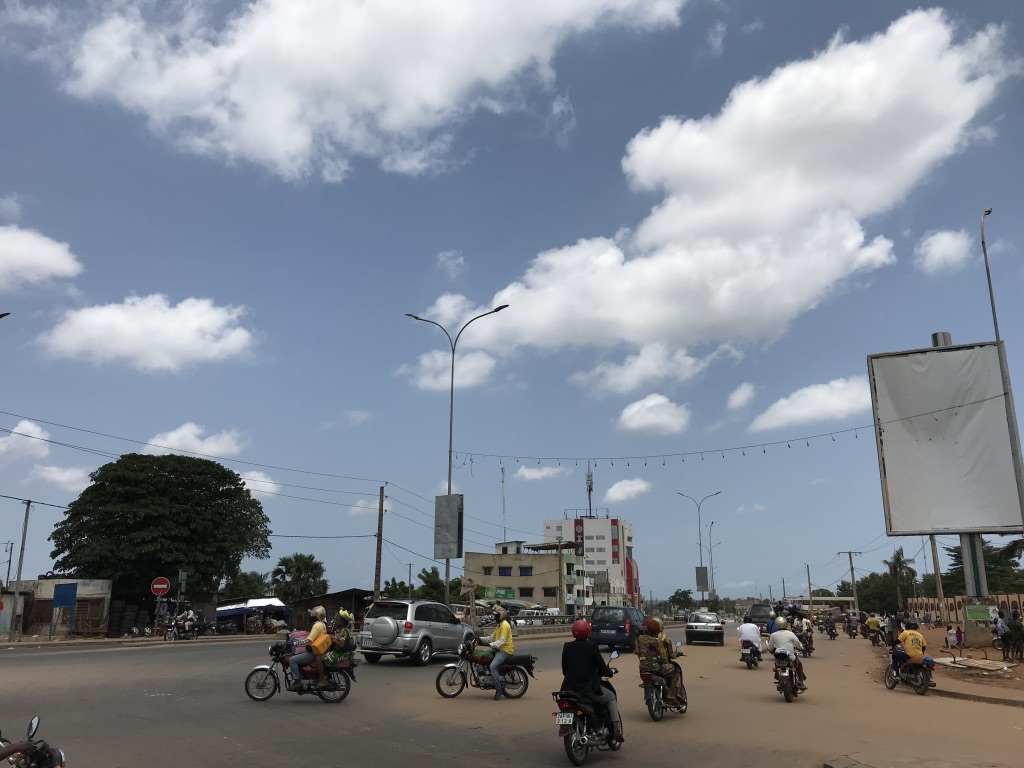
Abomey-Calavi downtown

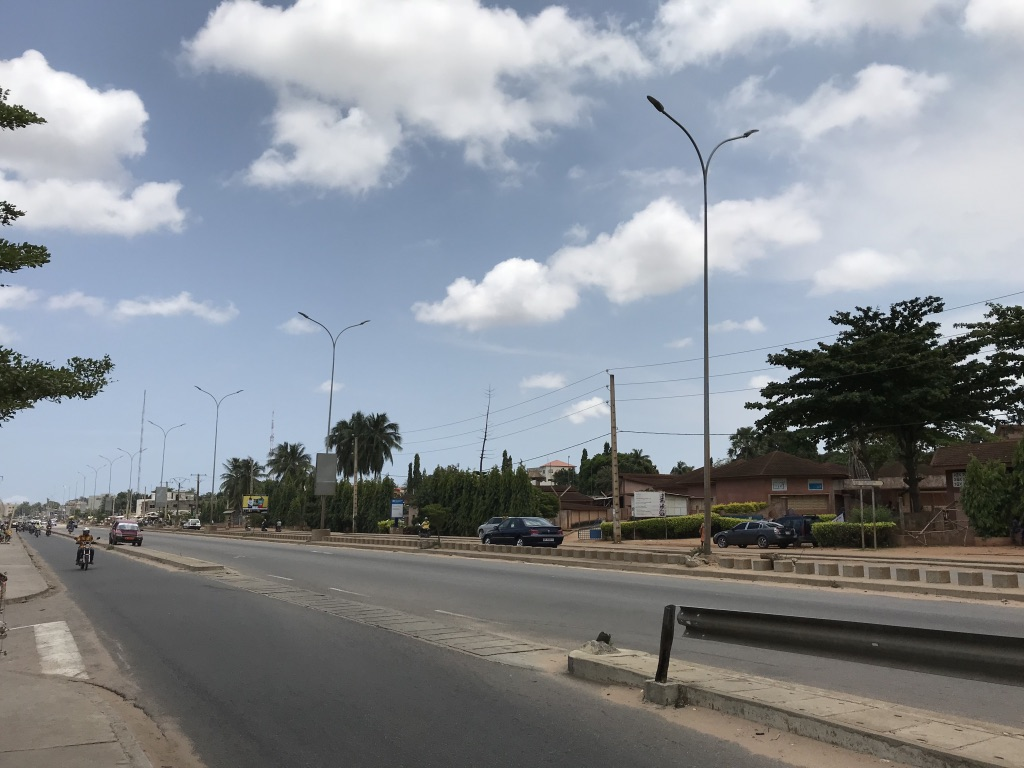
Main road of Abomey-Calavi

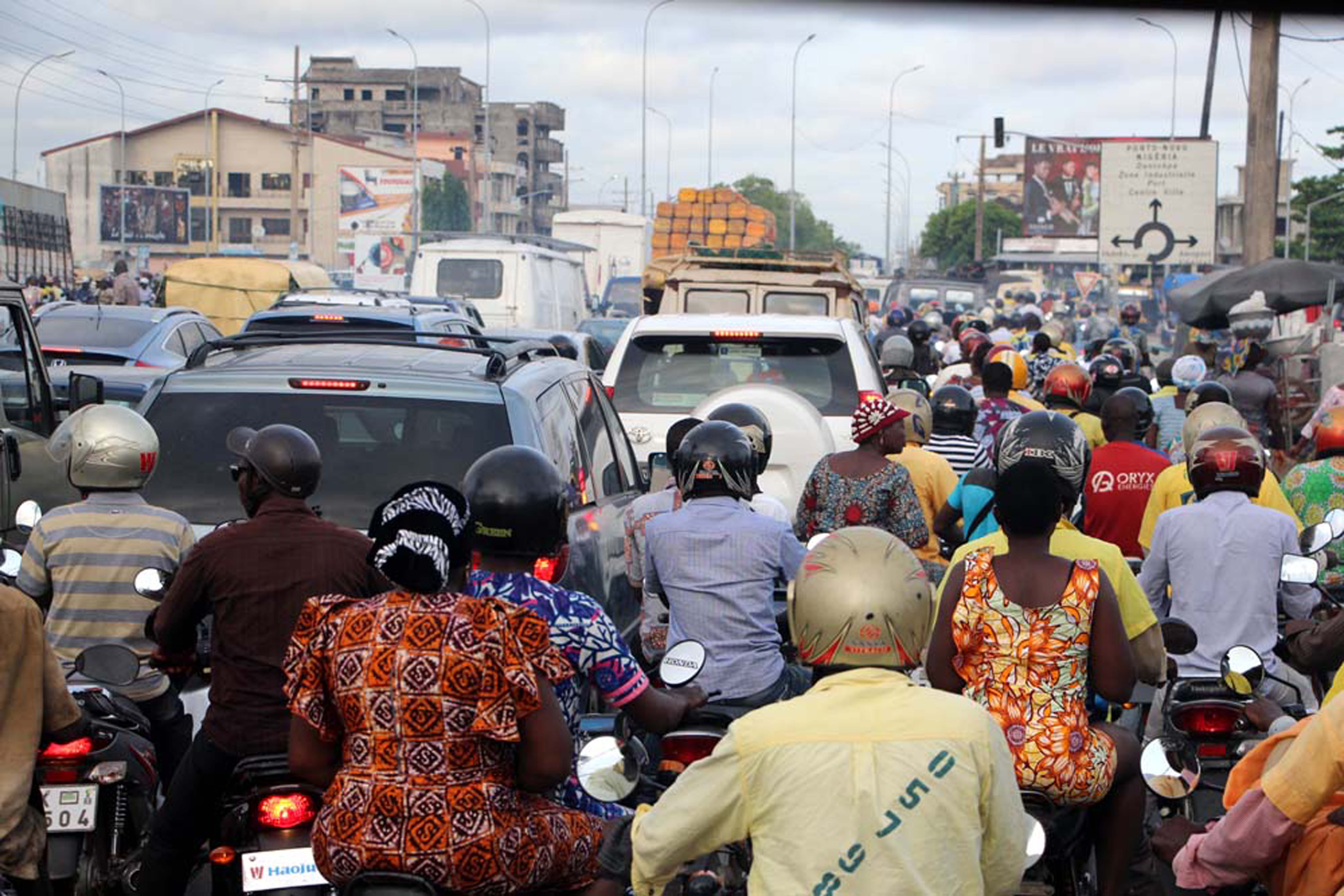
Traffic congestion

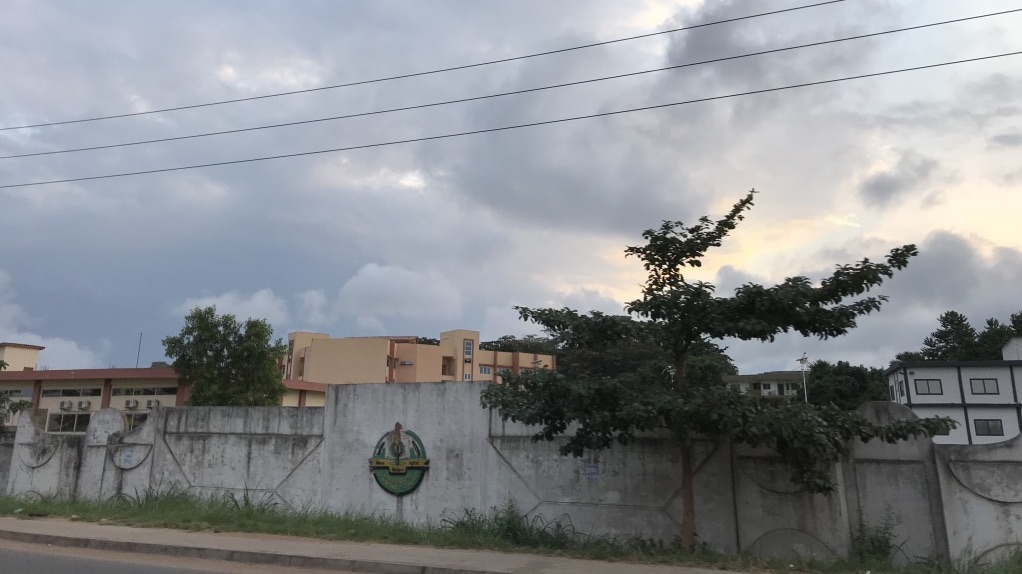
Main campus of University of Abomey-Calavi

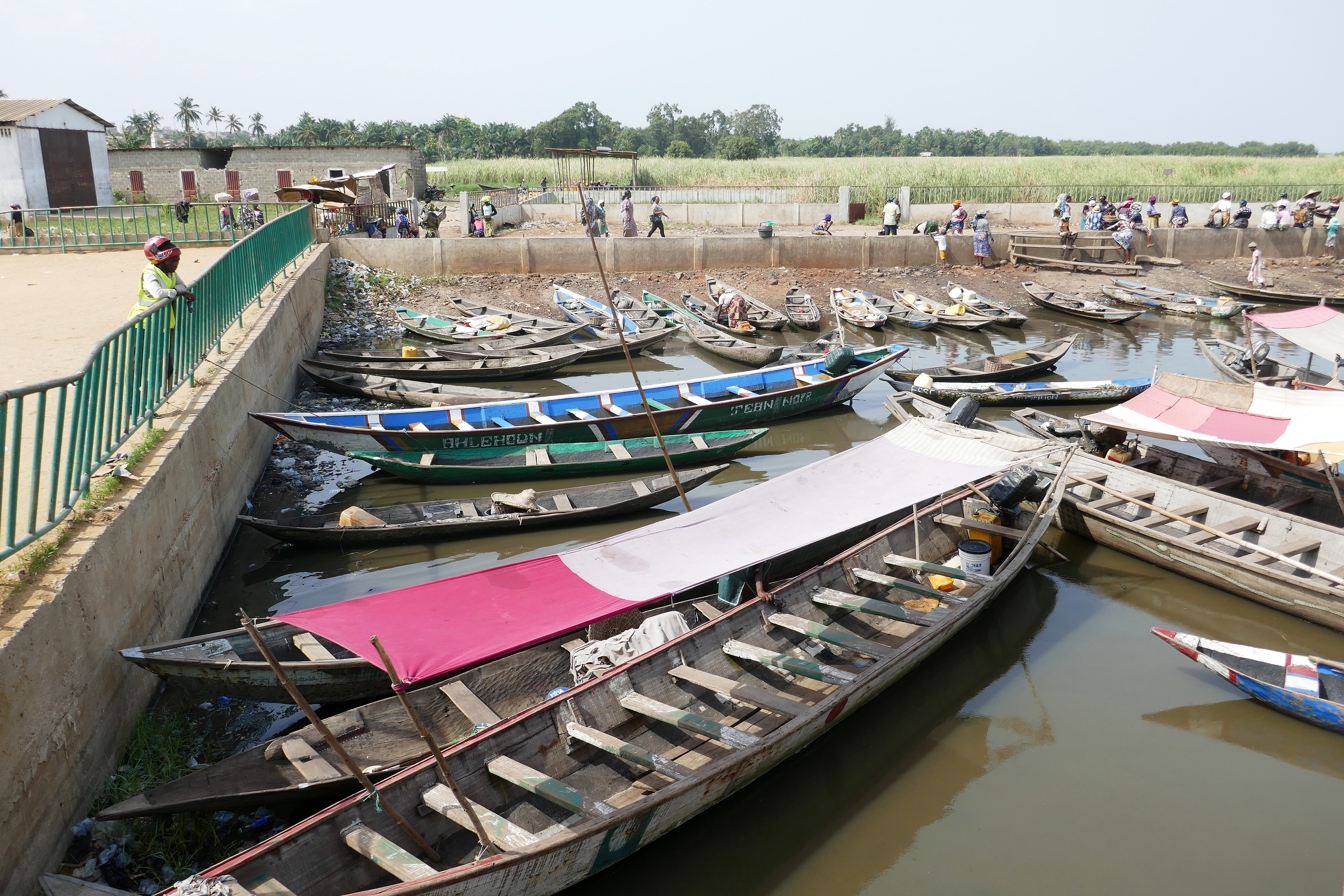
Abomey-Calavi jetty for Ganvie

Abomey-Calavi jetty (video)
