= Zè =

- Commune and city
- Location in Benin
- Coordinates: 6°47′N 2°18′E
- Country: Benin
- Department: Atlantique Department

Area
  - Total: 210 sq mi (543 km^{2})

Population (2013)
  - Total: 106,913
- Time zone: UTC+1 (WAT)

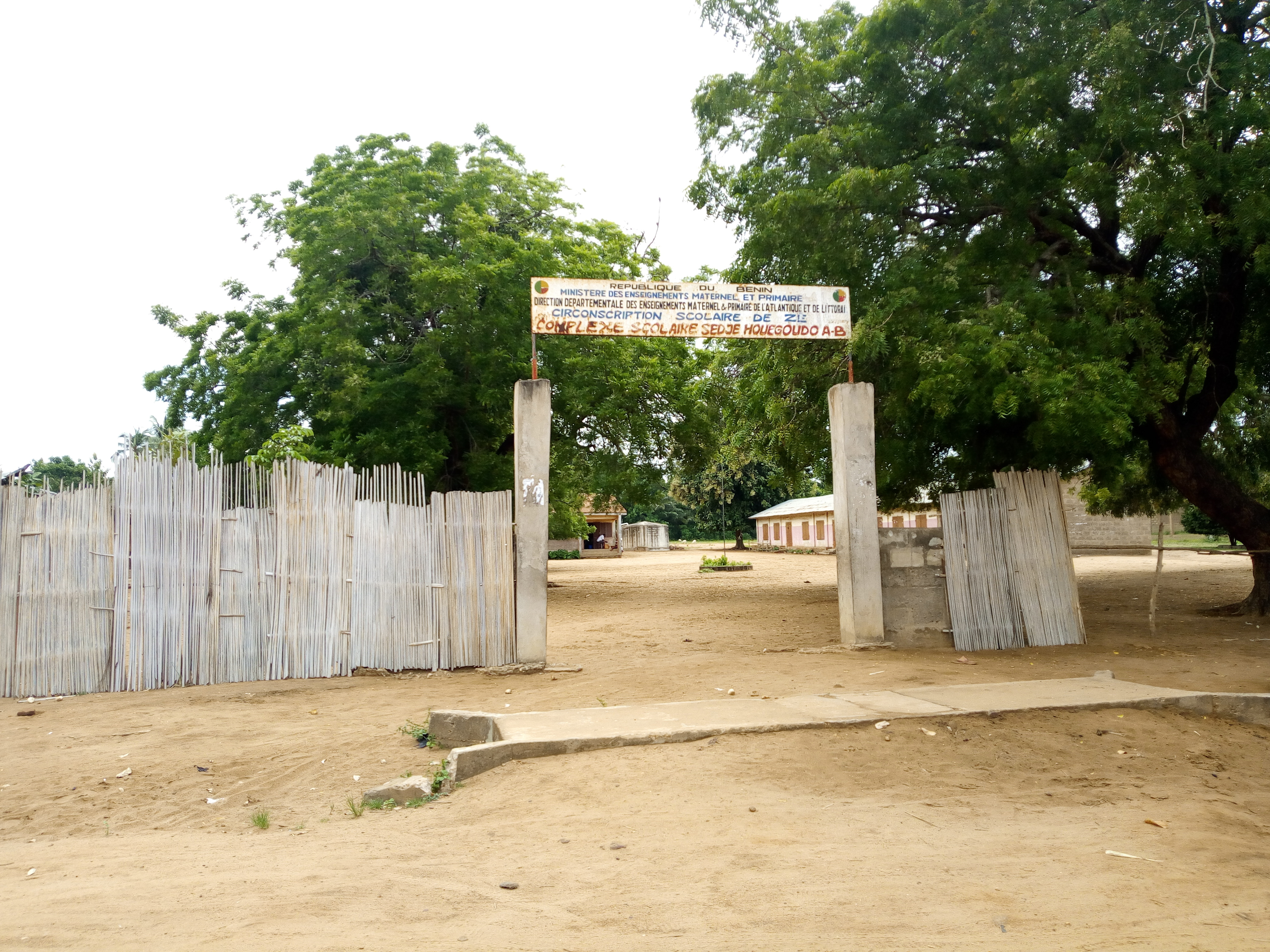
Sedjè Houénougo Primary School in Zè, Benin

Zè [zɛ] is a town, arrondissement, and commune in the Atlantique Department of southern Benin. The commune covers an area of 543 square kilometres and as of 2013 had a population of 106,913 people.
