= Atlantique Department =

Regional department in the country of Benin

Atlantique
- Department
- Map highlighting the Atlantique Department
- Coordinates: 6°40′N 2°15′E
- Country: Benin
- Capital: Ouidah

Area
  - Total: 3,233 km^{2} (1,248 sq mi)

Population (2013 census)
  - Total: 1,396,548
  - Density: 432.0/km^{2} (1,119/sq mi)
- Time zone: UTC+1 (WAT)

Atlantique ([a.tlɑ̃.tik], "Atlantic") is one of the twelve departments in Benin. The department is located in south-central Benin along the Atlantic coast, between Mono and Kouffo Department in the west, Zou in the north, and Ouémé in the east. The department of Atlantique was bifurcated in 1999 when some of its territories was transferred to the newly formed Littoral Department.

As of 2013, the total population of the department was 1,398,229, with 686,747 males and 711,482 females. The proportion of women was 50.90%. The total rural population was 55.50%, while the urban population was 44.50%. The total labour force in the department was 433,515, of which 43.40% were women. The proportion of households with no level of education was 39.20% and the proportion of households with children attending school was 77.30%.

== Geography ==
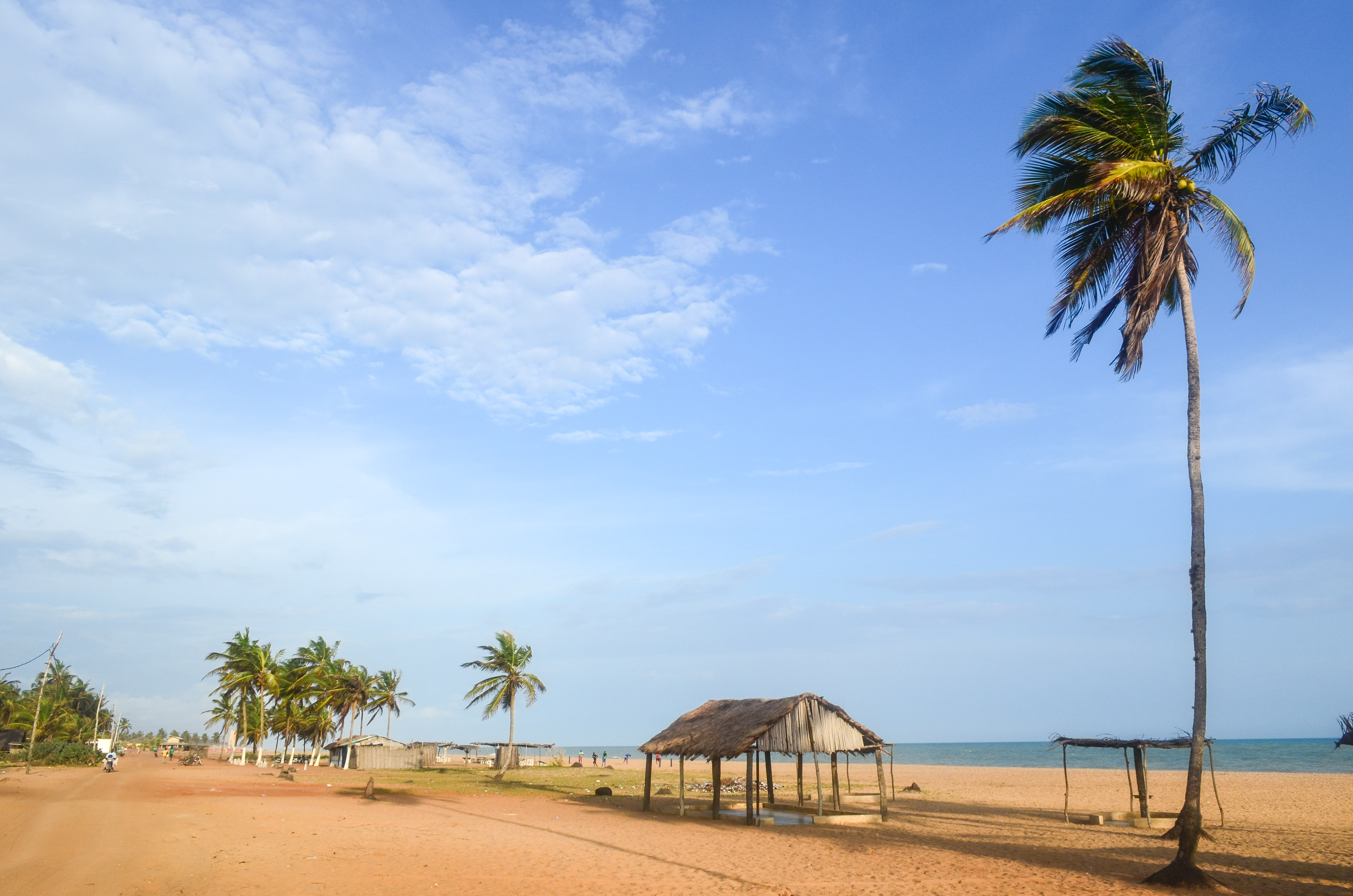
A beach near Ouidah, Benin

Atlantique Department border Zou Department to the north, Ouémé Department to the east, Littoral Department to the south-east, the Atlantic Ocean to the south, and Kouffo Department and Mono Department to the west. The coastal areas have interconnected lakes and lagoons and elongated coastlines with wide marshes; part of Lake Nokoué lies within the department. The southern regions of Benin receive two seasons of rainfall from March to July and September to November, while the northern regions of the country receive one season of rainfall from May to September. The country receives an average annual rainfall of around 1,200 mm (47 in), but Atlantique Department receives less rainfall. The department has mostly low-lying sandy coastal plains towards the Atlantic Ocean, marshes, lagoons and lakes. The highest elevation in the department around the coastal plains is 20 m (66 ft), compared to the country's average of 200 m (660 ft) above mean sea level.

=== Settlements ===
Ouidah is the departmental capital; other major settlements include Abomey-Calavi, Allada, Ganvie, Godomey, Kpomassè, Sô-Ava, Toffo, Togoudo, Tokpa-Domè, Tori-Bossito and Zè.

== Economy ==
Freshwater and seawater fishing is the major profession in the region. Petroleum was discovered in the 1960s in offshore areas, while titanium, low quality iron ore, ilmenite and chromite are the major minerals.

== Demographics ==
Religious census
Religion	Percent(%)
Catholic	39.3%
Other Christian	15%
Vodoun	12.1%
Celestial	11%
Muslim	4.4%
Other Protestant	3.5%
Methodist	3.3%
Other Traditional	0.8%
Other	4.1%

According to Benin's 2013 census, the total population of the department was 1,398,229, with 686,747 males and 711,482 females. The proportion of women was 50.90%.The total rural population was 55.50%, while the urban population was 44.50%. The proportion of women of childbearing age (15 to 49 years old) was 24.80%.The foreign population was 16,517, representing 1.20% of the total population in the department. The labour force participation rate among foreigners aged 15–64 years was 37.30%. The proportion of women among the foreign population constituted 55.30%. The number of households in the department was 298,769 and the average household size was 4.7. The intercensal growth rate of the population was 5.10%.

Among women, the average age at first marriage was 28.7 and the average age at maternity was 29. The synthetic index of the fertility of women was 4.4. The average number of families in a house was 1.2 and the average number of persons per room was 1.8. The total labour force in the department was 433,515, of which 43.40% were women. The proportion of households with no level of education was 39.20% and the proportion of households with children attending school was 77.30%. The crude birth rate was 35.1, the general rate of fertility was 141.50 and the gross reproduction rate was 2.20.

Ethnically, the Fon constitute a majority of the population at 61%, followed by the Yoruba at 10% and the Aja at 7%. Other ethnolinguistic groups in the department include the Ayizo and Tofin.

== Administrative divisions ==
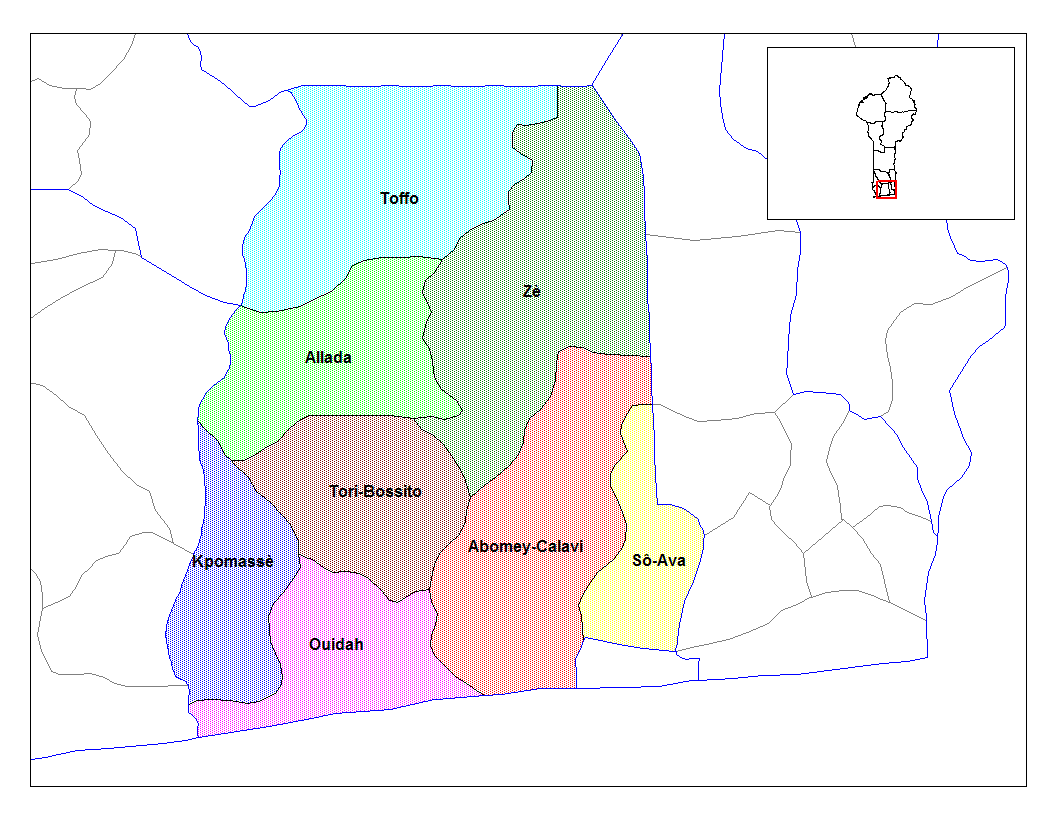
Communes of Atlantique

Atlantique is subdivided into eight communes, each centered at one of the principal towns: Abomey-Calavi, Allada, Kpomassè, Ouidah, Sô-Ava, Toffo, Tori-Bossito and Zè. The department of Atlantique was bifurcated in 1999 when some of the Cotonou and the surrounding area were transferred to the newly formed Littoral Department.

Benin originally had six administrative regions (départements), which have now been bifurcated to make 12. Each of the deconcentrated administrative services (directions départementales) of the sectoral ministries takes care of two administrative regions. A law passed in 1999 transformed the sous-prefectures, the lowest level of territorial administration, into local governments. Municipalities and communal councils have elected representatives who manage the administration of the regions. The latest elections of the municipal and communal councils were held in June 2015.
