= Communes of Benin =

Communes of Benin

The departments of Benin are subdivided into 77 communes, which in turn are divided into arrondissements and finally into villages or city districts. Prior to 1999 provinces were broken down into 84 districts, titled either urban or rural. Before independence, the six provinces were subdivided into cercles, cantons, préfectures and villages or towns.

The communes are listed below, by department:

== Alibori ==
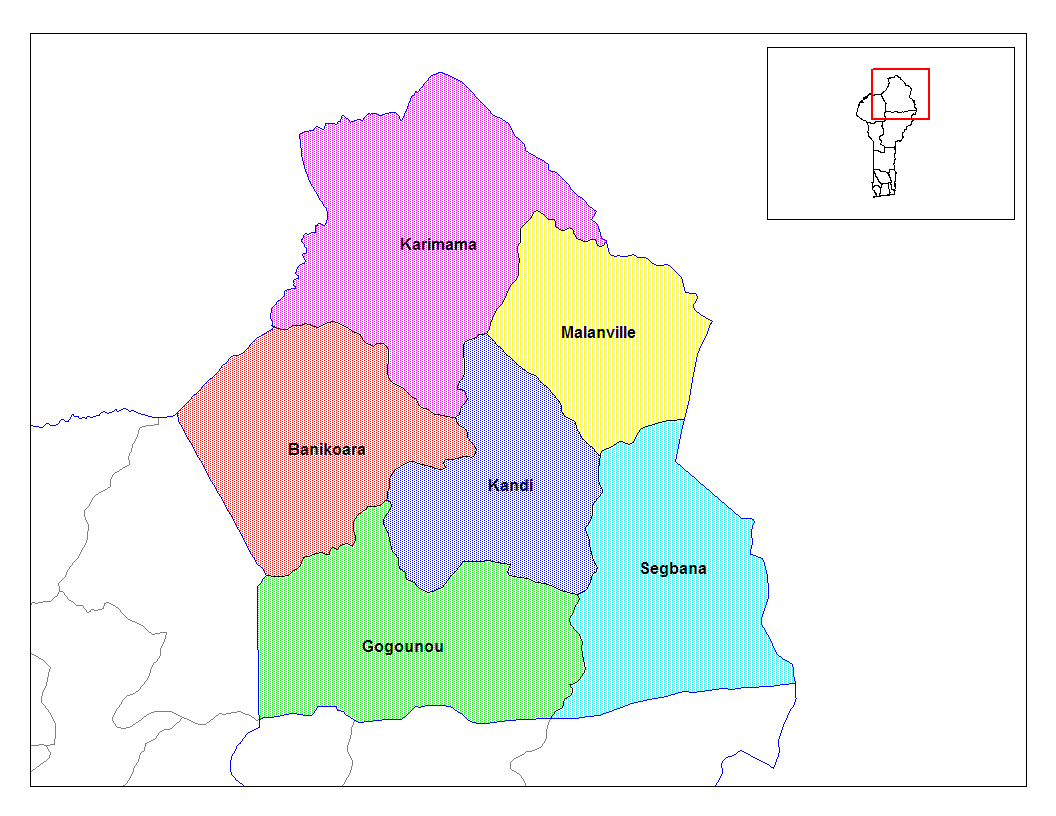
Communes of Alibori

1. Banikoara
2. Gogounou
3. Kandi
4. Karimama
5. Malanville
6. Segbana

== Atakora ==
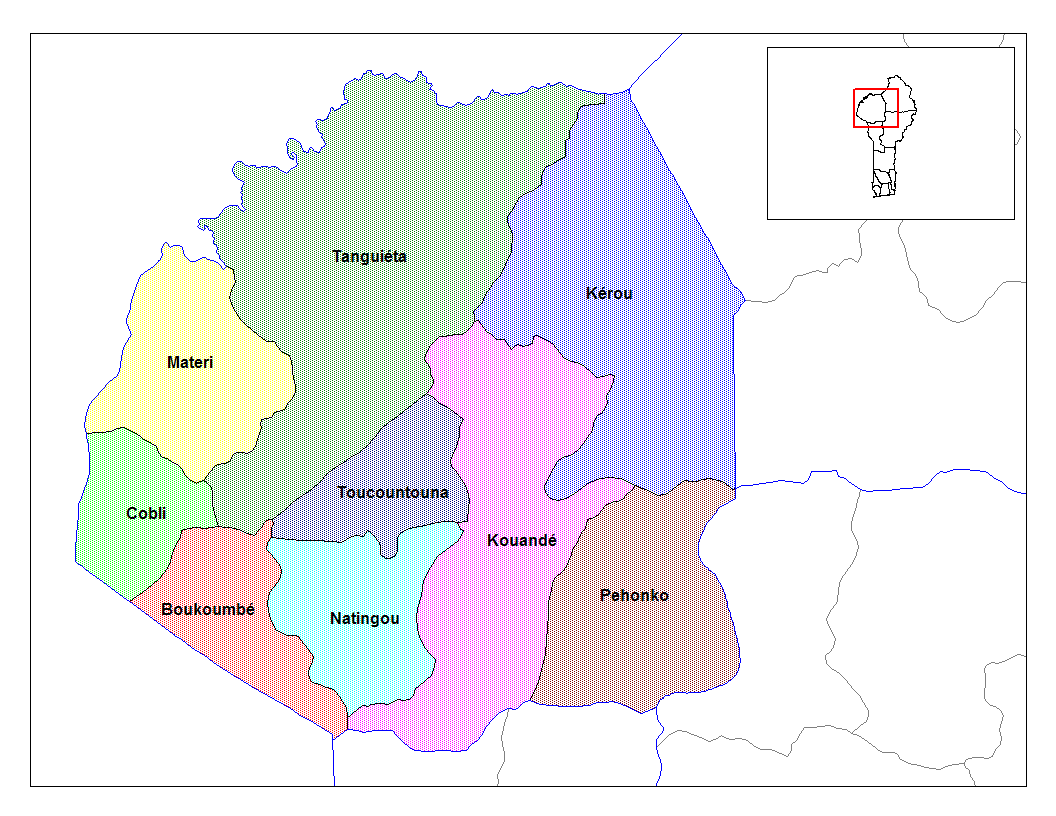
Communes of Atakora

1. Boukoumbé
2. Cobly
3. Kérou
4. Kouandé
5. Matéri
6. Natitingou
7. Pehonko
8. Tanguiéta
9. Toucountouna

== Atlantique ==
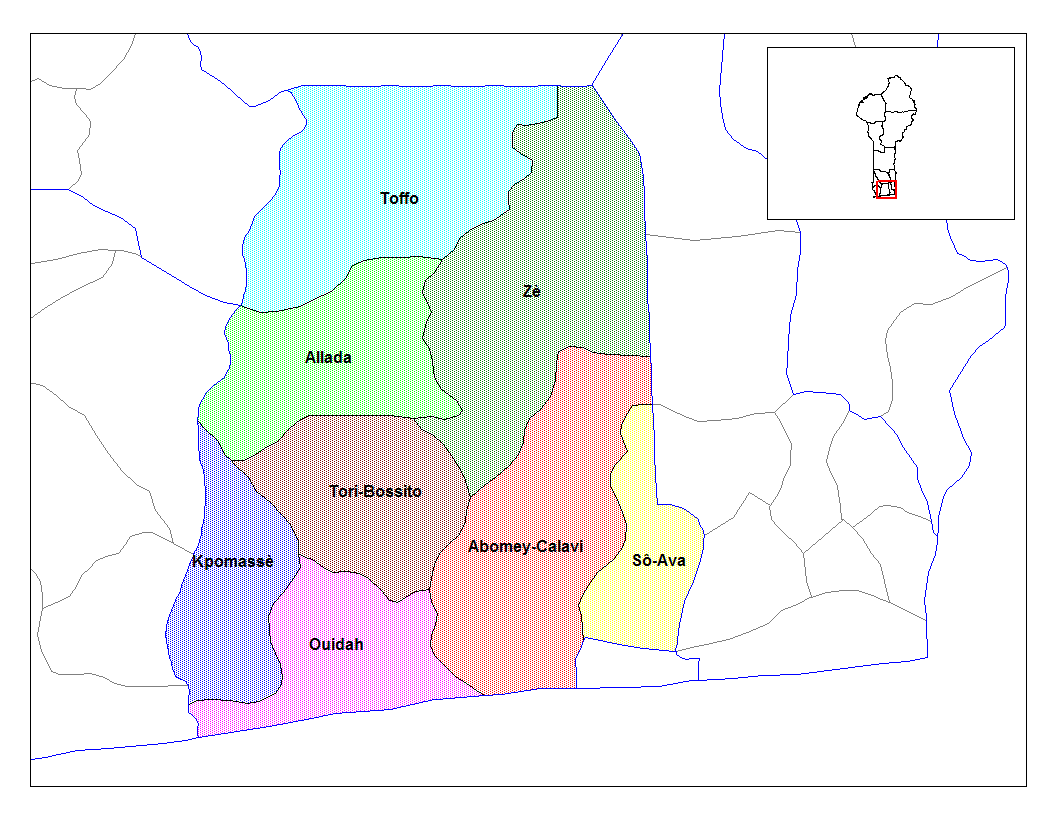
Communes of Atlantique

1. Abomey-Calavi
2. Allada
3. Kpomassè
4. Ouidah
5. Sô-Ava
6. Toffo
7. Tori-Bossito
8. Zè

== Borgou ==
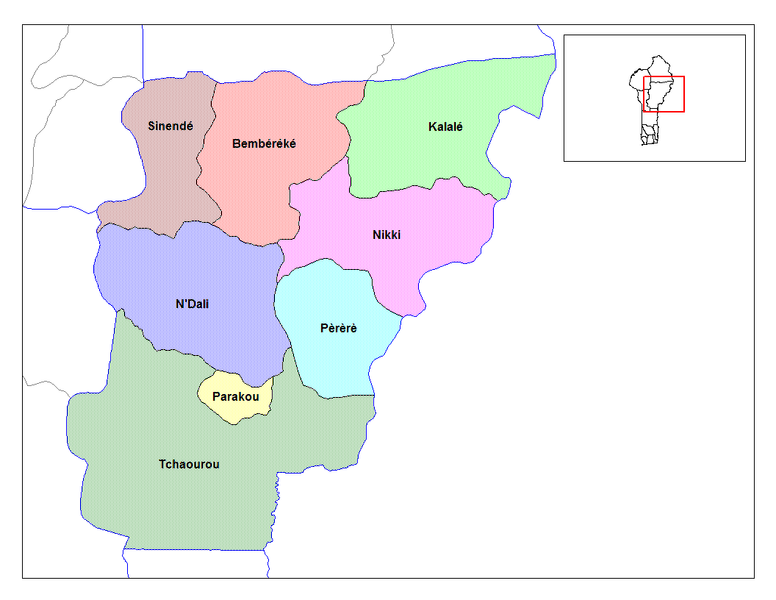
Communes of Borgou

1. Bembèrèkè
2. Kalalé
3. N'Dali
4. Nikki
5. Parakou
6. Pèrèrè
7. Sinendé
8. Tchaourou

== Collines ==
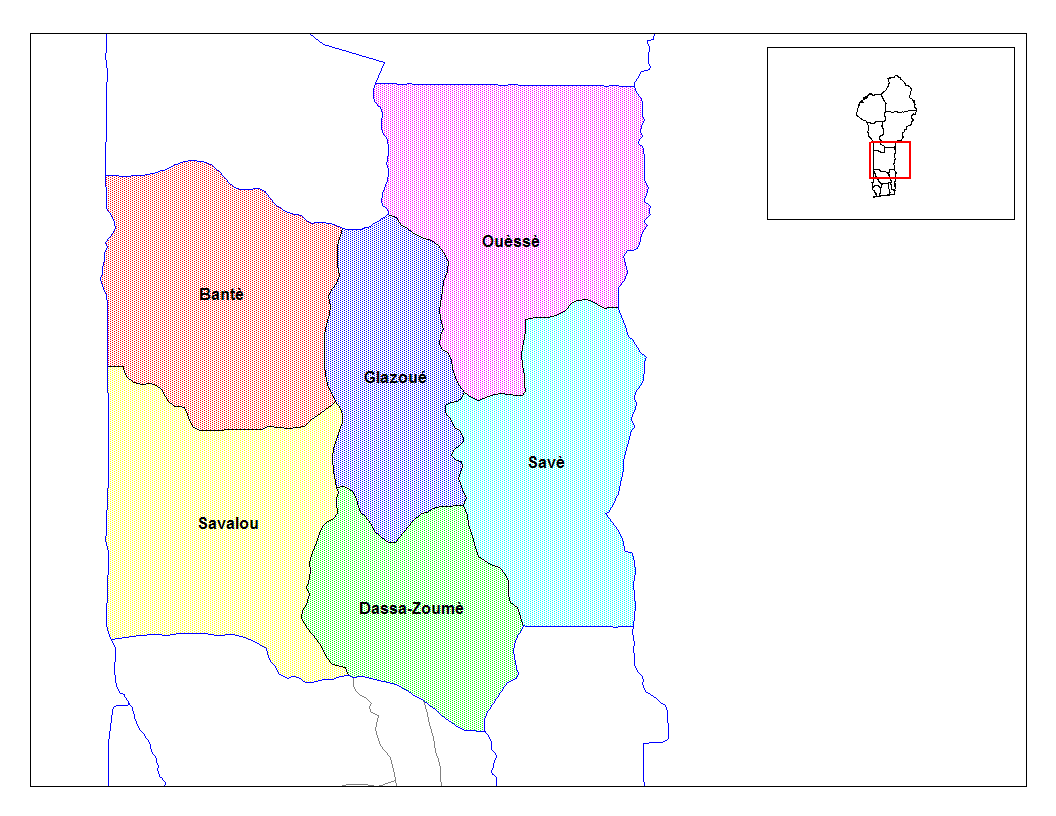
Communes of Collines

1. Bantè
2. Dassa-Zoumè
3. Glazoué
4. Ouèssè
5. Savalou
6. Savé

== Donga ==
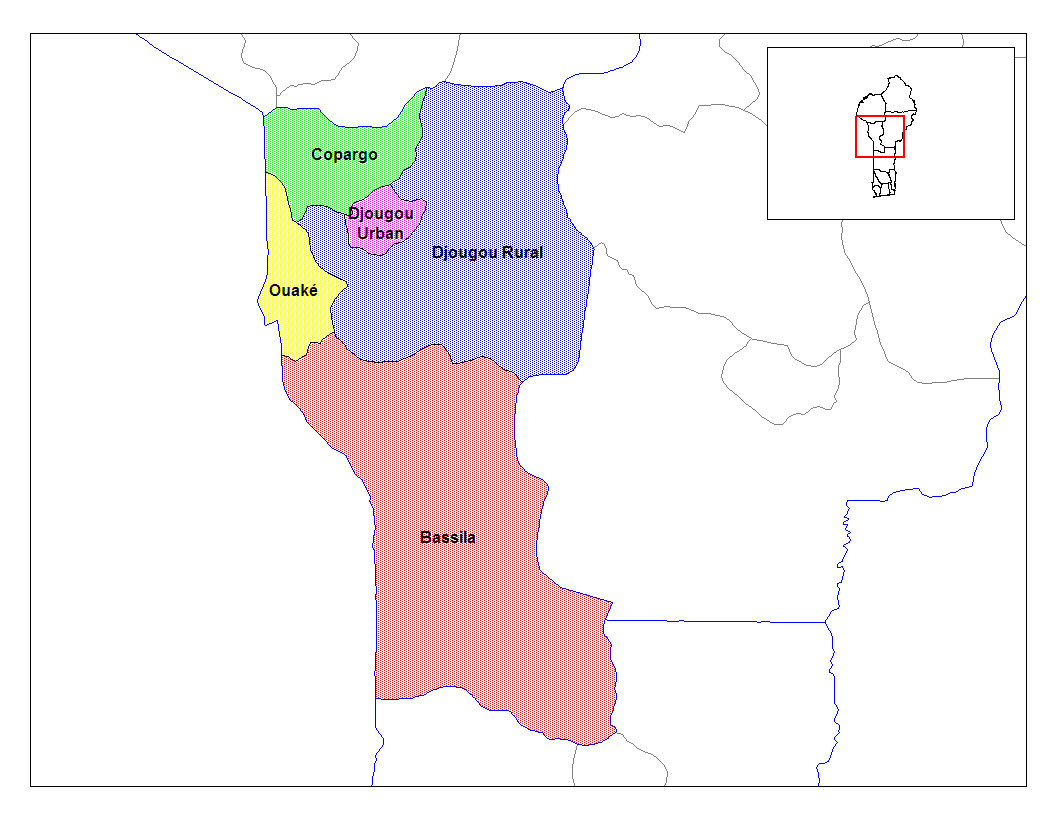
Communes of Donga

1. Bassila
2. Copargo
3. Djougou
4. Ouaké

== Kouffo ==
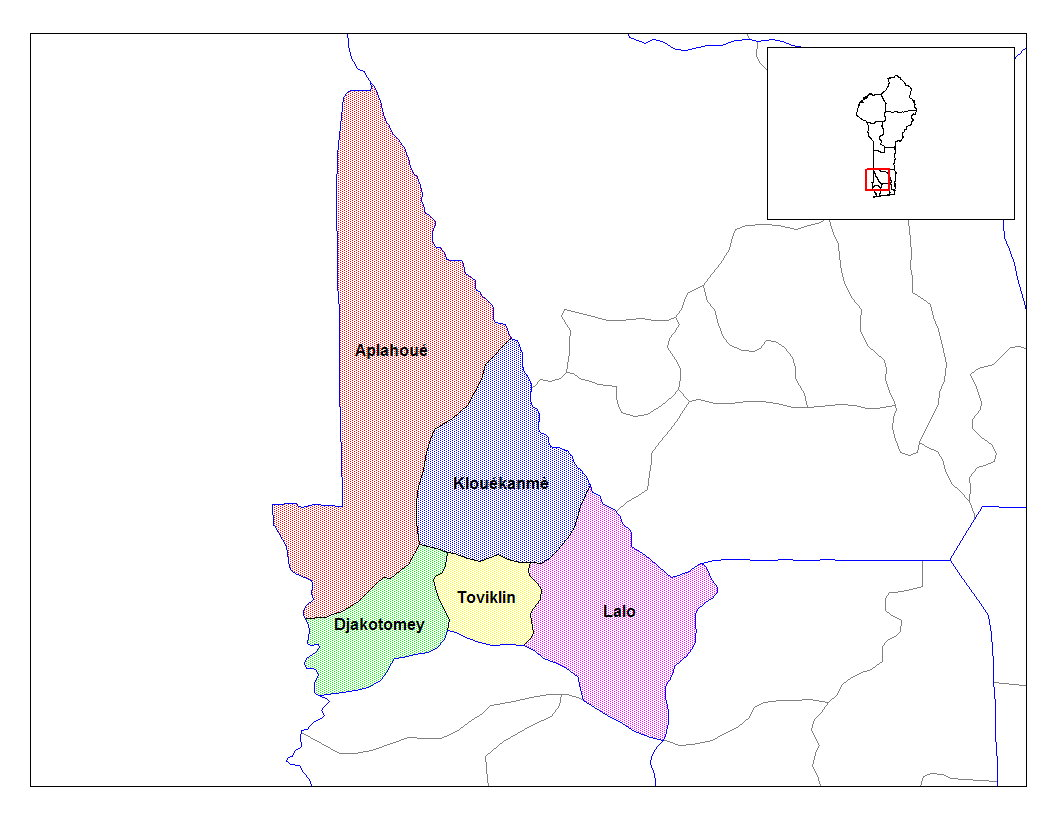
Communes of Kouffo

1. Aplahoué
2. Djakotomey
3. Klouékanmè
4. Lalo
5. Toviklin
6. Dogbo-Tota

== Littoral ==
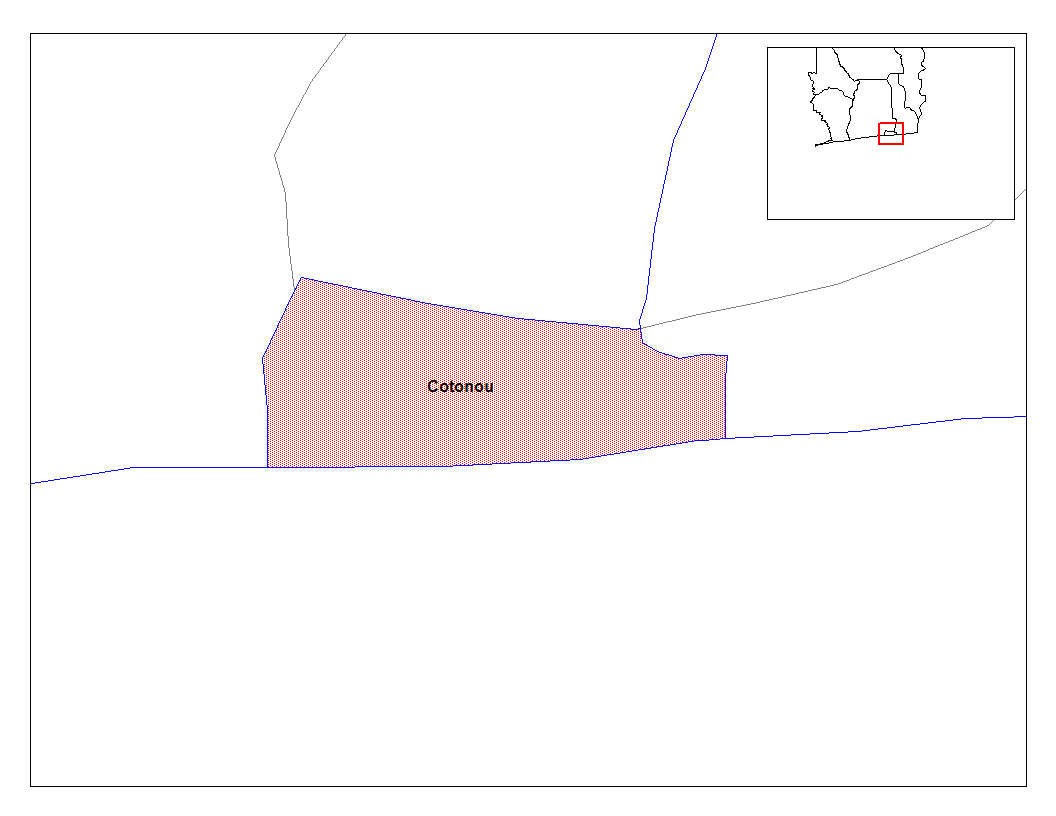
Communes of Littoral

1. Cotonou

== Mono ==
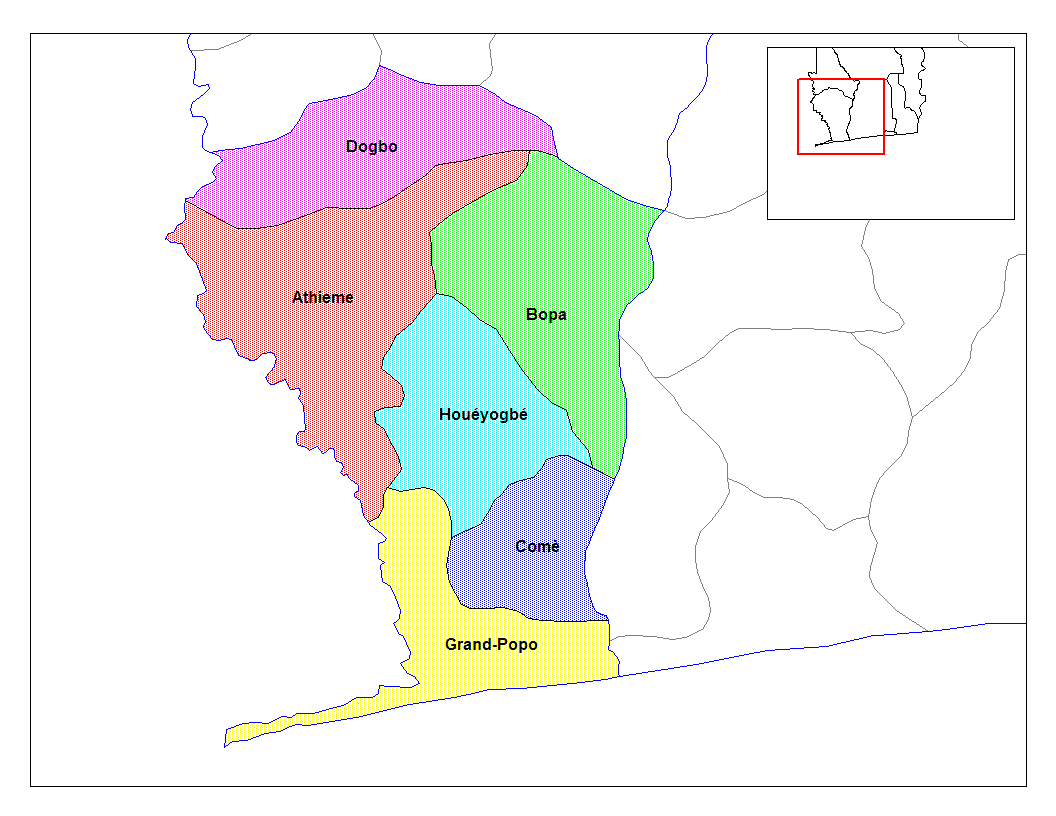
Communes of Mono

1. Athiémé
2. Bopa
3. Comé
4. Grand-Popo
5. Houéyogbé
6. Lokossa

== Ouémé ==
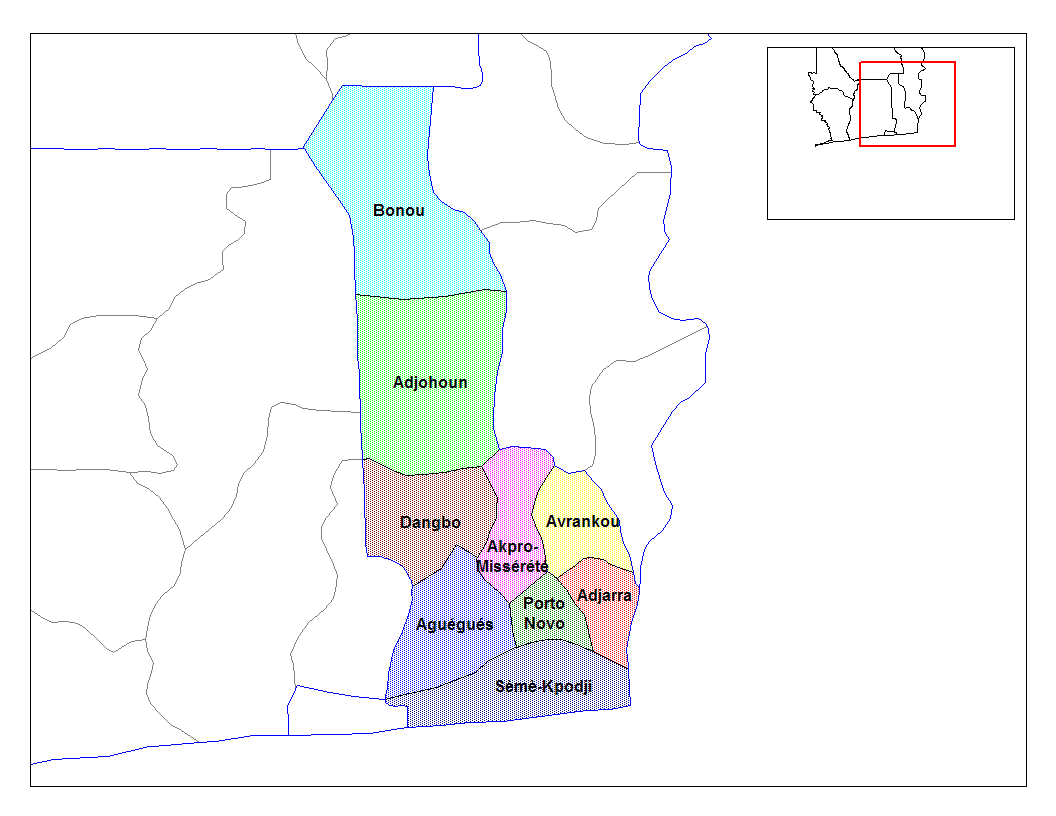
Communes of Ouémé

1. Adjarra
2. Adjohoun
3. Aguégués
4. Akpro-Missérété
5. Avrankou
6. Bonou
7. Dangbo
8. Porto-Novo
9. Sèmè-Kpodji

== Plateau ==
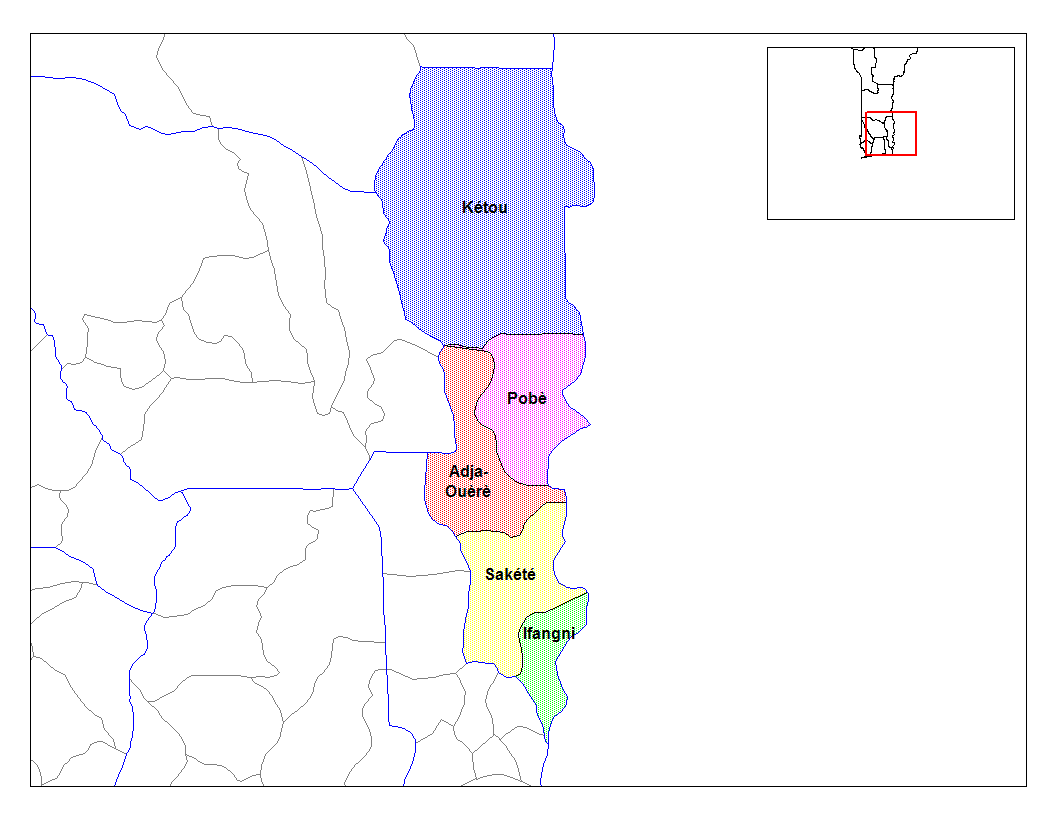
Communes of Plateau

1. Ifangni
2. Adja-Ouèrè
3. Kétou
4. Pobè
5. Sakété

== Zou ==
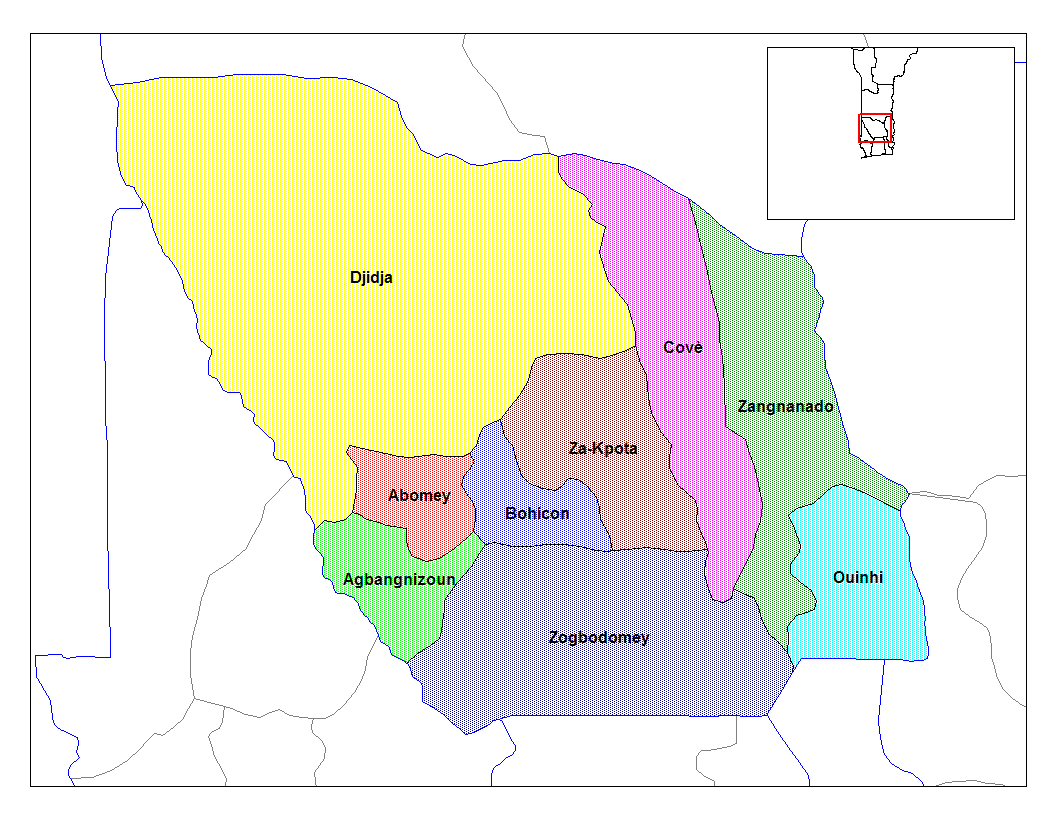
Communes of Zou

1. Abomey
2. Agbangnizoun
3. Bohicon
4. Cové
5. Djidja
6. Ouinhi
7. Za-Kpota
8. Zangnanado
9. Zogbodomey

== Sources ==
- "Departments of Benin". Statoids.
- http://www.ambassade-benin.org/article20.html (French)
