= Adjaha =

Coordinates: 6°19′N 1°50′E

- Arrondissement
- Interactive map of Adjaha
- Country: Benin
- Department: Mono Department
- Commune: Grand-Popo

Population (2002)
  - Total: 5,787
- Time zone: UTC+1 (WAT)

Adjaha is an arrondissement in the Mono department of Benin. It is an administrative division under the jurisdiction of the commune of Grand-Popo. According to the population census conducted by the Institut National de la Statistique Benin on February 15, 2002, the arrondissement had a total population of 5,787.

== History ==
Adjaha is a town in south Bénin. Adjaha has 8 villages: Adjaha, Konho, Cotocoli, Kpovidji, Seho-kondi, Todjonukoin, Tokpa-monoto, and Tokpa-Ayizo. Different races are living in Adjaha like Pedah, Fon, Kotafon, and Aïzo. Adjaha is located at the center of Grand-popo region.
