= Hévié =

- Arrondissement and town
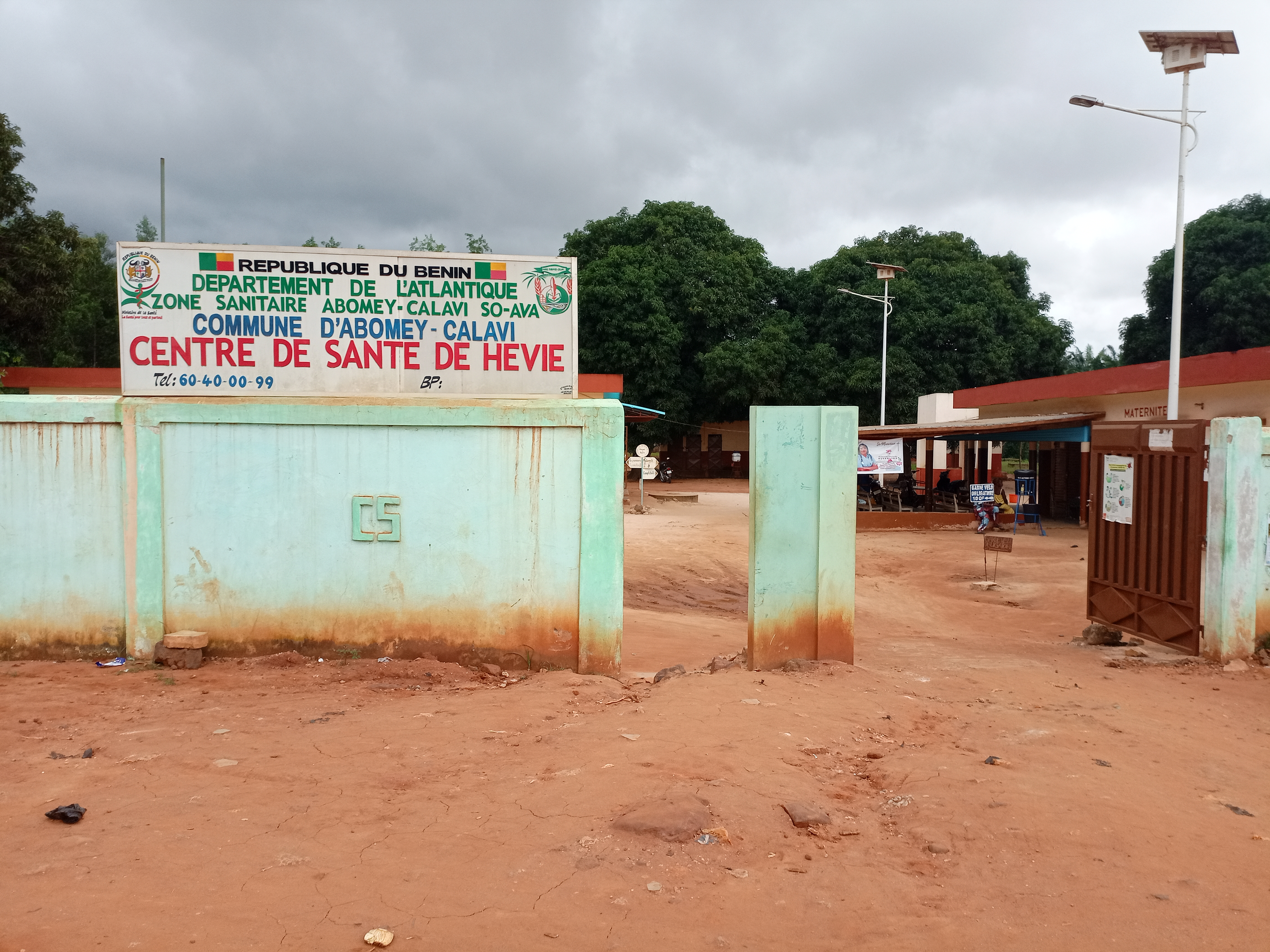

- Location in Benin
- Coordinates: 6°25′N 2°15′E
- Country: Benin
- Department: Atlantique Department
- Commune: Abomey-Calavi

Population (2002)
  - Total: 13,450
- Time zone: UTC+1 (WAT)

Hévié is a town and arrondissement in the Atlantique Department of southern Benin. It is an administrative division under the jurisdiction of the commune of Abomey-Calavi. According to the population census conducted by the Institut National de la Statistique Benin on February 15, 2002, the arrondissement had a total population of 13,450.
