= Lokogohoué =

Coordinates: 6.8000°N 1.7830°E

- Arrondissement
- Interactive map of Lokogohoué
- Country: Benin
- Department: Kouffo Department
- Commune: Dogbo-Tota

Population (2002)
  - Total: 8,567
- Time zone: UTC+1 (WAT)

Lokogohoué is an arrondissement in the Kouffo department of Benin. It is an administrative division under the jurisdiction of the commune of Dogbo-Tota. According to the population census conducted by the Institut National de la Statistique Benin on February 15, 2002, the arrondissement had a total population of 8,567.
