= Kinkinhoué =

Coordinates: 6°55′N 1°43′E

- Arrondissement
- Interactive map of Kinkinhoué
- Country: Benin
- Department: Kouffo Department
- Commune: Djakotomey

Population (2002)
  - Total: 4,988
- Time zone: UTC+1 (WAT)

Kinkinhoué is an arrondissement in the Kouffo department of Benin. It is an administrative division under the jurisdiction of the commune of Djakotomey. According to the population census conducted by the Institut National de la Statistique Benin on February 15, 2002, the arrondissement had a total population of 4,988.
