= Agamé =

Coordinates: 6°44′N 1°46′E

- Arrondissement
- Interactive map of Agamé
- Country: Benin
- Department: Mono Department
- Commune: Lokossa

Population (2002)
  - Total: 11,465
- Time zone: UTC+1 (WAT)

Agamé is an arrondissement in the Mono department of Benin. It is an administrative division under the jurisdiction of the commune of Lokossa. According to the population census conducted by the Institut National de la Statistique Benin on February 15, 2002, the arrondissement had a total population of 11,465.
