= Avagbodji =

Coordinates: 6°27′12″N 2°31′39″E

- Arrondissement
- Interactive map of Avagbodji
- Country: Benin
- Department: Ouémé Department
- Commune: Aguegues

Population (2002)
  - Total: 8,668
- Time zone: UTC+1 (WAT)

Avagbodji is an arrondissement in the Ouémé department of Benin. It is an administrative division under the jurisdiction of the commune of Aguegues. According to the population census conducted by the Institut National de la Statistique Benin on February 15, 2002, the arrondissement had a total population of 8668.
