= Tannou-Gola =

Coordinates: 6.8839°N 1.8173°E

- Arrondissement
- Interactive map of Tannou-Gola
- Country: Benin
- Department: Kouffo Department
- Commune: Toviklin

Population (2002)
  - Total: 5,893
- Time zone: UTC+1 (WAT)

Tannou-Gola is an arrondissement in the Kouffo department of Benin. It is an administrative division under the jurisdiction of the commune of Toviklin. According to the population census conducted by the Institut National de la Statistique Benin on February 15, 2002, the arrondissement had a total population of 5,893.
