= Kpinnou =

Coordinates: 6.5997°N 1.7408°E

- Arrondissement
- Interactive map of Kpinnou
- Country: Benin
- Department: Mono Department
- Commune: Athiémè

Population (2002)
  - Total: 7,630
- Time zone: UTC+1 (WAT)

Kpinnou is an arrondissement in the Mono department of Benin. It is an administrative division under the jurisdiction of the commune of Athiémè. According to the population census conducted by the Institut National de la Statistique Benin on February 15, 2002, the arrondissement had a total population of 7,630.
