= Ganvié I =

Coordinates: 6°28′N 2°25′E

- Arrondissement
- Interactive map of Ganvié I
- Country: Benin
- Department: Atlantique Department
- Commune: Sô-Ava

Population (2002)
  - Total: 10,280
- Time zone: UTC+1 (WAT)

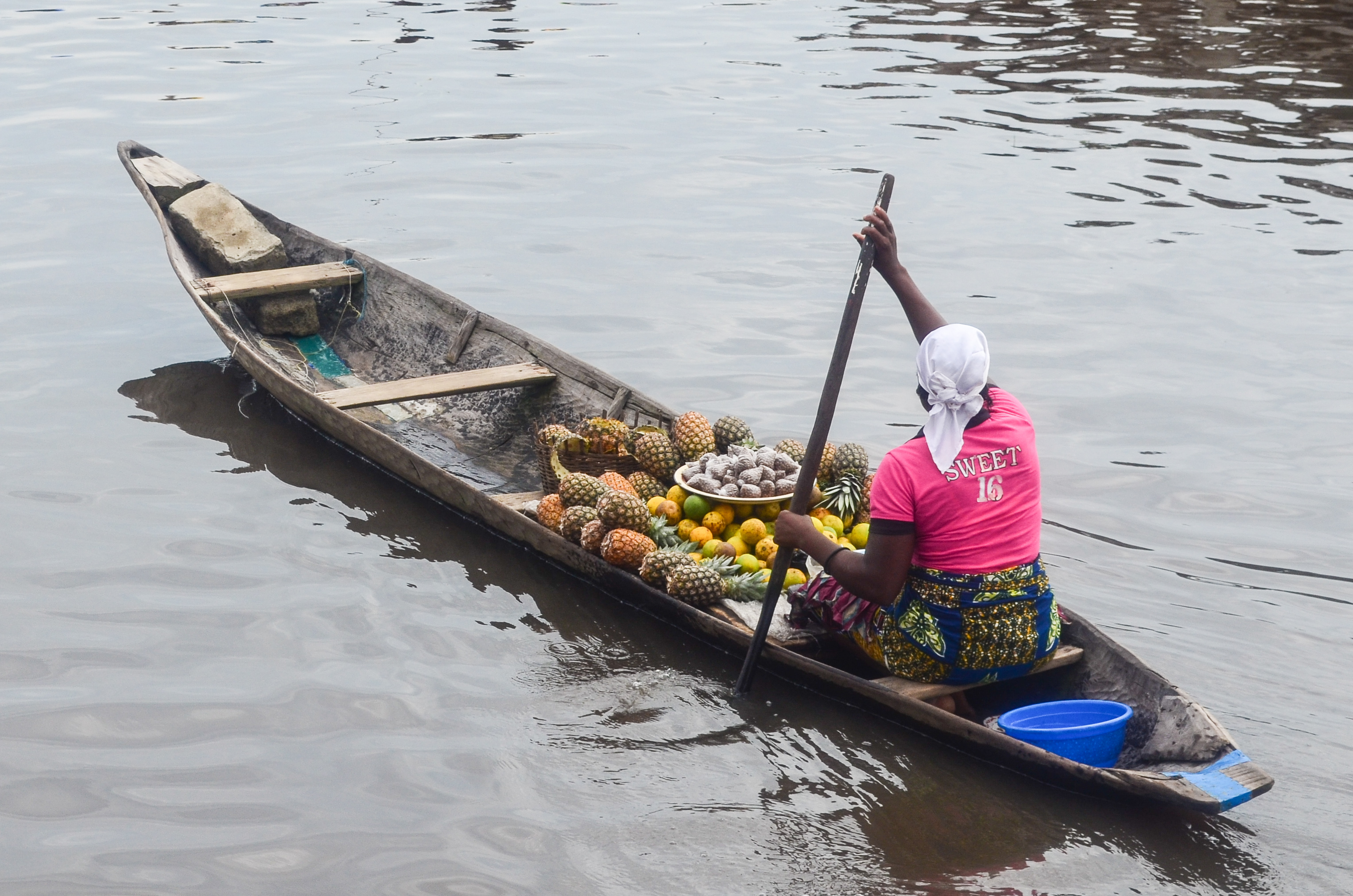
A woman transporting food in Ganvié I

Ganvié I is an arrondissement in the Atlantique Department of southern Benin. It is an administrative division under the jurisdiction of the commune of Sô-Ava. According to the population census conducted by the Institut National de la Statistique Benin on February 15, 2002, the arrondissement had a total population of 10,280.
