= Ganvié II =

Coordinates: 6.4963°N 2.4268°E

- Arrondissement
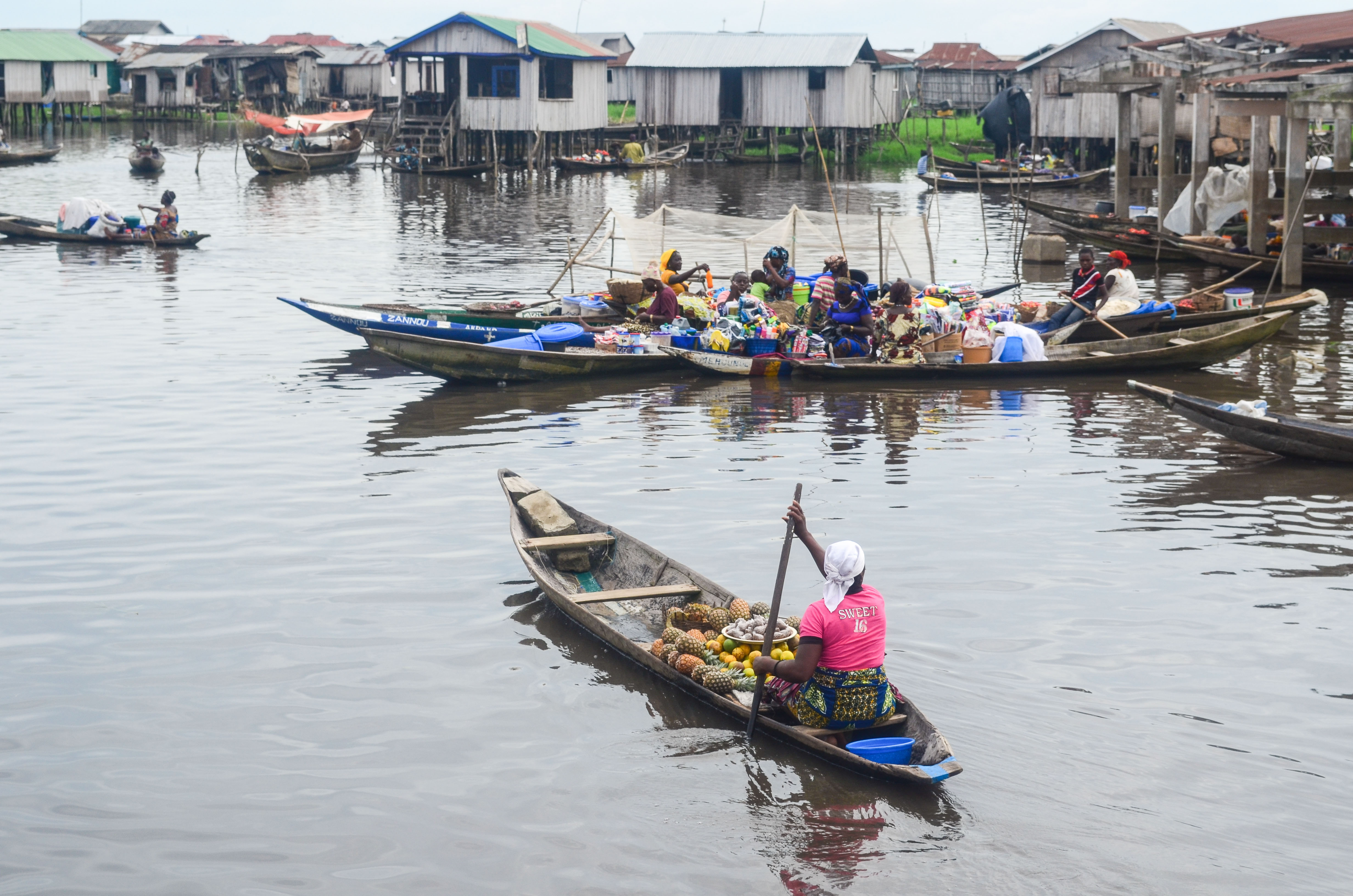
- Floating market in Ganvié II
- Interactive map of Ganvié II
- Country: Benin
- Department: Atlantique Department
- Commune: Sô-Ava

Population (2002)
  - Total: 10,288
- Time zone: UTC+1 (WAT)

Ganvié II is an arrondissement in the Atlantique Department of southern Benin. It is an administrative division under the jurisdiction of the commune of Sô-Ava. According to the population census conducted by the Institut National de la Statistique Benin on February 15, 2002, the arrondissement had a total population of 10,288.
