= Arrondissements of Benin =

Administrative territorial entity of Benin

Arrondissements are administrative units of Benin, after departments and communes. In turn they contain villages and may often have several quartiers or city districts/urban neighborhoods. There are currently 545 arrondissements.

The arrondissements, ordered by department and commune, are as follows:

== Alibori Department ==
=== Banikoara ===
Banikoara, Founougo, Gomparou, Goumori, Kokey, Kokiborou, Ounet, Sompérékou, Soroko, Toura

=== Gogounou ===
Bagou, Gogounou, Gounarou, Ouara, Sori, Zoungou-Pantrossi

=== Kandi ===
Angaradébou, Bensékou, Donwari, Kandi I, Kandi II, Kandi III, Kassakou, Saah, Sam, Sonsoro

=== Karimama ===
Birni-Lafia, Bogo-Bogo, Karimama, Kompa, Monsey

=== Malanville ===
Garou, Guénè, Malanville, Mandécali, Tomboutou

=== Ségbana ===
Libantè, Liboussou, Lougou, Ségbana, Sokotindji

== Atakora Department ==
=== Boukoumbé ===
Boukoumbé, Dipoli, Korontière, Kossoucoingou, Manta, Natta, Tabota

=== Cobly ===
Cobly, Datori, Kountori, Tapoga

=== Kérou ===
Brignamaro, Firou, Kérou, Koabagou

=== Kouandé ===
Birni, Chabi-Couma, Fô-Tancé, Guilmaro, Kouandé, Oroukayo

=== Matéri ===
Dassari, Gouandé, Matéri, Nodi, Tantéga, Tchianhoun-Cossi

=== Natitingou ===
Kotapounga, Kouaba, Koundata, Natitingou I, Natitingou II, Natitingou III, Natitingou IV, Perma, Tchoumi-Tchoumi

=== Péhunco ===
Gnémasson, Péhunco, Tobré

=== Tanguiéta ===
Cotiakou, N'Dahonta, Taiakou, Tanguiéta, Tanongou

=== Toucountouna ===
Kouarfa, Tampégré, Toucountouna

== Atlantique Department ==
=== Abomey-Calavi ===
Abomey-Calavi, Akassato, Godomey, Glo-Djigbé, Hévié, Kpanroun, Ouédo, Togba, Zinvié

=== Allada ===
Agbanou, Ahouannonzoun, Allada, Attogon, Avakpa, Ayou, Hinvi, Lissègazoun, Lon-Agonmey, Sékou, Togoudo, Tokpa-Avagoudo

=== Kpomassè ===
Aganmalomè, Agbanto, Agonkanmè, Dedomè, Dekanmè, Kpomassè, Ségbeya, Ségbohoué, Tokpa-Domè

=== Ouidah ===
Avlékété, Djégbadji, Gakpè, Ouakpé-Daho, Ouidah I, Ouidah II, Ouidah III, Ouidah IV, Pahou, Savi

=== Sô-Ava ===
Ahomey-Lokpo, Dékanmey, Ganvié I, Ganvié II, Houédo-Aguékon, Sô-Ava, Vekky

=== Toffo ===
Agué, Colli-Agbamè, Coussi, Damè, Djanglanmè, Houégbo, Kpomé, Sè, Séhouè, Toffo-Agué

=== Tori-Bossito ===
Avamè, Azohouè-Aliho, Azohouè-Cada, Tori-Bossito, Tori-Cada, Tori-Gare

=== Zè ===
Adjan, Dawé, Djigbé, Dodji-Bata, Hékanmè, Koundokpoè, Sèdjè-Dénou, Sèdjè-Houégoudo, Tangbo-Djevié, Yokpo, Zè

== Borgou Department ==
=== Bembèrèkè ===
Bembèrèkè, Béroubouay, Bouanri, Gomia, Ina

=== Kalalè ===
Basso, Bouka, Dèrassi, Dunkassa, Kalalè, Péonga

=== N'Dali ===
Bori, Gbégourou, N'Dali, Ouénou, Sirarou

=== Nikki ===
Biro, Gnonkourakali, Nikki, Ouénou, Sérékalé, Suya, Tasso

=== Parakou ===
1st arrondissement, 2nd arrondissement, 3rd arrondissement

=== Pèrèrè ===
Gninsy, Guinagourou, Kpané, Pébié, Pèrèrè, Sontou

=== Sinendé ===
Fô-Bourè, Sèkèrè, Sikki, Sinendé

=== Tchaourou ===
Alafiarou, Bétérou, Goro, Kika, Sanson, Tchaourou, Tchatchou

== Collines Department ==
=== Bantè ===
Agoua, Akpassi, Atokoligbé, Bantè, Bobè, Gouka, Koko, Lougba, Pira

=== Dassa-Zoumè ===
Akofodjoulè, Dassa I, Dassa II, Gbaffo, Kèrè, Kpingni, Lèma, Paouingnan, Soclogbo, Tré

=== Glazoué ===
Aklankpa, Assanté, Glazoué, Gomè, Kpakpaza, Magoumi, Ouèdèmè, Sokponta, Thio, Zaffé

=== Ouèssè ===
Challa-Ogoi, Djègbè, Gbanlin, Kèmon, Kilibo, Laminou, Odougba, Ouèssè, Toui

=== Savalou ===
Djaloukou, Doumè, Gobada, Kpataba, Lahotan, Lèma, Logozohoué, Monkpa, Ottola, Ouèssè, Savalou-Aga, Savalou-Agbado, Savalou-Attakè, Tchetti

=== Savé ===
Adido, Bèssè, Boni, Kaboua, Ofè, Okpara, Plateau, Sakin

== Donga Department ==
=== Bassila ===
Alédjo, Bassila, Manigri, Pénéssoulou

=== Copargo ===
Anandana, Copargo, Pabégou, Singré

=== Djougou ===
Barei, Bariénou, Bélléfoungou, Bougou, Djougou I, Djougou II, Djougou III, Kolokondé, Onklou, Patargo, Pélébina, Sérou

=== Ouaké ===
Badjoudè, Kondé, Ouaké, Sèmèrè I, Sèmèrè II, Tchalinga

== Kouffo Department ==
=== Aplahoué ===
Aplahoué, Atomè, Azovè, Dekpo, Godohou, Kissamey, Lonkly

=== Djakotomey ===
Adjintimey, Bètoumey, Djakotomey I, Djakotomey II, Gohomey, Houègamey, Kinkinhoué, Kokohoué, Kpoba, Sokouhoué

=== Dogbo ===
Ayomi, Dèvè, Honton, Lokogohoué, Madjrè, Tota, Totchagni

=== Klouékanmè ===
Adjanhonmè, Ahogbèya, Aya-Hohoué, Djotto, Hondji, Klouékanmè, Lanta, Tchikpé

=== Lalo ===
Adoukandji, Ahondjinnako, Ahomadégbé, Banigbé, Gnizounmè, Hlassamè, Lalo, Lokogba, Tchito, Tohou, Zalli

=== Toviklin ===
Adjido, Avédjin, Doko, Houédogli, Missinko, Tannou-Gola, Toviklin

== Littoral Department ==
=== Cotonou ===
1st arrondissement, 2nd arrondissement, 3rd arrondissement, 4th arrondissement, 5th arrondissement, 6th arrondissement, 7th arrondissement, 8th arrondissement, 9th arrondissement, 10th arrondissement, 11th arrondissement, 12th arrondissement, 13th arrondissement

== Mono Department ==
=== Athiémè ===
Adohoun, Atchannou, Athiémè, Dédékpoé, Kpinnou

=== Bopa ===
Agbodji, Badazoui, Bopa, Gbakpodji, Lobogo, Possotomè, Yégodoé

=== Comè ===
Agatogbo, Akodéha, Comè, Ouèdèmè-Pédah, Oumako

=== Grand-Popo ===
Adjaha, Agoué, Avloh, Djanglanmey, Gbéhoué, Grand-Popo, Sazoué

=== Houéyogbé ===
Dahé, Doutou, Honhoué, Houéyogbé, Sè, Zoungbonou

=== Lokossa ===
Agamé, Houin, Houèdèmè-Adja, Koudo, Lokossa

== Ouémé Department ==
=== Adjarra ===
Adjarra I, Adjarra II, Aglogbé, Honvié, Malanhoui, Médédjonou

=== Adjohoun ===
Adjohoun, Akpadanou, Awonou, Azowlissè, Dèmè, Gangban, Kodè, Togbota

=== Aguegues ===
Avagbodji, Houédomè, Zoungamè

=== Akpro-Missérété ===
Akpro-Missérété, Gomè-Sota, Katagon, Vakon, Zoungbomè

=== Avrankou ===
Atchoukpa, Avrankou, Djomon, Gbozounmè, Kouty, Ouanho, Sado

=== Bonou ===
Affamè, Atchonsa, Bonou, Damè-Wogon, Houinviguè

=== Dangbo ===
Dangbo, Dékin, Gbéko, Houédomey, Hozin, Késsounou, Zounguè

=== Porto-Novo ===
1st arrondissement, 2nd arrondissement, 3rd arrondissement, 4th arrondissement, 5th arrondissement

=== Sèmè-Kpodji ===
Agblangandan, Aholouyèmè, Djrègbè, Ekpè, Sèmè-Kpodji, Tohouè

== Plateau Department ==
=== Adja-Ouèrè ===
Adja-Ouèrè, Ikpinlè, Kpoulou, Massè, Oko-Akarè, Totonnoukon

=== Ifangni ===
Banigbé, Daagbé, Ifangni, Ko-Koumolou, Lagbé, Tchaada

=== Kétou ===
Adakplamé, Idigny, Kpankou, Kétou, Odometa, Okpometa

=== Pobè ===
Ahoyéyé, Igana, Issaba, Pobè, Towé

=== Sakété ===
Aguidi, Ita-Djèbou, Sakété I, Sakété II, Takon, Yoko

== Zou Department ==
=== Abomey ===
Agbokpa, Dètohou, Djègbè, Hounli, Sèhoun, Vidolè, Zounzounmè

=== Agbangnizoun ===
Adahondjigon, Adingningon, Agbangnizoun, Kinta, Kpota, Lissazounmè, Sahé, Siwé, Tanvé, Zoungoudo

=== Bohicon ===
Agongointo, Avogbana, Bohicon I, Bohicon II, Gnidjazoun, Lissèzoun, Ouassaho, Passagon, Saclo, Sodohomè

=== Covè ===
Adogbé, Gounli, Houéko, Houen-Hounso, Lainta-Cogbè, Naogon, Soli, Zogba

=== Djidja ===
Agondji, Agouna, Dan, Djidja, Dohouimè, Gobè, Monsourou, Mougnon, Oungbègamè, Outo, Setto, Zoukou

=== Ouinhi ===
Dasso, Ouinhi, Sagon, Tohoué

=== Za-Kpota ===
Allahé, Assalin, Houngomey, Kpakpamè, Kpozoun, Za-Kpota, Za-Tanta, Zèko

=== Zagnanado ===
Agonli-Houégbo, Banamè, Don-Tan, Dovi, Kpédékpo, Zagnanado

=== Zogbodomey ===
Akiza, Avlamè, Cana I, Cana II, Domè, Koussoukpa, Kpokissa, Massi, Tanwé-Hessou, Zogbodomey, Zoukou
