= Sodohomè =

Coordinates: 7.1867°N 2.1206°E

- Arrondissement
- Interactive map of Sodohomè
- Country: Benin
- Department: Zou Department
- Commune: Bohicon

Population (2002)
  - Total: 11,429
- Time zone: UTC+1 (WAT)

Sodohomè is an arrondissement in the Zou department of Benin. It is an administrative division under the jurisdiction of the commune of Bohicon. According to the population census conducted by the Institut National de la Statistique Benin on February 15, 2002, the arrondissement had a total population of 11,429.

== Demographics and Administration ==
According to the 2013 census by the Beninese National Institute of Statistics and Economic Studies (INSAE), the arrondissement had 18,814 inhabitants, of whom 9,023 were male and 9,791 were female.
