= Zoungbomè =

Coordinates: 6.5510°N 2.5931°E

- Arrondissement
- Interactive map of Zoungbomè
- Country: Benin
- Department: Ouémé Department
- Commune: Akpro-Missérété

Population (2002)
  - Total: 8,964
- Time zone: UTC+1 (WAT)

Zoungbomè is an arrondissement in the Ouémé department of Benin. It is an administrative division under the jurisdiction of the commune of Akpro-Missérété. According to the population census conducted by the Institut National de la Statistique Benin on February 15, 2002, the arrondissement had a total population of 8964.
