= Golo-Djigbé =

- Arrondissement and town
- Location within Benin
- Coordinates: 6°32′25″N 2°19′31″E
- Country: Benin
- Department: Atlantique Department
- Commune: Abomey-Calavi

Population (2013)
  - Total: 28,103
- Time zone: UTC+1 (WAT)

Golo-Djigbé is a town and arrondissement in the Atlantique Department of southern Benin. It is an administrative division under the jurisdiction of the commune of Abomey-Calavi. The population is 28,103 in 2013.

== Transport ==
The district is planned to be the site for the proposed new Golo-Djigbé International Airport, which had been scheduled for delivery in December 2020.
