= Késsounou =

Coordinates: 6.5535°N 2.5062°E

- Arrondissement
- Interactive map of Késsounou
- Country: Benin
- Department: Ouémé Department
- Commune: Dangbo

Population (2002)
  - Total: 9,802
- Time zone: UTC+1 (WAT)

Késsounou is an arrondissement in the Ouémé department of Benin. It is an administrative division under the jurisdiction of the commune of Dangbo. According to the population census conducted by the Institut National de la Statistique Benin on February 15, 2002, the arrondissement had a total population of 9,802.
