= Médédjonou =

Coordinates: 6.4619°N 2.6774°E

- Arrondissement
- Interactive map of Médédjonou
- Country: Benin
- Department: Ouémé Department
- Commune: Adjarra

Population (2002)
  - Total: 13,959
- Time zone: UTC+1 (WAT)

Médédjonou is an arrondissement in the Ouémé department of Benin. It is an administrative division under the jurisdiction of the commune of Adjarra. According to the Institut National de la Statistique Benin census of February 15, 2002, the arrondissement had a total population of 13,959.
