= Adjarra II =

Coordinates: 6.5333°N 2.6667°E

- Arrondissement
- Interactive map of Adjarra II
- Country: Benin
- Department: Ouémé Department
- Commune: Adjarra

Population (2002)
  - Total: 7,604
- Time zone: UTC+1 (WAT)

Adjarra II is an arrondissement in the Ouémé department of Benin. It is an administrative division under the jurisdiction of the commune of Adjarra. According to the population census conducted by the Institut National de la Statistique Benin on February 15, 2002, the arrondissement had a total population of 7604.
