= Badazoui =

Coordinates: 6°37′10″N 1°55′24″E

- Arrondissement
- Interactive map of Badazoui
- Country: Benin
- Department: Mono Department
- Commune: Bopa

Population (2002)
  - Total: 12,362
- Time zone: UTC+1 (WAT)

Badazoui is an arrondissement in the Mono department of Benin. It is an administrative division under the jurisdiction of the commune of Bopa. According to the population census conducted by the Institut National de la Statistique Benin on February 15, 2002, the arrondissement had a total population of 12,362.
