= Sokouhoué =

Coordinates: 6°54′N 1°40′E

- Arrondissement
- Interactive map of Sokouhoué
- Country: Benin
- Department: Kouffo Department
- Commune: Djakotomey

Population (2002)
  - Total: 11,998
- Time zone: UTC+1 (WAT)

Sokouhoué is an arrondissement in the Kouffo department of Benin. It is an administrative division under the jurisdiction of the commune of Djakotomey. According to the population census conducted by the Institut National de la Statistique Benin on February 15, 2002, the arrondissement had a total population of 11,998.
