= Kpané =

Coordinates: 9°44′N 3°02′E

- Arrondissement and town
- Interactive map of Kpané
- Country: Benin
- Department: Borgou Department
- Commune: Pèrèrè

Population (2002)
  - Total: 2,067
- Time zone: UTC+1 (WAT)

Kpané is a town and arrondissement in the Borgou Department of Benin. It is an administrative division under the jurisdiction of the commune of Pèrèrè. According to the population census conducted by the Institut National de la Statistique Benin on February 15, 2002, the arrondissement had a total population of 2,067.
