= Tohoué, Zou =

Coordinates: 7°04′59″N 2°28′51″E

Tohoué
- Arrondissement
- Interactive map of Tohoué
- Country: Benin
- Department: Zou Department
- Commune: Ouinhi

Population (2002)
  - Total: 5,000
- Time zone: UTC+1 (WAT)

Tohoué is an arrondissement in the Zou department of Benin. It is an administrative division under the jurisdiction of the commune of Ouinhi. According to the population census conducted by the Institut National de la Statistique Benin on February 15, 2002, the arrondissement had a total population of 5,000.
