= Anandana =

Coordinates: 9°57′N 1°23′E

- Arrondissement
- Interactive map of Anandana
- Country: Benin
- Department: Donga Department
- Commune: Copargo

Population (2002)
  - Total: 8,266
- Time zone: UTC+1 (WAT)

Anandana is an arrondissement in the Donga department of Benin. It is an administrative division under the jurisdiction of the commune of Copargo. According to the population census conducted by the Institut National de la Statistique Benin on February 15, 2002, the arrondissement had a total population of 8,266.
