= Togba, Benin =

Coordinates: 7°06′N 1°40′E

Togba
- Arrondissement and town
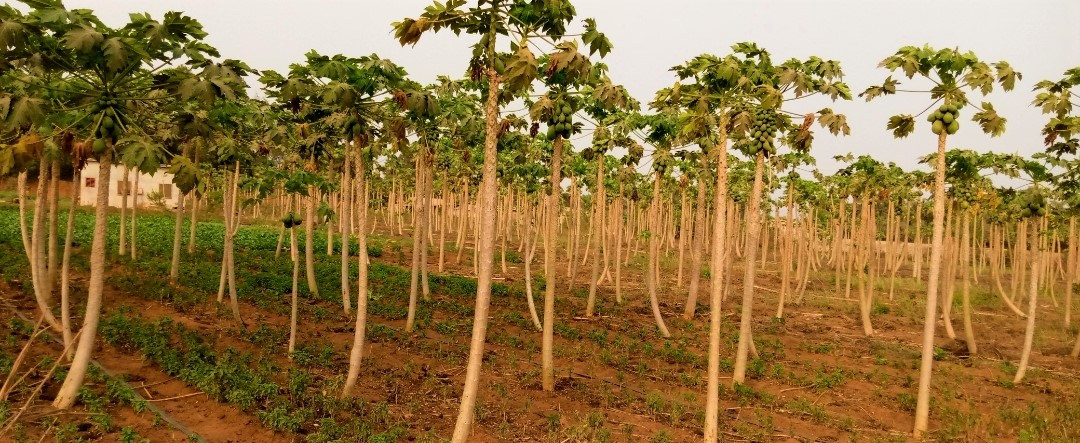
- Papaya field in Togba (Abomey-Calavi)
- Interactive map of Togba
- Country: Benin
- Department: Atlantique Department
- Commune: Abomey-Calavi

Population (2002)
  - Total: 18,674
- Time zone: UTC+1 (WAT)

Togba is a town and arrondissement in the Atlantique Department of southern Benin. It is an administrative division under the jurisdiction of the commune of Abomey-Calavi. According to the population census conducted by the Institut National de la Statistique Benin on February 15, 2002, the arrondissement had a total population of 18,674.
