= Dassa I =

Coordinates: 7°46′16″N 2°11′49″E

- Arrondissement
- Interactive map of Dassa I
- Country: Benin
- Department: Collines Department
- Commune: Dassa-Zoumé

Population (2002)
  - Total: 8,401
- Time zone: UTC+1 (WAT)

Dassa I is an arrondissement in the Collines department of Benin. It is an administrative division under the jurisdiction of the commune of Igbo Idaasha. According to the population census conducted by the Institut National de la Statistique Benin on February 15, 2002, the arrondissement had a total population of 8,401.
