= Azowlissè =

Coordinates: 6.6944°N 2.5075°E

- Arrondissement
- Interactive map of Azowlissè
- Country: Benin
- Department: Ouémé Department
- Commune: Adjohoun

Population (2002)
  - Total: 16,883
- Time zone: UTC+1 (WAT)

Azowlissè is an arrondissement in the Ouémé department of Benin. It is an administrative division under the jurisdiction of the commune of Adjohoun. According to the population census conducted by the Institut National de la Statistique Benin on February 15, 2002, the arrondissement had a total population of 16883.
