= Cotiakou =

Coordinates: 10.9572°N 1.5102°E

- Arrondissement and town
- Interactive map of Cotiakou
- Country: Benin
- Department: Atakora Department
- Commune: Tanguiéta

Population (2002)
  - Total: 9,163
- Time zone: UTC+1 (WAT)

Cotiakou is a town and arrondissement in the Atakora Department of northwestern Benin. It is an administrative division governed by the commune of Tanguiéta. According to the population census conducted by the Institut National de la Statistique Benin on February 15, 2002, the arrondissement had a total population of 9,163.
