= Gbégourou =

- Arrondissement and town
- Location in Benin
- Coordinates: 9°7′53″N 2°22′50″E
- Country: Benin
- Department: Borgou Department
- Commune: N'Dali

Population (2002)
  - Total: 5,757
- Time zone: UTC+1 (WAT)

Gbégourou is a town and arrondissement in the Borgou Department of Benin. It is an administrative division under the jurisdiction of the commune of N'Dali. According to the population census conducted by the Institut National de la Statistique Benin on February 15, 2002, the arrondissement had a total population of 5,757.
