= Kissamey =

Coordinates: 7.0333°N 1.7833°E

- Arrondissement
- Interactive map of Kissamey
- Country: Benin
- Department: Kouffo Department
- Commune: Aplahoué

Population (2002)
  - Total: 20,016
- Time zone: UTC+1 (WAT)

Kissamey is an arrondissement in the Kouffo department of Benin. It is an administrative division under the jurisdiction of the commune of Aplahoué. According to the population census conducted by the Institut National de la Statistique Benin on February 15, 2002, the arrondissement had a total population of 20,016.
