= Aholouyèmè =

Coordinates: 6°25′50″N 2°34′36″E

- Arrondissement
- Interactive map of Aholouyèmè
- Country: Benin
- Department: Ouémé Department
- Commune: Sèmè-Kpodji

Population (2002)
  - Total: 8,844
- Time zone: UTC+1 (WAT)

Aholouyèmè is an arrondissement in the Ouémé department of Benin. It is an administrative division under the jurisdiction of the commune of Sèmè-Kpodji. According to the population census conducted by the Institut National de la Statistique Benin on February 15, 2002, the arrondissement had a total population of 8,844.
