= Godohou =

Coordinates: 7°02′N 1°47′E

- Arrondissement
- Interactive map of Godohou
- Country: Benin
- Department: Kouffo Department
- Commune: Aplahoué

Population (2002)
  - Total: 12,259
- Time zone: UTC+1 (WAT)

Godohou is an arrondissement in the Kouffo department of Benin. It is an administrative division under the jurisdiction of the commune of Aplahoué. According to the population census conducted by the Institut National de la Statistique Benin on February 15, 2002, the arrondissement had a total population of 12,259.
