= Lobogo =

Coordinates: 6°38′N 1°54′E

- Arrondissement
- Interactive map of Lobogo
- Country: Benin
- Department: Mono Department
- Commune: Bopa

Population (2002)
  - Total: 17,622
- Time zone: UTC+1 (WAT)

Lobogo is an arrondissement in the Mono department of Benin. It is an administrative division under the jurisdiction of the commune of Bopa. According to the population census conducted by the Institut National de la Statistique Benin on February 15, 2002, the arrondissement had a total population of 17,622.

The name Lobogo is a place-name meaning "Under the orange tree" ("lobwe" = orange tree; "go" = under) in the local Sahue language. This is in reference to a woman who had set up a vendor stand under an orange tree. The market has grown to become one of the largest in the surrounding area. The market is known for its assortment of vodun-related ritual items and an impressive selection of goods brought from as far as Cotonou for sale. Market days occur once every five days with a significantly smaller selection of items available on non-market days. Non-textiles are often available only on a seasonal basis.
