= Djougou III =

Coordinates: 9°41′45″N 1°39′46″E

- Arrondissement
- Interactive map of Djougou III
- Country: Benin
- Department: Donga Department
- Commune: Djougou

Population (2002)
  - Total: 17,713
- Time zone: UTC+1 (WAT)

Djougou III is an arrondissement in the Donga department of Benin. It is an administrative division under the jurisdiction of the commune of Djougou. According to the population census conducted by the Institut National de la Statistique Benin on February 15, 2002, the arrondissement had a total population of 17,713.
