= Hounli =

Coordinates: 7.1665°N 1.9795°E

- Arrondissement
- Interactive map of Hounli
- Country: Benin
- Department: Zou Department
- Commune: Abomey

Population (2002)
  - Total: 16,590
- Time zone: UTC+1 (WAT)

Hounli is an arrondissement in the Zou department of Benin. It is an administrative division under the jurisdiction of the commune of Abomey. According to the population census conducted by the Institut National de la Statistique Benin on February 15, 2002, the arrondissement had a total population of 16,590.
