= Sazoué =

Coordinates: 6.3488°N 1.8065°E

- Arrondissement
- Interactive map of Sazoué
- Country: Benin
- Department: Mono Department
- Commune: Grand-Popo

Population (2002)
  - Total: 3,422
- Time zone: UTC+1 (WAT)

Sazoué is an arrondissement in the Mono department of Benin. It is an administrative division under the jurisdiction of the commune of Grand-Popo. According to the population census conducted by the Institut National de la Statistique Benin on February 15, 2002, the arrondissement had a total population of 3,422.
