= Dedomè =

Coordinates: 6.4620°N 2.0238°E

- Arrondissement and town
- Interactive map of Dedomè
- Country: Benin
- Department: Atlantique Department
- Commune: Kpomassè

Population (2002)
  - Total: 5,294
- Time zone: UTC+1 (WAT)

Dedomè is a town and arrondissement in the Atlantique Department of southern Benin. It is an administrative division under the jurisdiction of the commune of Kpomassè. According to the population census conducted by the Institut National de la Statistique Benin on February 15, 2002, the arrondissement had a total population of 5,294.
