= Assalin =

Coordinates: 7.2271°N 2.1957°E

- Arrondissement
- Interactive map of Assalin
- Country: Benin
- Department: Zou Department
- Commune: Za-Kpota

Population (2002)
  - Total: 8,371
- Time zone: UTC+1 (WAT)

Assalin is an arrondissement in the Zou department of Benin. It is an administrative division under the jurisdiction of the commune of Za-Kpota. According to the population census conducted by the Institut National de la Statistique Benin on February 15, 2002, the arrondissement had a total population of 8,371.
