= Dekpo =

Coordinates: 7°10′55″N 1°42′09″E

- Arrondissement
- Interactive map of Dekpo
- Country: Benin
- Department: Kouffo Department
- Commune: Aplahoué

Population (2002)
  - Total: 16,390
- Time zone: UTC+1 (WAT)

Dekpo is an arrondissement, an administrative division, in the Kouffo department of Benin under the jurisdiction of the commune of Aplahoué. According to the population census conducted by the Institut National de la Statistique Benin on February 15, 2002, the arrondissement had a total population of 16,390.
