= Dassa II =

Coordinates: 7°47′12″N 2°11′03″E

- Arrondissement
- Interactive map of Dassa II
- Country: Benin
- Department: Collines Department
- Commune: Dassa-Zoumé

Population (2002)
  - Total: 14,667
- Time zone: UTC+1 (WAT)

Dassa II is an arrondissement in the Collines department of Benin. It is an administrative division under the jurisdiction of the commune of Dassa-Zoumé. According to the population census conducted by the Institut National de la Statistique Benin on February 15, 2002, the arrondissement had a total population of 14,667.
