= Ouidah I =

Coordinates: 6.3667°N 2.0833°E

- Arrondissement
- Interactive map of Ouidah I
- Country: Benin
- Department: Atlantique Department
- Commune: Ouidah

Population (2002)
  - Total: 8,188
- Time zone: UTC+1 (WAT)

Ouidah I is an arrondissement in the Atlantique Department of southern Benin. It is an administrative division under the jurisdiction of the commune of Ouidah. According to the population census conducted by the Institut National de la Statistique Benin on February 15, 2002, the arrondissement had a total population of 8,188.
