= Djougou II =

Coordinates: 9.7113°N 1.8002°E

- Arrondissement
- Interactive map of Djougou II
- Country: Benin
- Department: Donga Department
- Commune: Djougou

Population (2002)
  - Total: 18,579
- Time zone: UTC+1 (WAT)

Djougou II is an arrondissement in the Donga department of Benin. It is an administrative division under the jurisdiction of the commune of Djougou. According to the population census conducted by the Institut National de la Statistique Benin on February 15, 2002, the arrondissement had a total population of 18,579.
