= Sèkèrè =

Coordinates: 10°27′N 2°27′E

- Arrondissement and town
- Interactive map of Sèkèrè
- Country: Benin
- Department: Borgou Department
- Commune: Sinendé

Population (2002)
  - Total: 14,314
- Time zone: UTC+1 (WAT)

Sèkèrè or Sèrèkè is a town and arrondissement in the Borgou Department of Benin. It is an administrative division under the jurisdiction of the commune of Sinendé. According to the population census conducted by the Institut National de la Statistique Benin on February 15, 2002, the arrondissement had a total population of 14,314.
