= Lake Ahémé =

Lake in Benin

- Lac Ahémé (French)
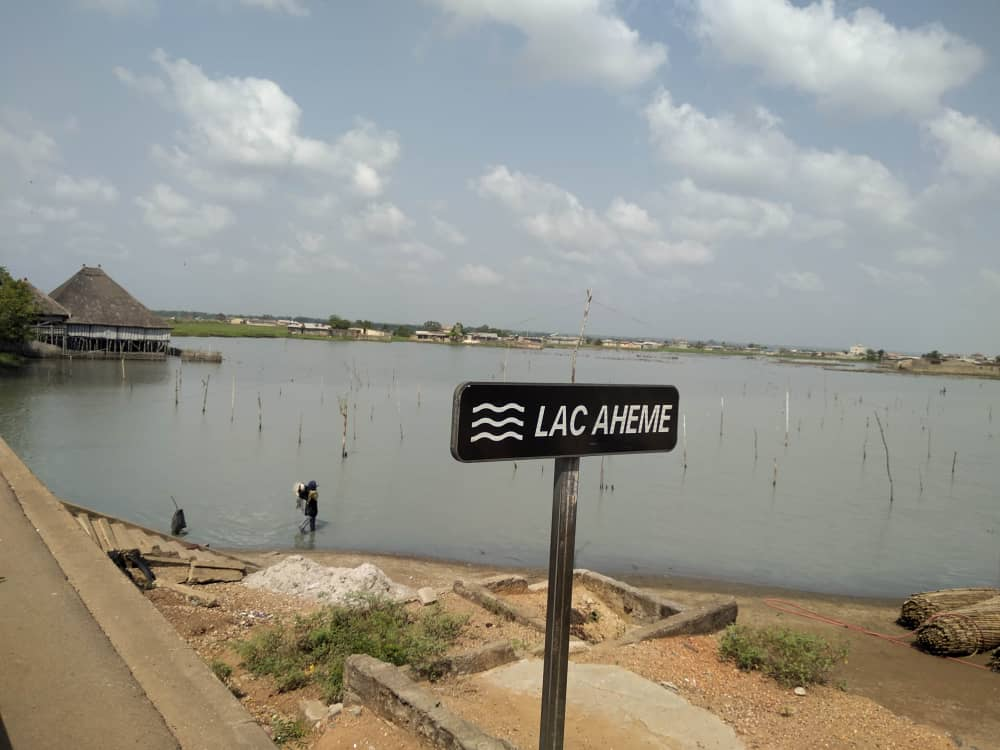
- Lake Ahémé

- Location within Benin
- Location: southwestern Benin
- Coordinates: 6.495°N 1.975°E
- Primary inflows: Couffo River
- Primary outflows: Aho Channel
- Basin countries: Benin
- Max. length: 24 km (15 mi)
- Max. width: 5.5 km (3.4 mi)
- Surface area: 78–100 km^{2} (30–39 sq mi)
- Surface elevation: 3–5 m (9.8–16.4 ft)
- Settlements: Agatogbo, Agbanto, Akodéha, Bopa, Dekanmè, Kpomassè, Possotomè, Tokpa-Domè

Lake Ahémé is Benin's second largest lake, with an area of 78 square kilometres (30 sq mi) in the dry season which expands to 100 square kilometres (39 sq mi) in the rainy season. The lake is 24 kilometres (15 mi) long and has an average width of 3.6 kilometres (2.2 mi). The Couffo River drains into the swampy north end of the lake, while the 10 km-long Aho Channel connects the lake's southern end to the Grand-Popo Lagoon on the Atlantic coast. This channel flows south during the wet season but reverses direction in the dry season, which causes the salinity of the lake's southern end to increase.

The Pedah and the Ayizo are the two main ethnic groups living on the shores of Lake Ahémé. Fishing and agriculture are the main economic activities in the area. In the lake, 71 species of fish have been recorded.

The 47,500 hectares (117,000 acres) comprising the marshes of the lower Couffo, Lake Ahémé, the Aho Channel and the adjoining coastal lagoon have been designated as a Ramsar site and an Important Bird Area.
