= Octave Houdégbé =

Beninese politician (1945–2025)

Member of the National Assembly of Benin
- In office May 2015 – May 2023

Personal details
- Born: 28 November 1945 Dekanmè, French Dahomey
- Died: 9 December 2025 (aged 80) Kpomassè, Benin
- Party: BR
- Occupation: Academic

Octave Houdégbé (28 November 1945 – 9 December 2025) was a Beninese politician of the Republican Bloc (BR).

As an academic, he founded a private university, the Houdegbe North American University Benin.

== Life and career ==
Born in Dekanmè on 28 November 1945, Houdégbé served as Secretary of State for Relations with the High Commission for Planning from 1983 to 1990. From 1990 to 1992, he was Deputy Secretary of State to the Ministry of Energy, Mines, and Water Resources and subsequently Minister-Counselor to the President for the Economy and Finances.

In 2015, Houdégbé was elected to the National Assembly and supported Adrien Houngbédji as president of the National Assembly. He was re-elected in 2019.

== Death ==
Houdégbé died in Kpomassè on 9 December 2025, at the age of 80.
