= Chito =

Chito is a given name or nickname that may refer to:

- Chito Calvo (1903–1977), Filipino basketball player, swimmer, and coach
- Chito Garcia (1924–2015), Mexican baseball outfielder and manager
- Chito Gascon, Filipino lawyer, civil organizer, and human-rights activist
- Chito Jaime (born 1983), Filipino professional basketball player
- Chito Latamblé (1916–1993), Cuban tres player who specialized in the changüí genre of eastern Cuba
- Chito Loyzaga (born 1958), Filipino former basketball player and basketball commissioner
- Chito Martínez (1965–2025), the first player in the history of Major League Baseball to be born in the country of Belize
- Chito Martínez (footballer) (born 1977), Venezuelan footballer
- Chito Miranda (born 1976), Filipino singer-songwriter and lead singer for the band Parokya ni Edgar
- Chito Narvasa (born 1956), Filipino business executive and former basketball player and coach
- Chito Santa Romana (1948–2022), Philippine journalist and diplomat
- Chito S. Roño (born 1954), Filipino writer, producer, and director
- Chito Salud (born 1962), Filipino lawyer and sports executive
- Chito Soganub (1960–2020), Filipino Roman Catholic priest based in Marawi
- Chito Tagle (born 1957), Filipino cardinal of the Catholic Church
- Chito Victolero (born 1975), former Filipino professional basketball player and current coach

== See also ==
- Chito-ryu (千唐流), a style of karate founded by Dr. Tsuyoshi Chitose, (1898–1984)
- Chito Branch Reserve, in southeastern Hillsborough County, Florida, US
- Chitō Station, railway station formerly located in Chiebun (智恵文), Nayoro Hokkaidō, Japan
- Cito (disambiguation)
- Shetou, rural township in Changhua County, Taiwan
- Shito, hot black pepper sauce in Ghanaian cuisine
- Tchito, arrondissement in the Kouffo department of Benin
- Chi Tau, small national men's fraternity in the United States
- Cheetos, a snack food
