= Honhoué =

Coordinates: 6°31′41″N 1°51′54″E

- Arrondissement
- Interactive map of Honhoué
- Country: Benin
- Department: Mono Department
- Commune: Houéyogbé

Population (2002)
  - Total: 4,648
- Time zone: UTC+1 (WAT)

Honhoué is an arrondissement in the Mono department of Benin. It is an administrative division under the jurisdiction of the commune of Houéyogbé. According to the population census conducted by the Institut National de la Statistique Benin on February 15, 2002, the arrondissement had a total population of 4648.
