= Banigbé, Donga =

Coordinates: 6.8673°N 1.9788°E

Banigbé
- Arrondissement
- Interactive map of Banigbé
- Country: Benin
- Department: Kouffo Department
- Commune: Lalo

Population (2002)
  - Total: 5,027
- Time zone: UTC+1 (WAT)

Banigbé is an arrondissement in the Kouffo department of Benin. It is an administrative division under the jurisdiction of the commune of Lalo. According to the population census conducted by the Institut National de la Statistique Benin on February 15, 2002, the arrondissement had a total population of 5,027.
