= Adjanhonmè =

Coordinates: 7.0618°N 1.8368°E

- Arrondissement
- Interactive map of Adjanhonmè
- Country: Benin
- Department: Kouffo Department
- Commune: Klouékanmè

Population (2002)
  - Total: 16,421
- Time zone: UTC+1 (WAT)

Adjanhonmè is an arrondissement in the Kouffo department of Benin. It is an administrative division under the jurisdiction of the commune of Klouékanmè. According to the population census conducted by the Institut National de la Statistique Benin on February 15, 2002, the arrondissement had a total population of 16,421.
