= Sè, Mono =

Coordinates: 6°39′39″N 1°45′14″E

Sè
- Arrondissement
- Interactive map of Sè
- Country: Benin
- Department: Mono Department
- Commune: Houéyogbé

Population (2013)
  - Total: 26,627
- Time zone: UTC+1 (WAT)

Sè is an arrondissement in the Mono department of Benin. It is an administrative division under the jurisdiction of the commune of Houéyogbé. According to the population census conducted by the Institut National de la Statistique Benin on May 11, 2013, the arrondissement had a total population of 26,627. The town is a noted centre of pottery production.
