= Jean Paul Amoussou =

Beninese actor

- Born: Jean Paul Amoussou; 1970 (age 55–56); Treichville, Benin
- Other names: Oncle Bazar
- Occupations: actor, comedian, director, producer, video director, screenwriter
- Years active: 1989–present

Jean Paul Amoussou (born 1970), popularly known by his stage name Oncle Bazar, is a Beninese actor, comedian, director, producer, video director and screenwriter.

== Personal life ==
He was born in 1970 in Treichville, Benin.

In 2017, he was a victim of a robbery on the night of 3 June 2017 in Grand-Popo in the Mono department, where the crime was committed by a police officer on duty in Lokossa and a soldier on duty at the Grand-Popo Naval Base.

== Career ==
During his life in the elementary school, he joined the school theater troupe and performed many times. He later won many prizes for these school dramas. After entering the high school, he met Justin Avolonto, then Director of the CSP, Protestant Secondary Course. Under Avolonto's guidance, Amoussou developed his acting skills by participating to many artistic and cultural activities of the high school. Then he met late Professor Momby. With several popular stage plays and television serials, he became a sensation in the African artistic and cultural arena under the name of "Oncle Bazar".

Later he founded the company "Oncle Bazar Productions" and worked with notable personalities such as the late Gbomagniavoko, Prince Yadjo. Meanwhile, he started to produce audio cassette productions such as "Le Doute Du Président" and "Trouble D'Amour". In 1999, the company made the first audiovisual production in VCD titled Petit Pipi. At that time, the VCD was a first in the Benin media history. After huge public interest, the company started many national productions such as Agbako (2004), Assougbo (2006), Gbèto dida (2007). In 2008, it was followed by the famous police series Djibiti, Volume 1 and 2, which later became an international success. In 2009, he made the serial Houédjizo (The house on fire).

In 2003 Amoussou achieved the rank of Knight of the Order of Merit of Benin. Then in 2004, he was recognized as the Best Artist of the Year. In 2010, he produced the film The Black Hand which was selected for the Khourigha African Film Festival in Morocco. Later in 2011, his film Houedjizo was selected by the same Festival as well as represented the Pan-African Film Festival of Ouagadougou (Fespaco) 2011. His 3 other films: Djibiti, La Main noire and Houédjizo were selected at the Rencontres audiovisuelles de Douala (Rado), Cameroon. The film Djibiti sold nearly forty thousand copies of VCD (Video CD). With the commercial success, the second part of the film Djibiti 2 was released in November 2008 with estimated at 16 million CFA francs. In 2014, he made the Tv movies Mon invité and Mon ménage.

== Filmography ==
Year	Film	Role	Genre	Ref.
2008	Djibiti	actor	Film	
2008	Djibiti 2	actor	Film	
2010	Main noire (La)	director	Film	
2010	Main noire II (La)	director	Film	
2011	Calebasse (La)	director	Film	
2016	Mon invité	director	Film	
