= Amoussou =

Amoussou is a surname. Notable people with the surname include:

- Bertrand Amoussou-Guenou (born 1966), French mixed martial artist
- Bruno Amoussou (born 1939), Beninese politician
- Jean Paul Amoussou (born 1970), Beninese actor
- Karl Amoussou (born 1985), French-German mixed martial artist
- Ralph Amoussou (born 1989), French actor
- Sylvestre Amoussou (born 1964), Beninese actor
- Valère Amoussou (born 1987), Beninese footballer
