= Djanglanmey =

Coordinates: 6.3488°N 1.8065°E

- Arrondissement
- Interactive map of Djanglanmey
- Country: Benin
- Department: Mono Department
- Commune: Grand-Popo

Population (2002)
  - Total: 5,200
- Time zone: UTC+1 (WAT)

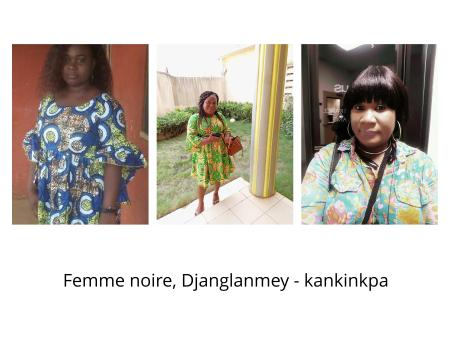
Three women of Djanglanmey

Djanglanmey is an arrondissement in the Mono department of Benin. It is an administrative division under the jurisdiction of the commune of Grand-Popo. According to the population census conducted by the Institut National de la Statistique Benin on February 15, 2002, the arrondissement had a total population of 5200. Djanglanmey is an old kingdom in west Africa and a commercial jonction in Grand-popo. This foundation was ruled by Gbokpoe Komavo. The princes and princesses are living in others countries. The traditional celebration in this town is kotafon. Before the arrival of Europeans Djanglanmey people are worshiping idols or vaudou. Now the area turn to jesus Christ by the evangelism, and the message of Christ touch so many villages in west Bénin. Djanglanmey was in the slave trade with Europeans because of the traditional priests and warriors who are active in this trade. Their traditional language is Kotafon.
