= Agatogbo =

Coordinates: 6°24′N 1°54′E

- Arrondissement
- Interactive map of Agatogbo
- Country: Benin
- Department: Mono Department
- Commune: Comè

Population (2002)
  - Total: 9,758
- Time zone: UTC+1 (WAT)

Agatogbo is an arrondissement in the Mono department of Benin. It is an administrative division under the jurisdiction of the commune of Comè. According to the population census conducted by the Institut National de la Statistique Benin on February 15, 2002, the arrondissement had a total population of 9,758.
