= Banigbé =

Banigbé may refer to several places in Benin:

- Banigbé, Donga
- Banigbé, Plateau
