= Villa Karo =

Finnish-African culture center in Benin

Coordinates: 6.2789°N 1.8255°E

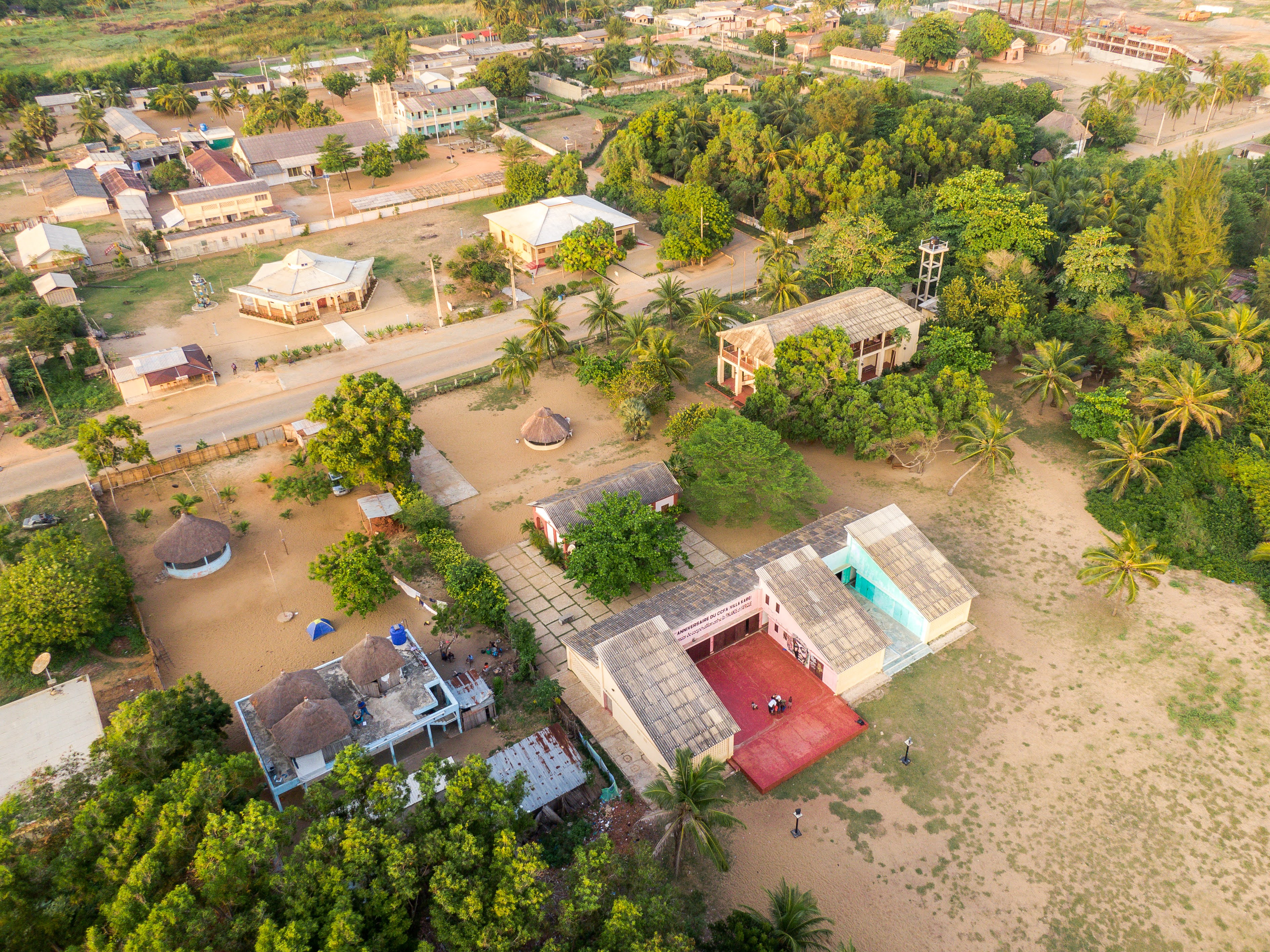
Villa Karo viewed from the ocean. Front right community center Lissa Gbassa, then Petit musée, two-storey Villa Karo main building, Musée Karo and Researach center to the right.

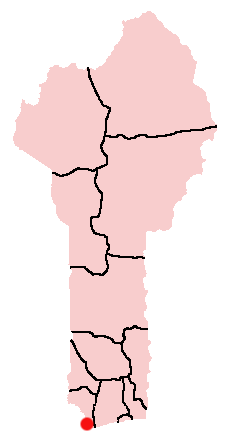
Location of Grand-Popo on the Coast of Benin, the Gulf of Guinea.

Villa Karo is a Finnish-African culture center and artist residence in the coastal village of Grand-Popo, Benin. Its purpose is to build a bridge between Finnish and African artists and cultural figures. The primary task is to offer Finnish artists, researchers, teachers, and other professionals in cultural and social fields an opportunity to reside in Africa. In addition, African professionals in culture are encouraged to visit Finland.

Application for residency are accepted twice a year. The fall residencies applications are due on 15 March, and the spring residencies applications are due on 15 September.

== History ==
When writer Juha Vakkuri travelled in the region in the 1990s, he conceived the idea of establishing a cultural center in Grand-Popo. He set up a non-profit organization to promote the idea. Vakkuri named the center Villa Karo in honour of his deceased son Karo.

The hearth of the center is a colonial, Afro-Brazilian style old hospital renovated into the main building. It was opened in 2000. The site was selected because Grand-Popo, a tranquil fishing village, offers a good set for creating. Benin is one of the most stable and democratic countries in the continent.

== Activity ==
Villa Karo offers the following free cultural services for local people and visitors.

=== Musée Karo ===
A small museum was opened in 2001, where art and objects related to West African culture and Animist religion are displayed. The museum collection reflects both influences of European culture in Africa, understanding of Europeans of Africa, and reflections of African culture in Europe.

A new museum, Musée Karo, was opened in 2015 in the former bank of the village.

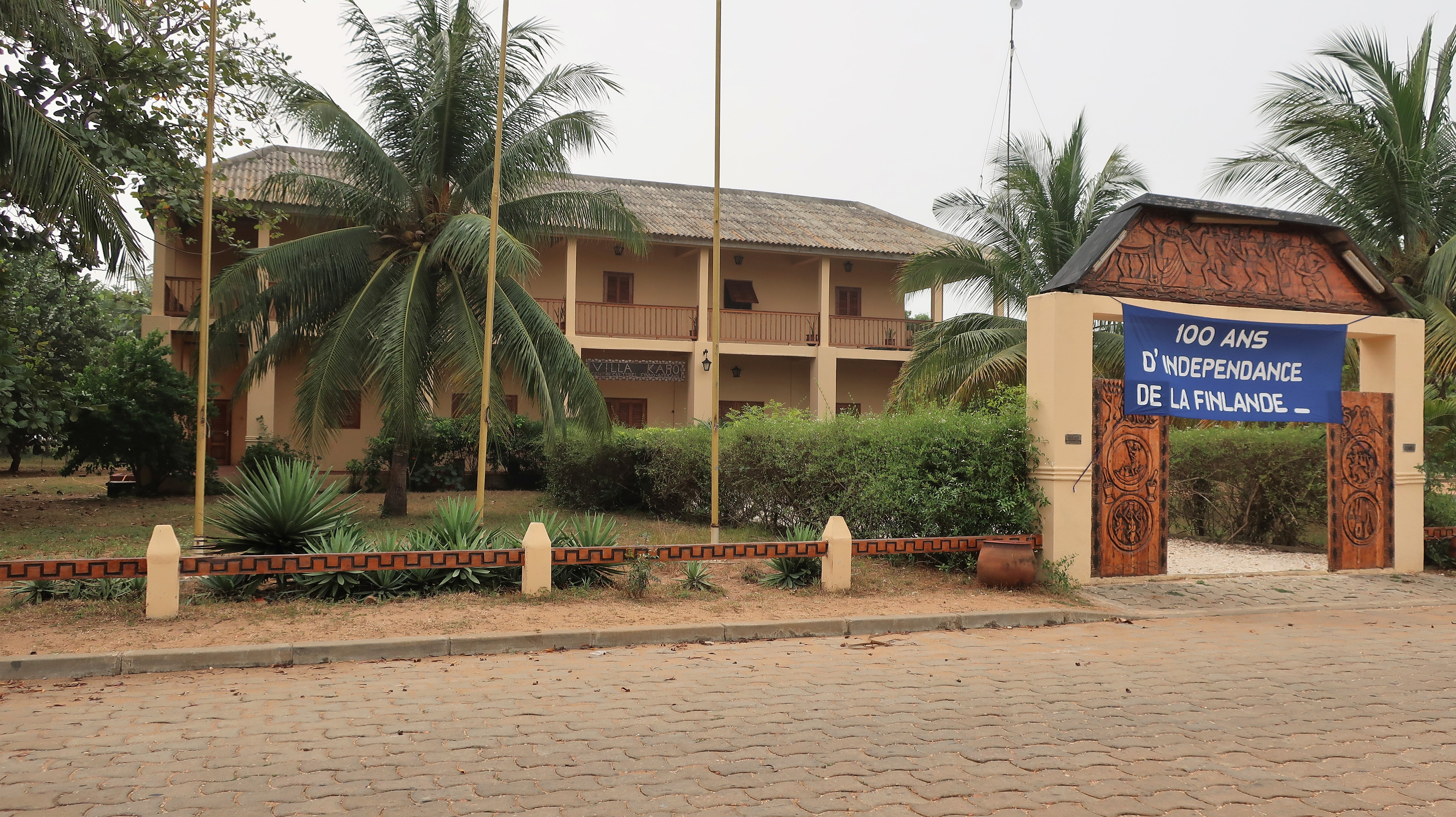
Villa Karo residence main building in December 2017.

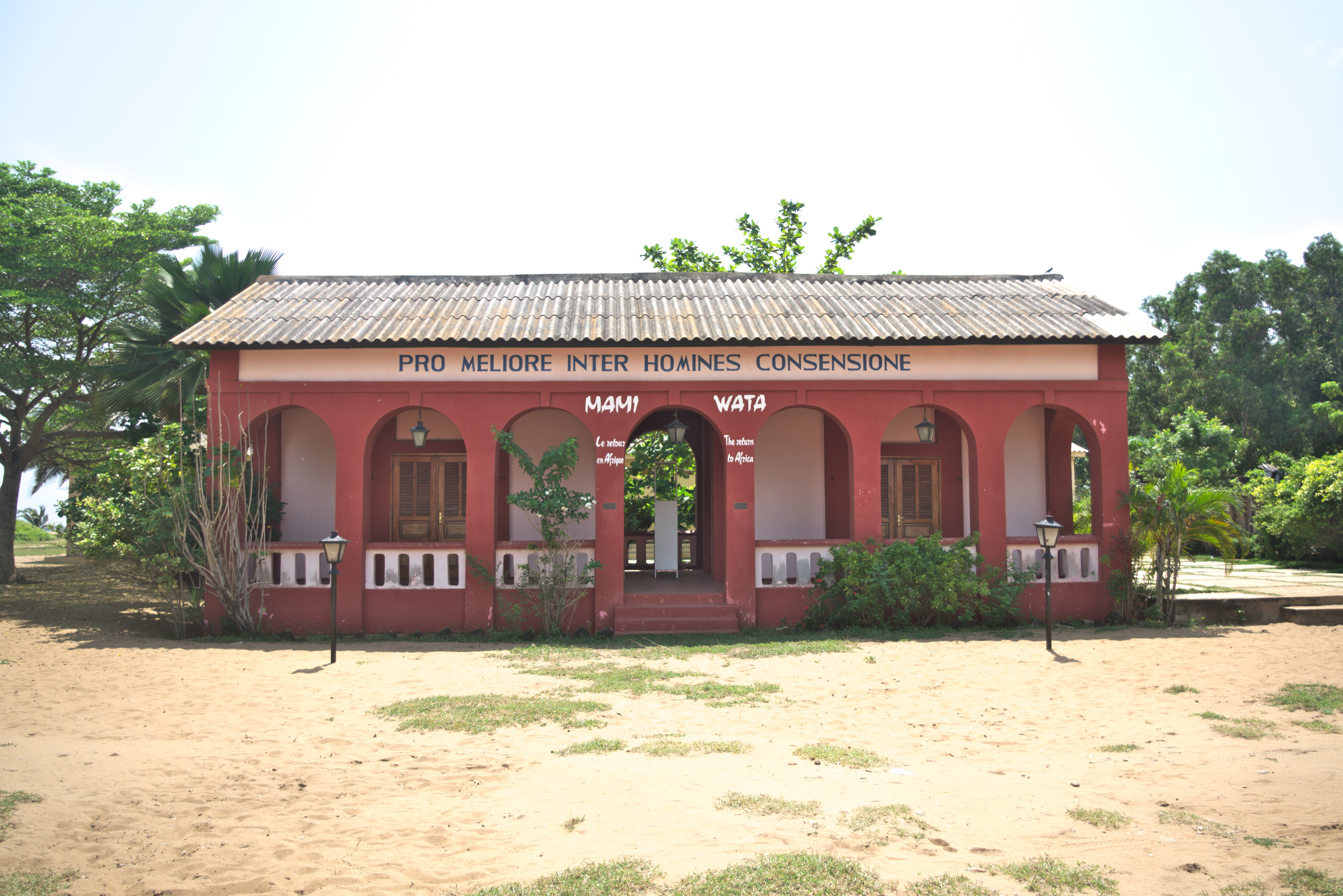
Petit musée

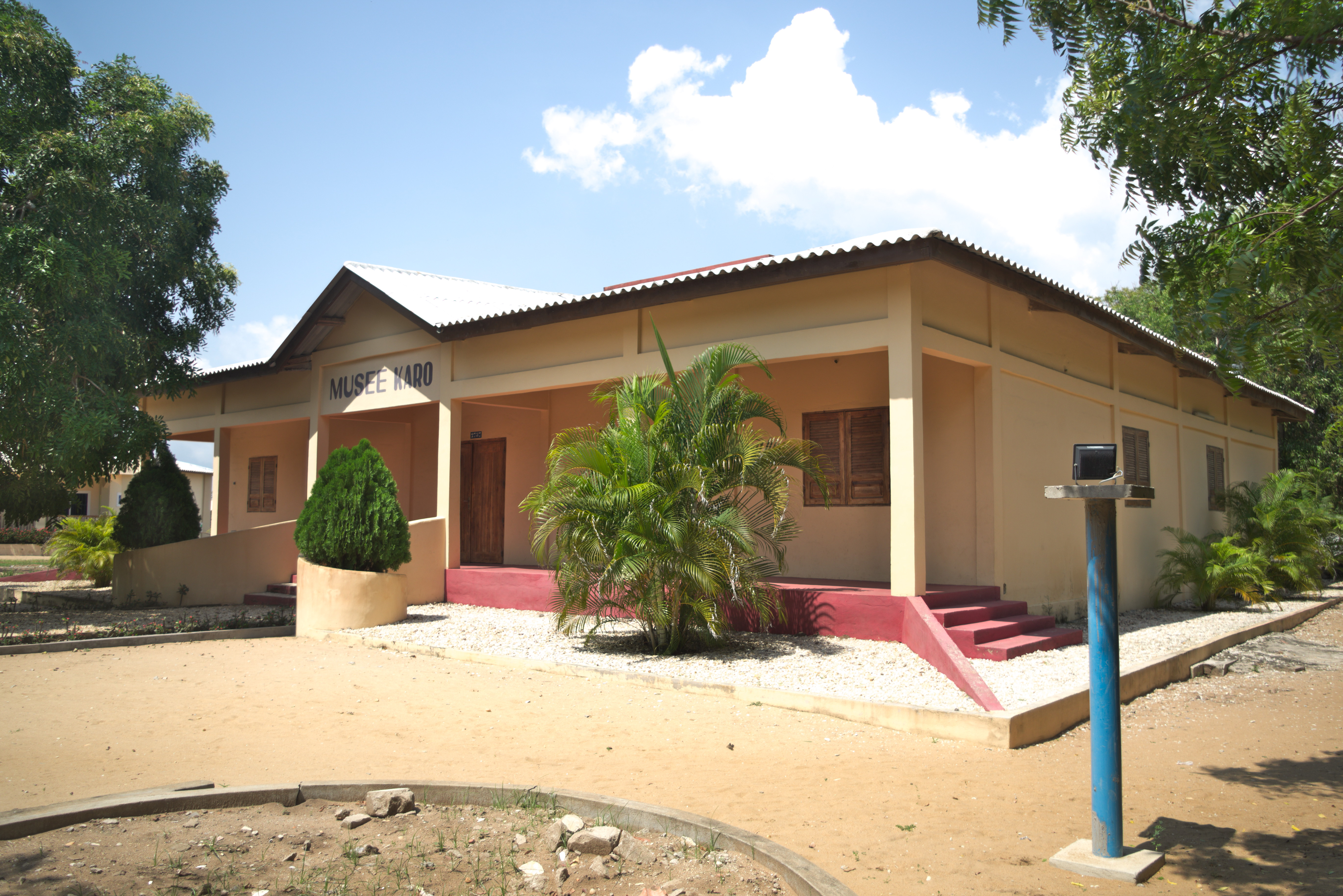
Musée Karo

=== Community centre ===
In 2003, a new multi-purpose space, Lissa Gbassa, was opened. It serves as a space for exhibitions, meetings, an outside movie theater, and a performance stage for monthly concerts and performances.

=== Library ===
There is a public library in Villa Karo, which includes about 3,000 volumes of literature in Finnish, French, English, and Swedish.

=== Artist's residence ===
For the scholars, the center offers five rooms that function both as living and working spaces.

About 800 artists and cultural researchers have spent their time in the center. In addition, about 2,000 people from Finland, from university students to President Tarja Halonen, have visited Villa Karo.

The center is financed by the Finnish Ministry of Education and Culture, private sponsors, and donors. Villa Karo has advocacy members, such as Aalto University, Sibelius Academy, Helsinki Theatre Academy, Åbo Akademi University, University of Turku, Ornamo Art and Design Finland, the Society of Finnish Composers, the Society of Swedish Authors in Finland, and the Finnish Playwrights and Screenwriters Guild.

== Photos ==
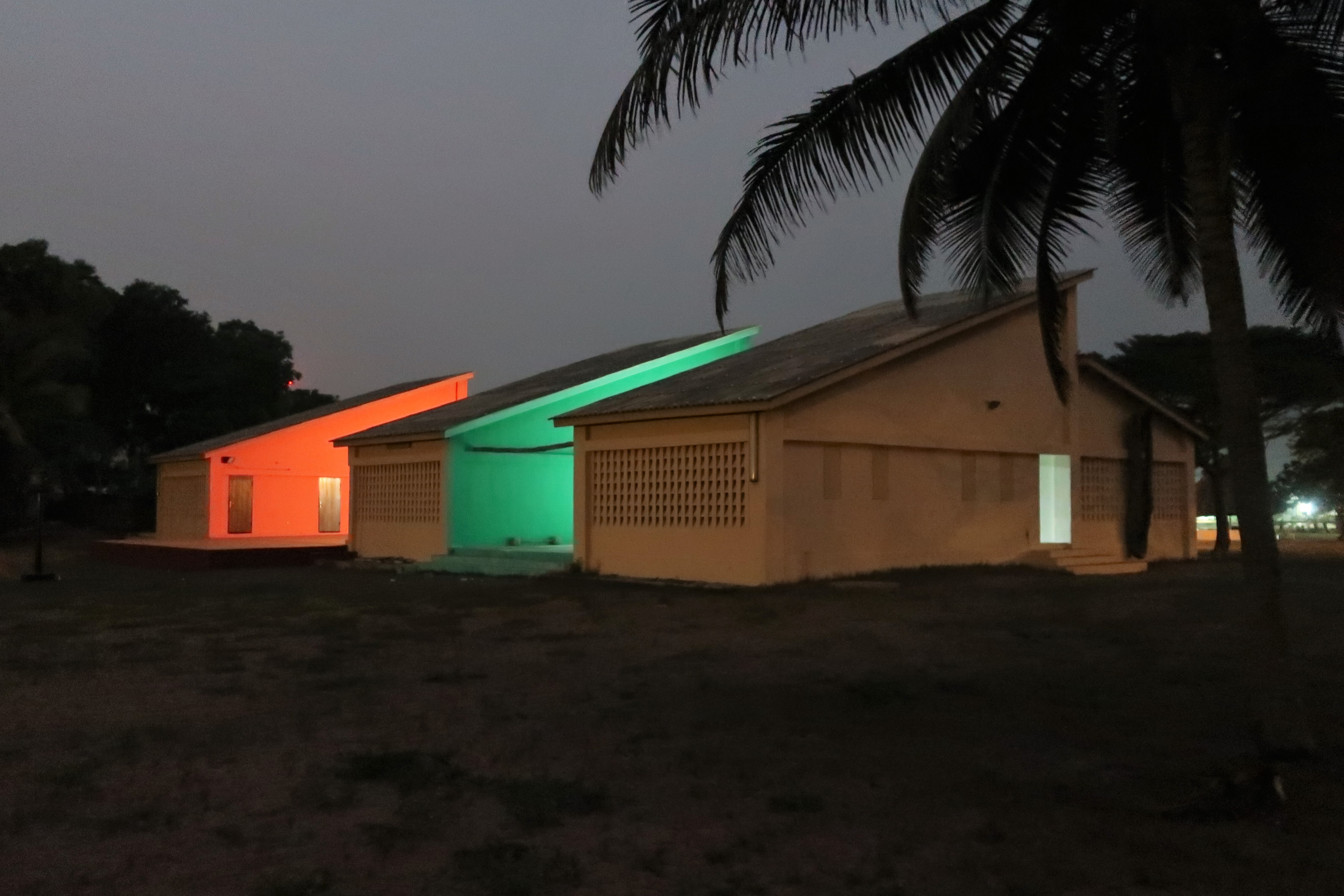
Community center at night.

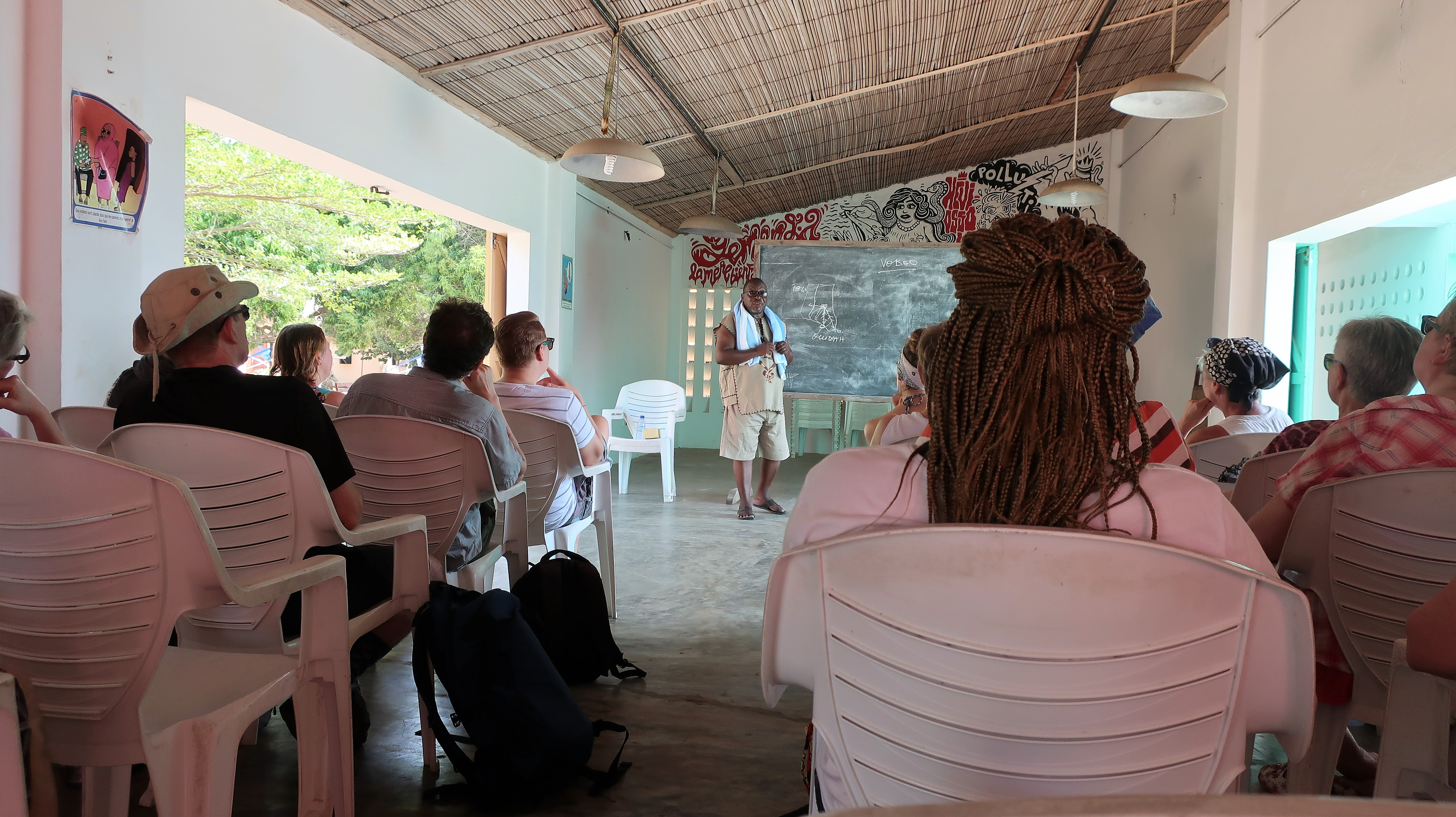
Director of Villa Karo Mr Kwassi Akpladokou giving a lecture to the visitors.

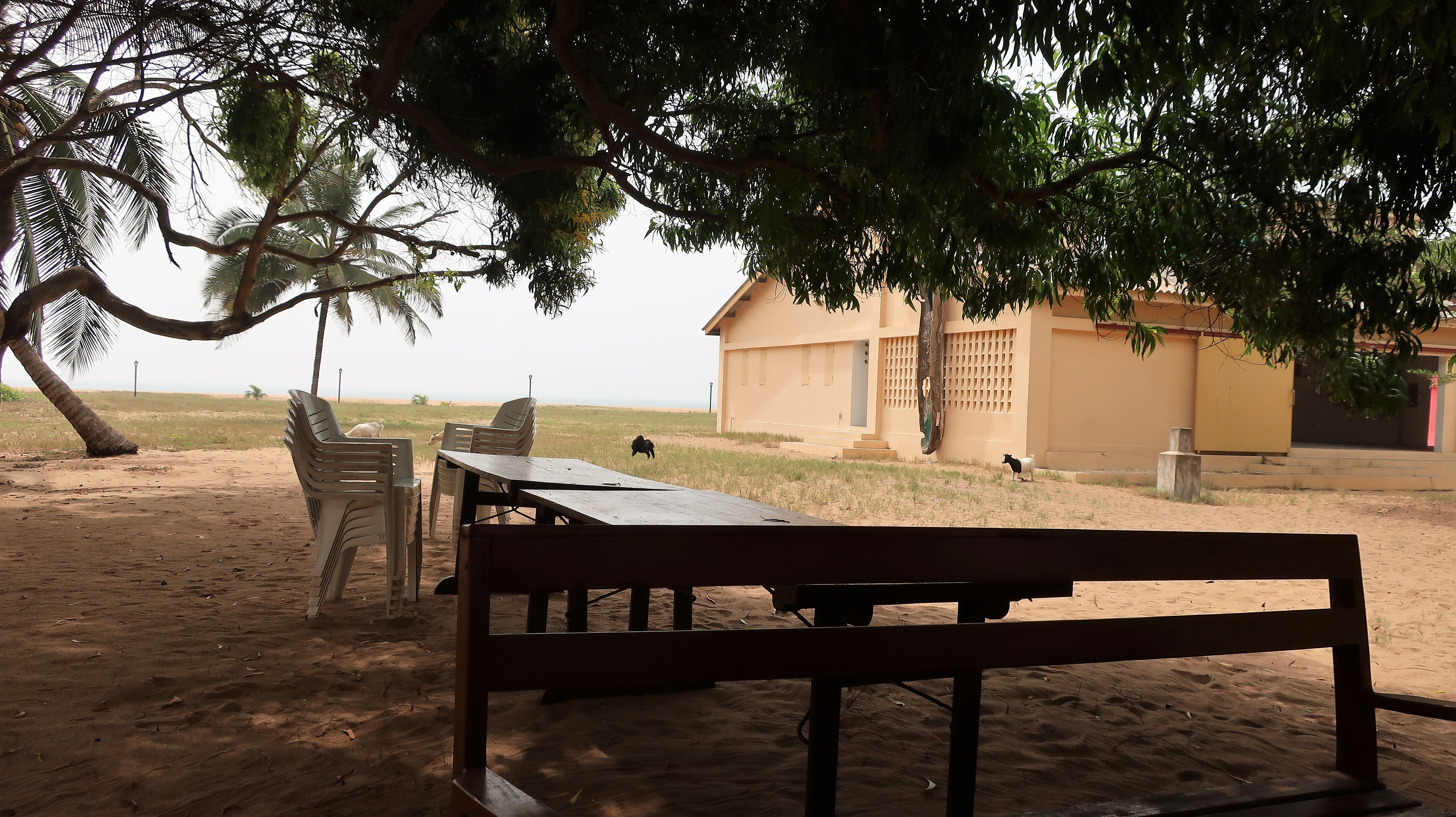
View to the ocean from Villa Karo.

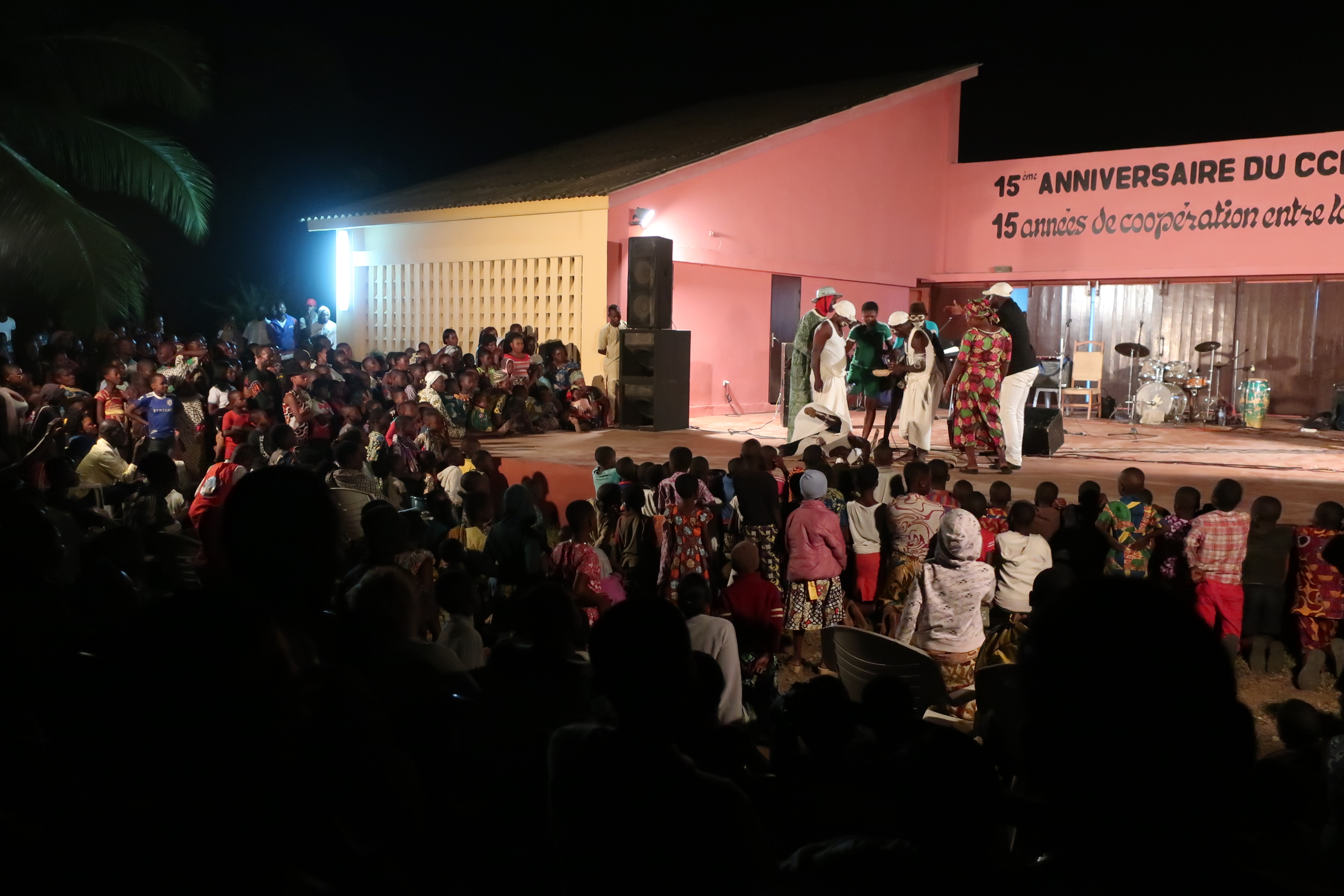
Night concert in Villa Karo.

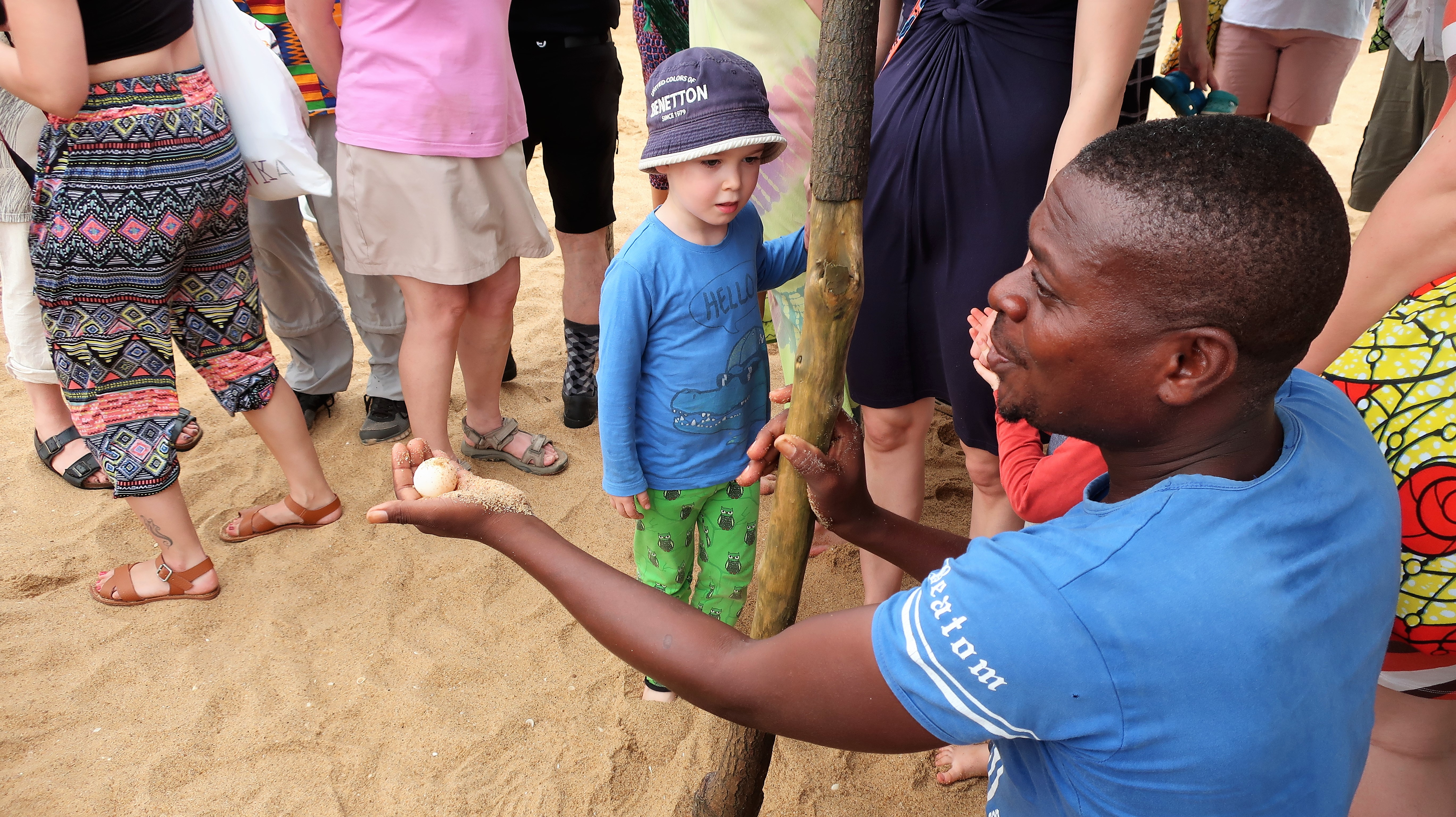
At the Turtle Station in Grand-Popo.

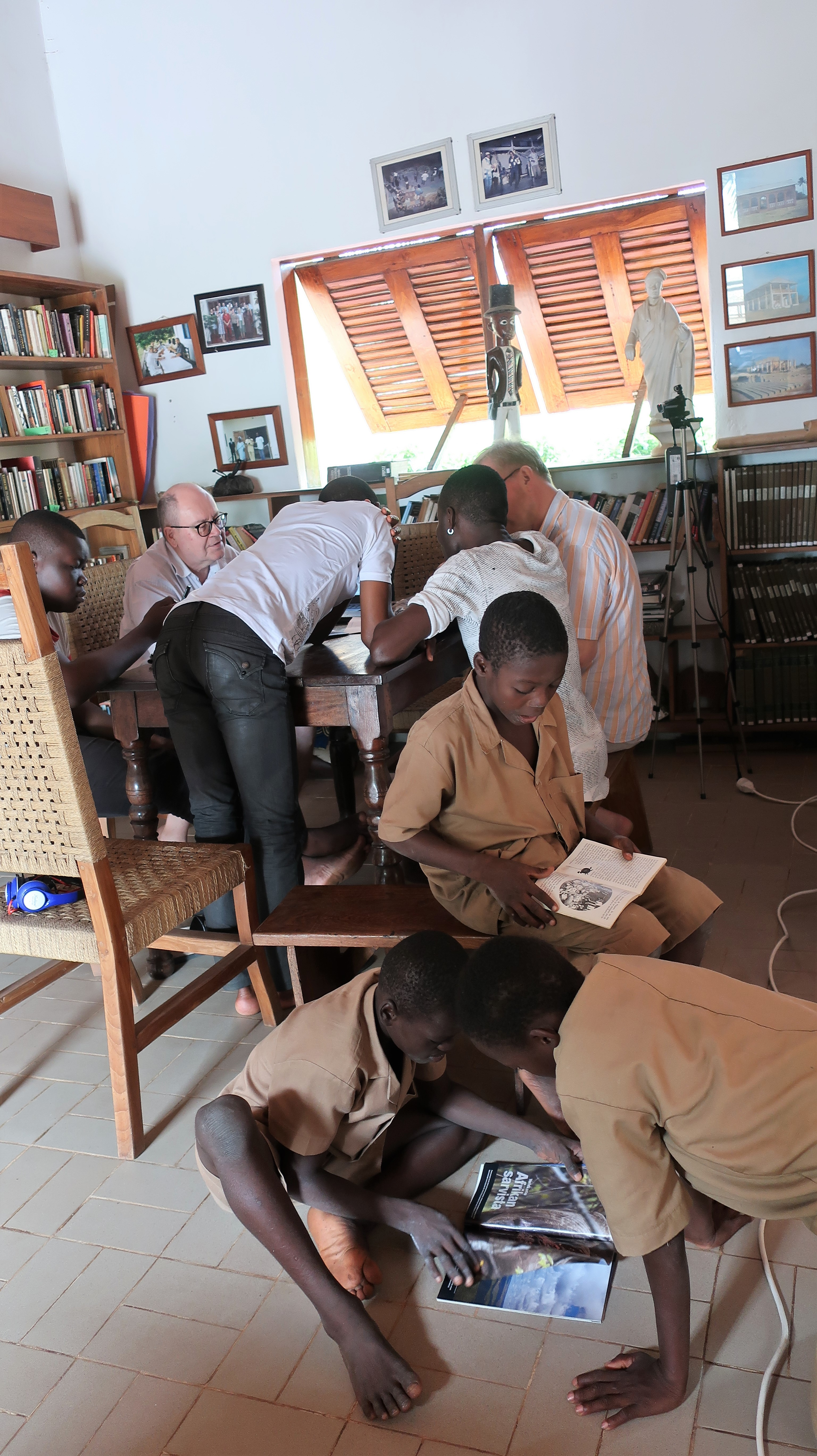
Customers in Villa Karo library.

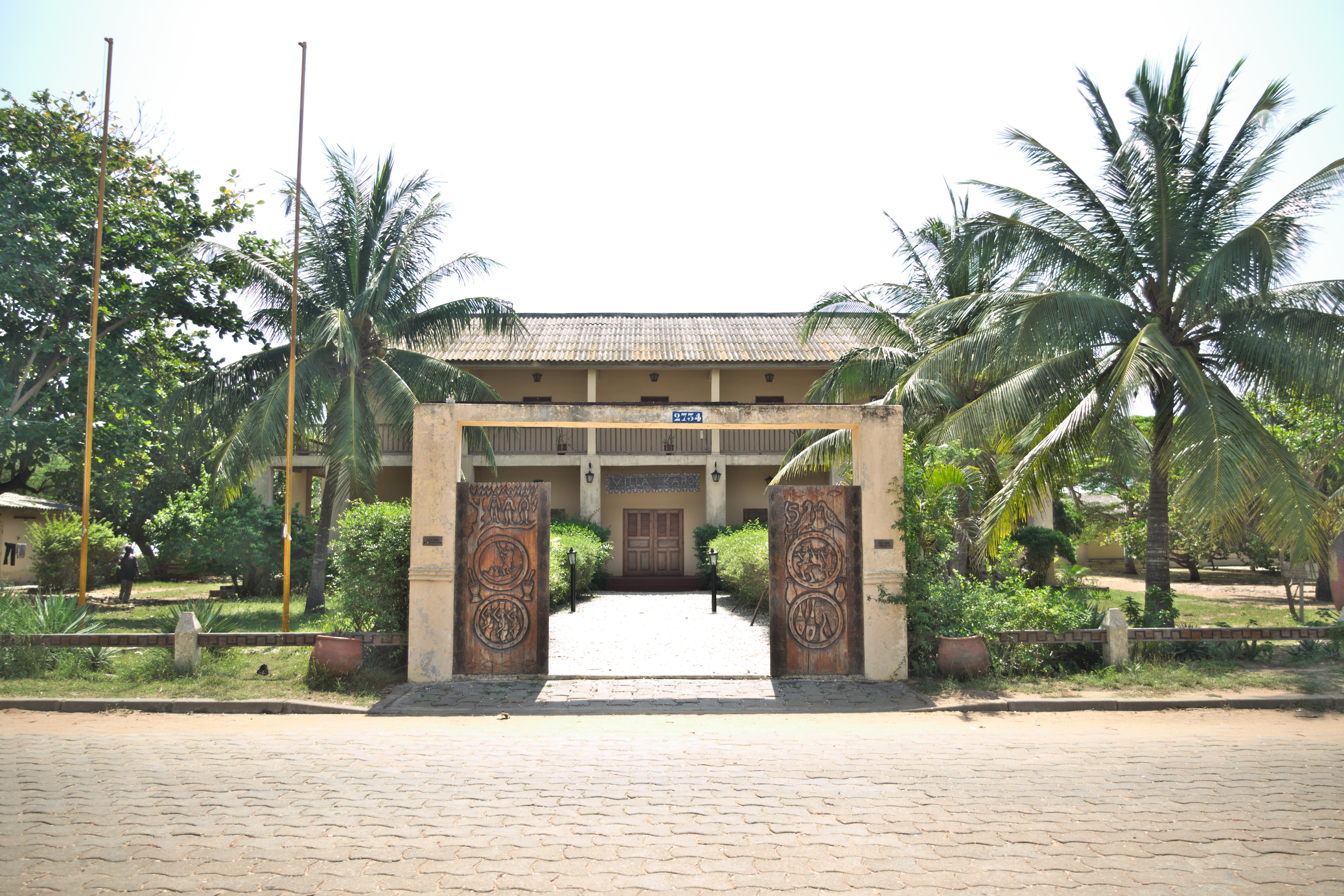
Entrance of Villa Karo.

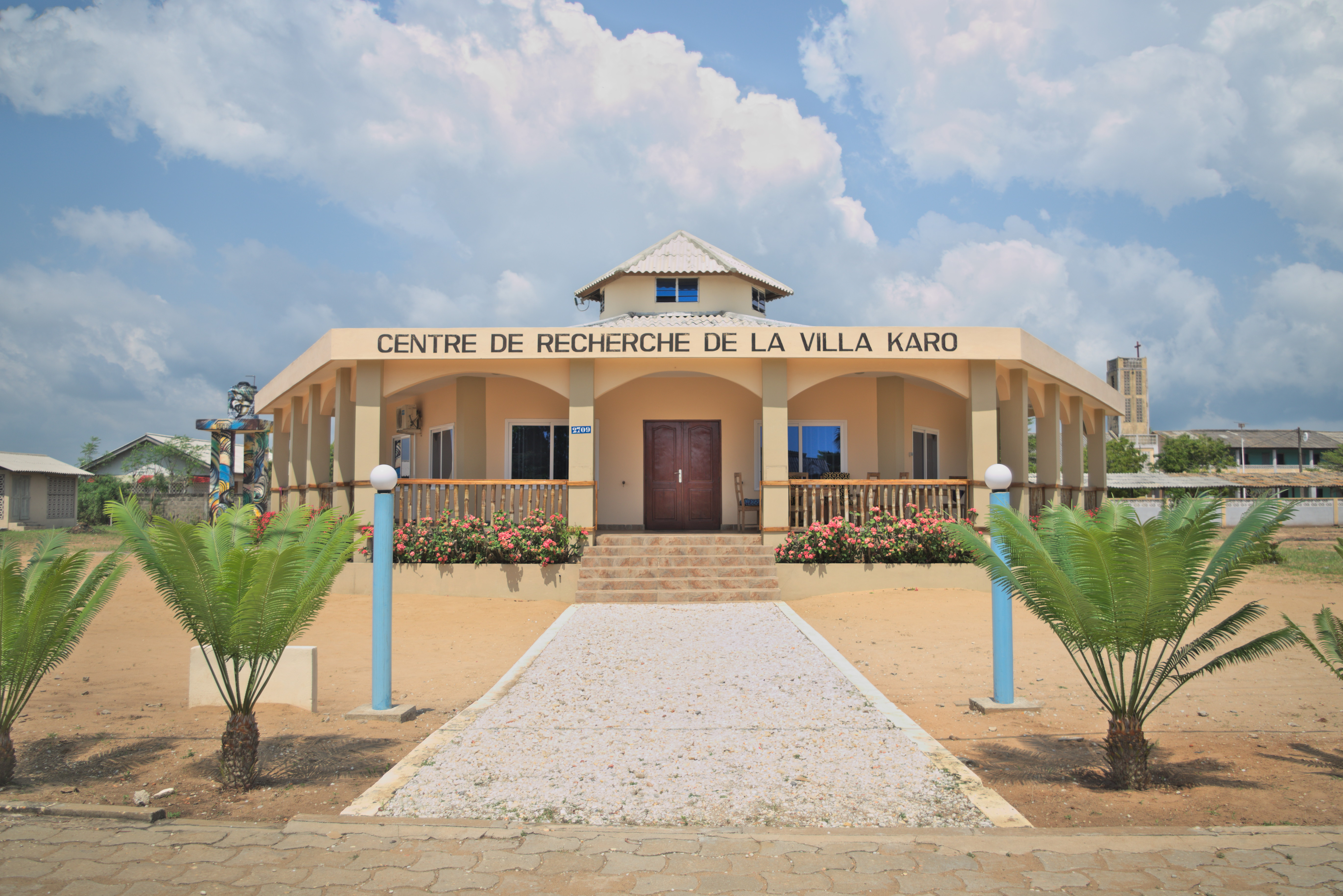
Research center of Villa Karo.
