= Djakotomey =

- Commune and city
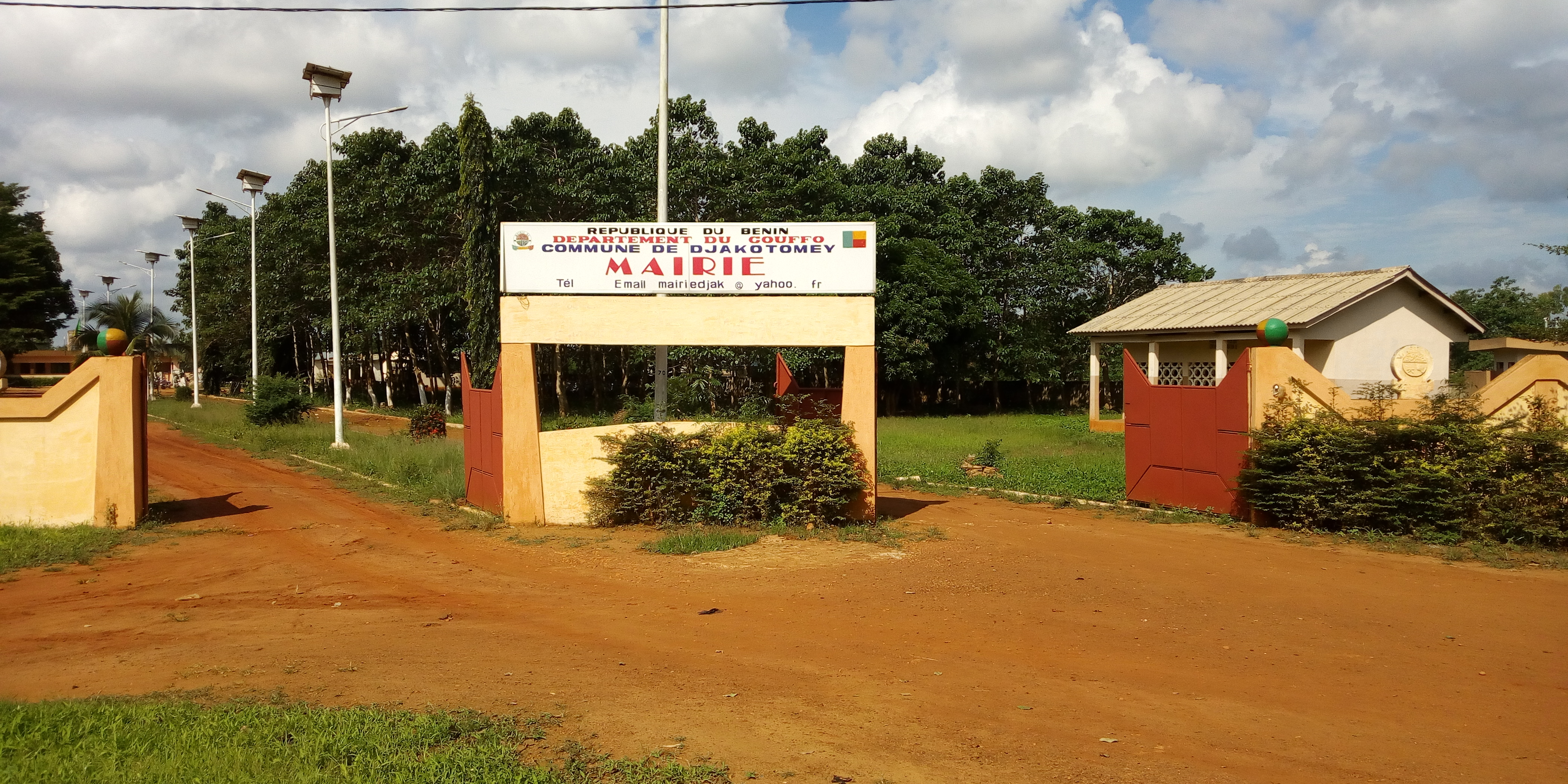
- Djakotomey Town Hall

- Location in Benin
- Coordinates: 6°54′N 1°43′E
- Country: Benin
- Department: Kouffo Department

Area
  - Total: 125 sq mi (325 km^{2})

Population (2013)
  - Total: 134,704
  - Density: 1,072.7/sq mi (414.17/km^{2})
- Time zone: UTC+1 (WAT)

Djakotomey [dʒa.kɔ.tɔ.mɛ] is a town and commune in the Kouffo Department of south-western Benin. The commune covers an area of 325 square kilometers and as of 2013 had a population of 134,704 people.
