= Klouékanmè =

- Commune and city
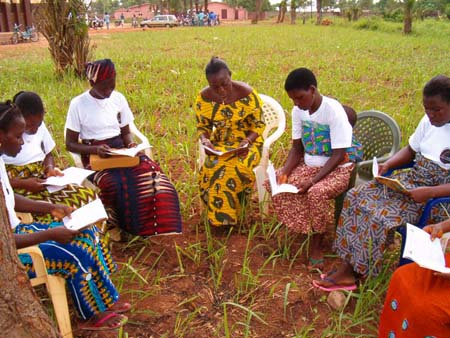

- Location in Benin
- Coordinates: 6°58′49″N 1°50′32″E
- Country: Benin
- Department: Kouffo Department

Area
  - Total: 97 sq mi (250 km^{2})

Population (2013)
  - Total: 128,537
  - Density: 1,331.64/sq mi (514.148/km^{2})
- Time zone: UTC+1 (WAT)

Klouékanmè [klu.e.kɑ̃.mɛ] is a town, arrondissement, and commune in the Kouffo Department of south-western Benin. The commune covers an area of 250 square kilometers and as of 2013 had a population of 128,537 people.

Locales within Klouékanmè Arrondissement include Adjanhonmè, Ahogbèya, Aya-Hohoué, Djotto, Hondji, Klouékanmè, Lanta, and Tchikpé.
