= Lake Toho (Benin) =

Lake in Benin

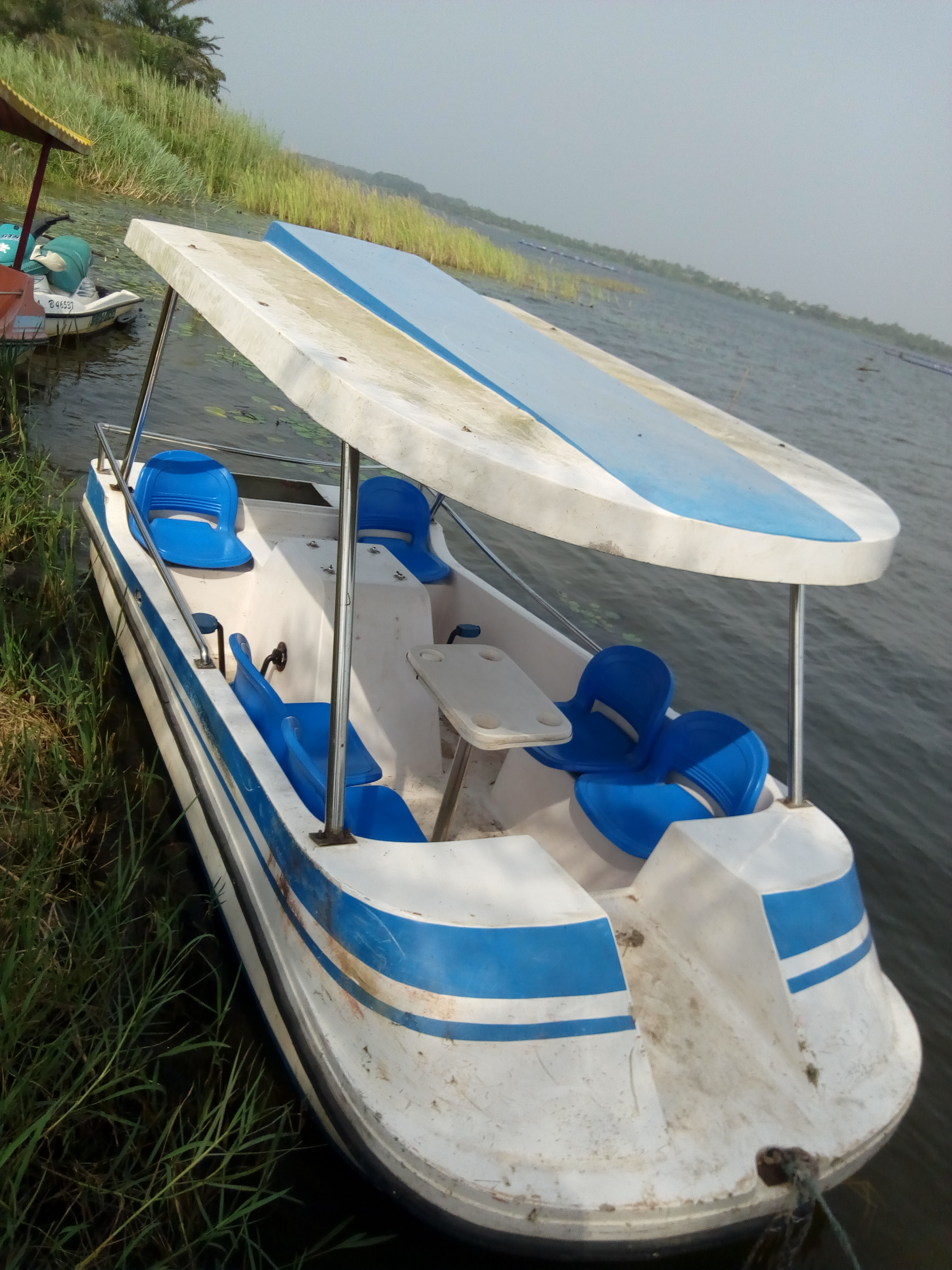
- Boat on the lake

- Location within Benin
- Location: Mono Department, Benin
- Coordinates: 6.617°N 1.774°E
- Basin countries: Benin
- Max. length: 7 km (4.3 mi)
- Max. width: 2.5 km (1.6 mi)
- Surface area: 15 km^{2} (5.8 sq mi)
- Surface elevation: 64 m (210 ft)

Lake Toho is a small lake in Mono Department, Benin.

In May 2018 there was a mass death of fish in the lake, thought to have been caused by some sort of contamination.
