= Dogbo-Tota =

- Commune and city
- Location in Benin
- Coordinates: 6°48′N 1°47′E
- Country: Benin
- Department: Kouffo Department

Area
  - Total: 475 km^{2} (183 sq mi)
- Elevation: 65 m (213 ft)

Population (2013)
  - Total: 101,870
  - Density: 214.46/km^{2} (555.4/sq mi)
- Time zone: UTC+1 (WAT)
- Website: Official website

Dogbo-Tota [dɔg.bɔ.tɔ.ta] (or Dogbo [dɔg.bo]) is a city located in the Kouffo Department of Benin. The commune covers an area of 475 square kilometres and as of 2013 had a population of 101,870 people.

Dogbo, like many areas of Benin, is home to a constituent monarchy.
