= Couffo River =

River in West Africa

Coordinates: 6.603°N 1.979°E

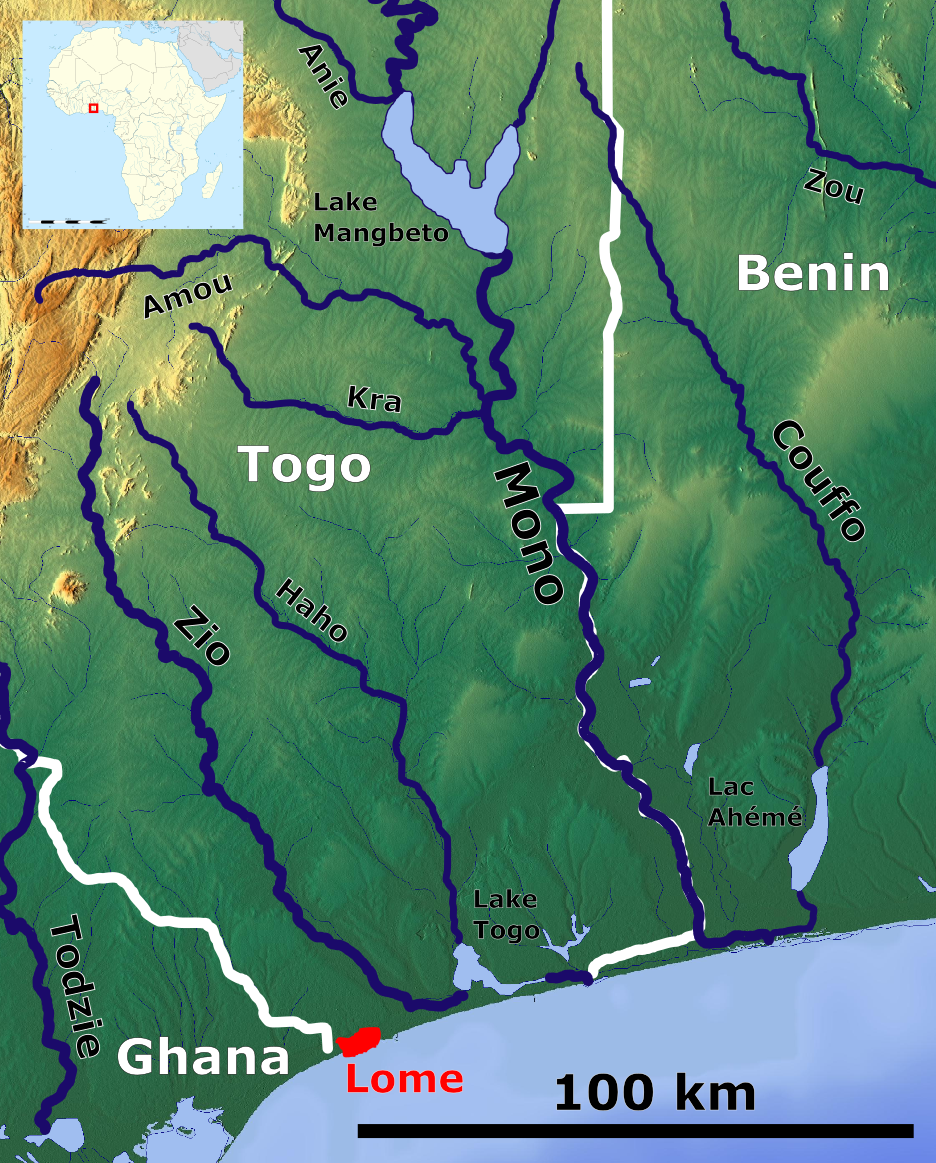
The Couffo (right).

The Couffo or Kouffo is a river in West Africa. It rises in Togo but runs for much of its 125-kilometre (78 mi) course through Benin, draining into Lake Ahémé. It forms part of the Togo–Benin border and also serves as the border between Benin's Kouffo and Zou departments.

== See also ==
- List of rivers of Africa
