= Lake Togbadji =

Lake in Benin

- Location within Benin
- Location: Mono Department, Benin
- Coordinates: 6.743°N 1.703°E
- Basin countries: Benin

Lake Togbadji is a small lake that is located in the Mono Department of Benin. The lake has a surface area of about 5.5km^{2} and is on the Mono River.

The lake is fished for the Mango tilapia (Sarotherodon galilaeus).

The lake is mainly polluted from runoff water, discharges of various wastewater from artisanal activities, livestock farming and open defecation.

== Chemistry ==
During the dry season, there are 0.38 ± 0.16 mg/L of ammonium ions and 0.22 ± 0.03 mg/ during the rainy season. There are 0.20 ± 0.25 mg/L of nitrite ions in the dry season and 0.02 ± 0.01 mg/L in the rainy season while there is 3.72 ± 2.52 mg/L of nitrate ions and 7.84 ± 4.91 mg/L.
