= Aplahoué =

- Commune and city
- Location in Benin
- Coordinates: 6°56′N 1°41′E
- Country: Benin
- Department: Kouffo Department

Area
  - Total: 572 km^{2} (221 sq mi)

Population (2013)
  - Total: 170,069
  - Density: 297.323/km^{2} (770.06/sq mi)

Aplahoué [ap.la.we] is a town and arrondissement in Benin, and is the capital of the Kouffo Department. The commune covers an area of 572 square kilometres and as of 2013 had a population of 170,069 people.
