= Athiémé =

Athiémè
- Town and commune
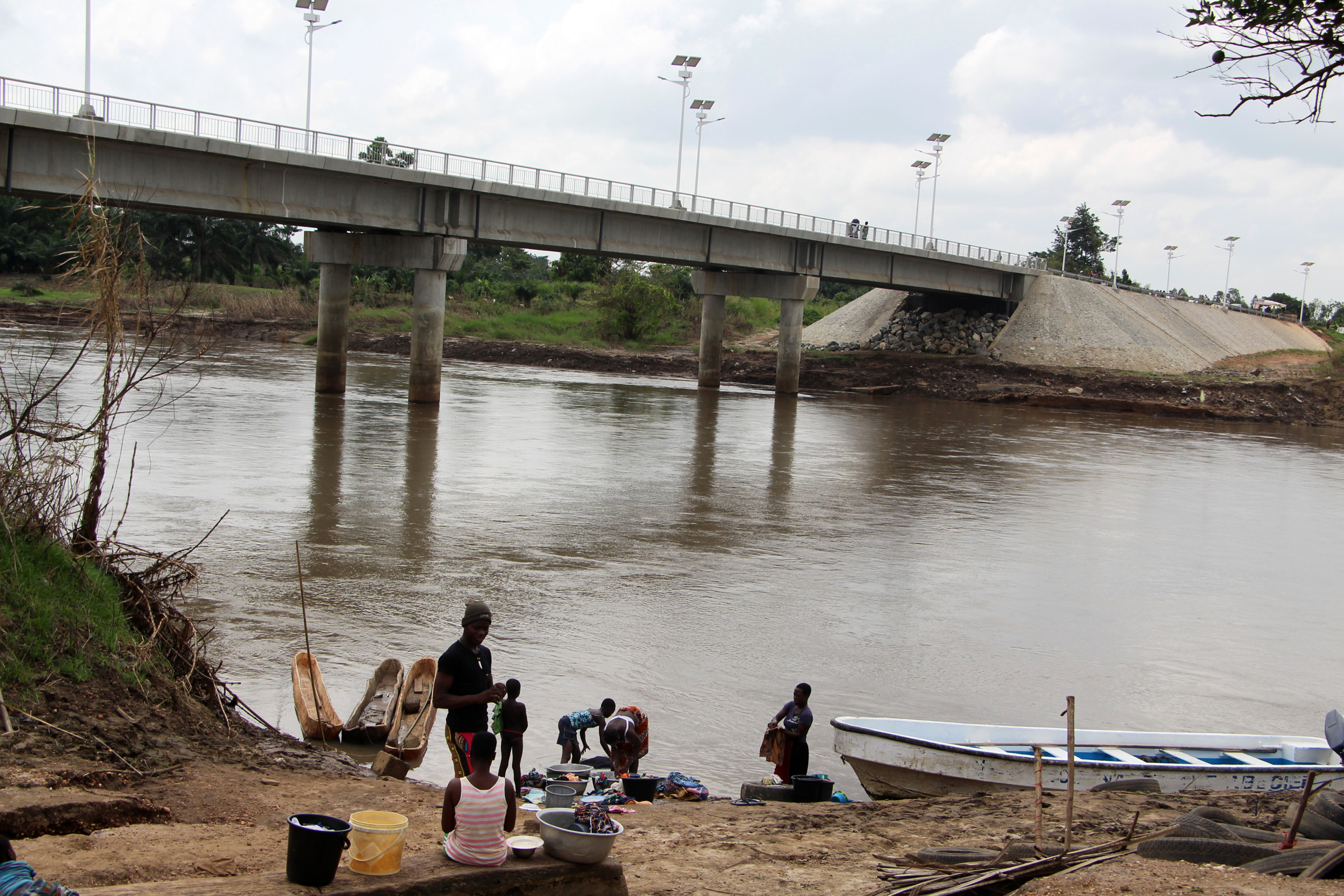
- Access to the new bridge (2016)

- Location in Benin
- Coordinates: 6°35′N 1°40′E
- Country: Benin
- Department: Mono Department

Area
  - Total: 220 km^{2} (85 sq mi)

Population (2013)
  - Total: 56,483

Athiémè [a.tje.mɛ] is a town and arrondissement located in the Mono Department of Benin. The commune covers an area of 220 square kilometres and as of 2013 had a population of 56,483 people.
