= Cito =

Cito may refer to:

== People ==
- Cito Beltran, host of Philippine talk show Agenda with Cito Beltran
- Cito Culver (born 1992), American professional baseball shortstop in the New York Yankees organization
- Cito Dayrit (1951–2021), Filipino fencer and sports executive
- Cito Gaston (born 1944), former Major League Baseball outfielder and manager
- Claus Cito (1882 – 1965), Luxembourgish sculptor
- Ferdinando Cito Filomarino, Italian film director and screenwriter
- Giancarlo Cito (1945–2025), Italian politician and entrepreneur, mayor of Taranto
- Giovanni Cito (1633–1708), Roman Catholic prelate who served as Bishop of Lettere-Gragnano

== Other ==
- Mercedes-Benz Cito, a low-floor midibus built by EvoBus for Continental Europe between 1999 and 2003
- MV Cito, former Dutch cargo vessel from which the Israeli offshore radio station Voice of Peace broadcast

== CITO ==
- CITO-TV, Canadian television station
- Cache-In Trash-Out, are geocaching events and coordinated activities of trash pickup and other maintenance tasks in to improve the environment
