= Lokossa =

- Commune and city
- A women's rights march in Lokossa

- Location in Benin
- Coordinates: 6°38′N 1°43′E
- Country: Benin
- Department: Mono Department

Area
  - Total: 260 km^{2} (100 sq mi)
- Elevation: 64 m (210 ft)

Population (2012)
  - Total: 106,081
  - Density: 410/km^{2} (1,100/sq mi)
- Time zone: UTC+1 (WAT)

Lokossa [lɔ.kɔ.sa] is an arrondissement, commune, and the capital city of Mono Department in Benin, near the border with Togo. The name Lokossa translates into English as "underneath the iroko tree".

The commune covers an area of 260 square kilometres (100 sq mi) and as of 2002 had a population of 77,065 people.
