= Toviklin =

- Commune and city
- Location in Benin
- Coordinates: 6°50′N 1°49′E
- Country: Benin
- Department: Kouffo Department

Area
  - Total: 46 sq mi (120 km^{2})

Population (2013)
  - Total: 88,611
- Time zone: UTC+1 (WAT)

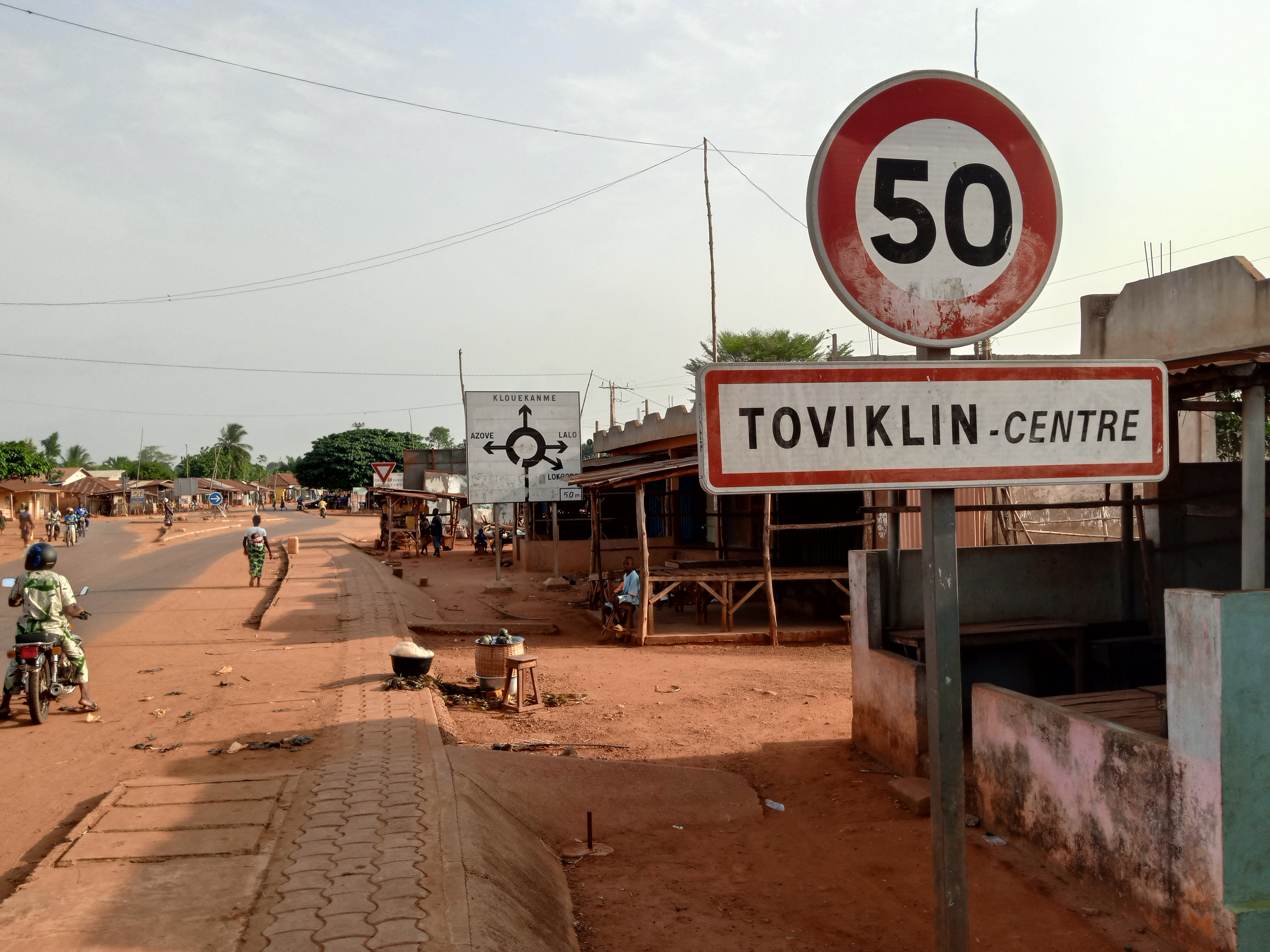

Toviklin [tɔ.vi.klɛ̃] is a town, arrondissement, and commune in the Kouffo Department of south-western Benin. The commune covers an area of 120 square kilometres and as of 2013 had a population of 88,611 people.
