= Lalo, Benin =

Lalo
- Commune and city
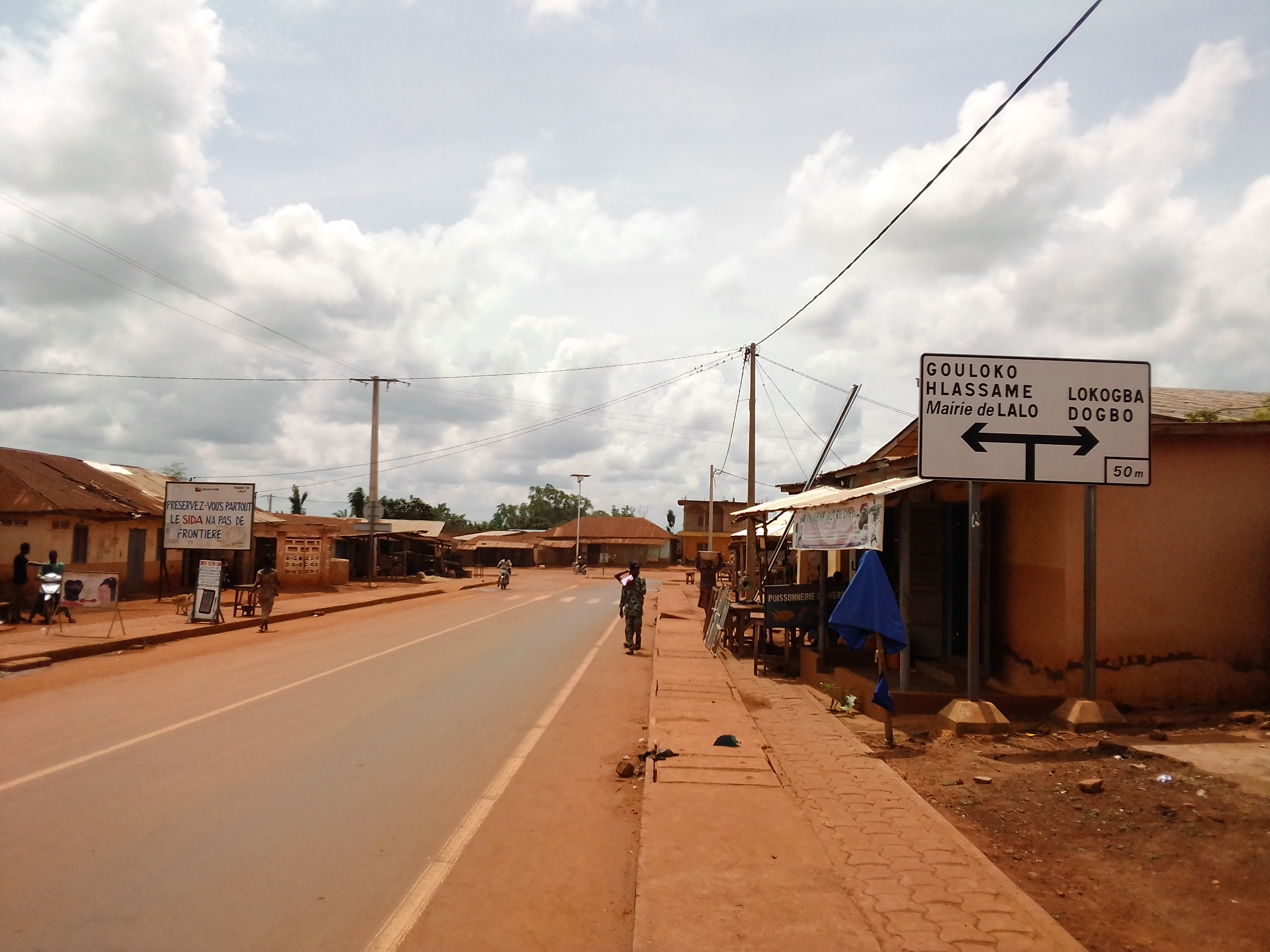
- Road in Lalo, Benin

- Location in Benin
- Coordinates: 6°55′N 1°53′E
- Country: Benin
- Department: Kouffo Department

Area
  - Total: 167 sq mi (432 km^{2})

Population (2013)
  - Total: 119,926
- Time zone: UTC+1 (WAT)

Lalo [la.lo] is a town, arrondissement, and commune in the Kouffo Department of south-western Benin. The commune covers an area of 432 square kilometres (167 sq mi) and as of 2013 had a population of 119,926 people.
