= Bopa =

- Commune and city
- Location in Benin
- Coordinates: 6°35′N 1°59′E
- Country: Benin
- Department: Mono Department

Area
  - Total: 141 sq mi (365 km^{2})

Population (2002)
  - Total: 70,268
- Time zone: UTC+1 (WAT)

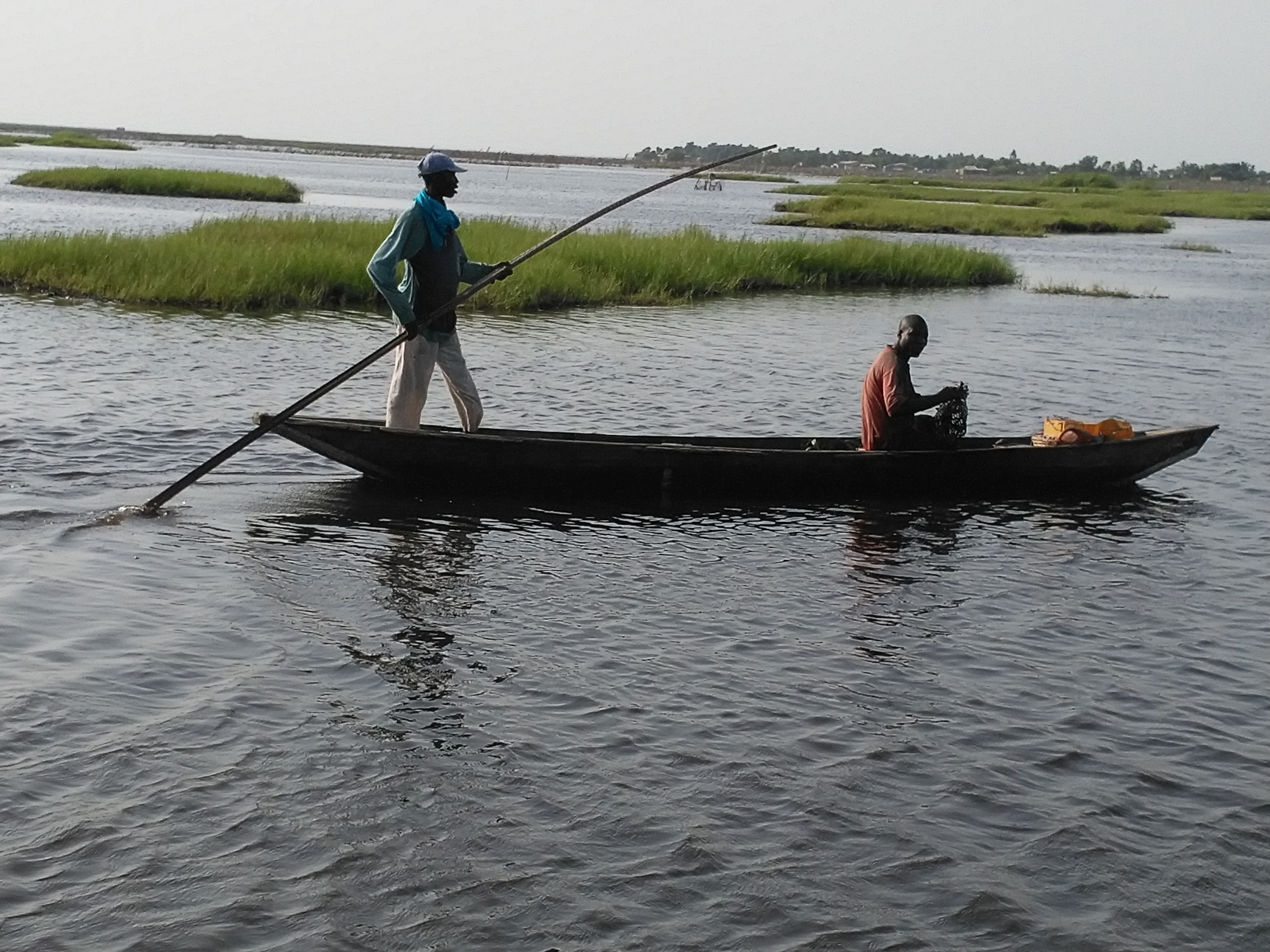
Fishermen in Gbakpodji (Bopa)

Bopa [bɔ.pa] is a town, arrondissement, and commune in the Mono Department of south-western Benin.The commune covers an area of 365 square kilometres and as of 2002 had a population of 70,268 people.
