= Comè =

- Commune and city
- Location in Benin
- Coordinates: 6°24′N 1°53′E
- Country: Benin
- Department: Mono Department

Area
  - Total: 163 km^{2} (63 sq mi)
- Elevation: 17 m (56 ft)

Population (2012)
  - Total: 33,507
- Time zone: UTC+1 (WAT)

Comè [kɔ.mɛ] is a town and arrondissement located in the Mono Department of Benin. The commune covers an area of 163 square kilometres and as of 2012 had a population of 33,507 people. It was home to a refugee camp for Togolese refugees until it was closed in 2006.

Comè is home to a constituent monarchy, currently led by Togbé Akati II Djidjilévo. Djidjilévo claimed the kingdom covers 57 villages, primarily those of the Watchi community.
