= Grand-Popo =

- Commune and city
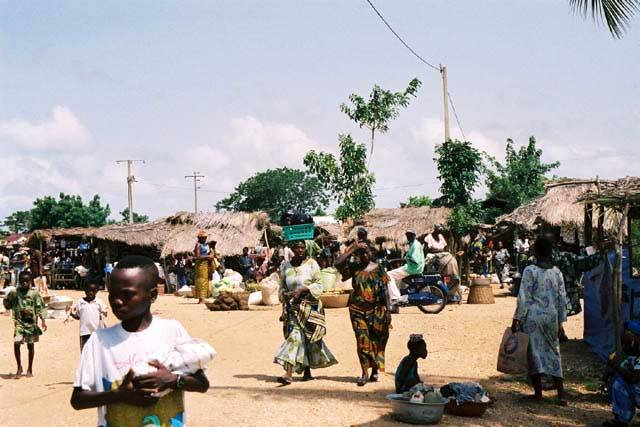

- Location in Benin
- Coordinates: 6°17′N 1°50′E
- Country: Benin
- Department: Mono Department

Area
  - Total: 112 sq mi (289 km^{2})

Population (2013 Census)
  - Total: 57,636
  - Density: 517/sq mi (199/km^{2})
- Time zone: UTC+1 (WAT)

Grand-Popo [gʁɑ̃.pɔ.po] is a town, arrondissement, and commune in the Mono Department of south-western Benin. The commune covers an area of 289 square kilometres and as at the 2013 Census had a population of 57,636 people.

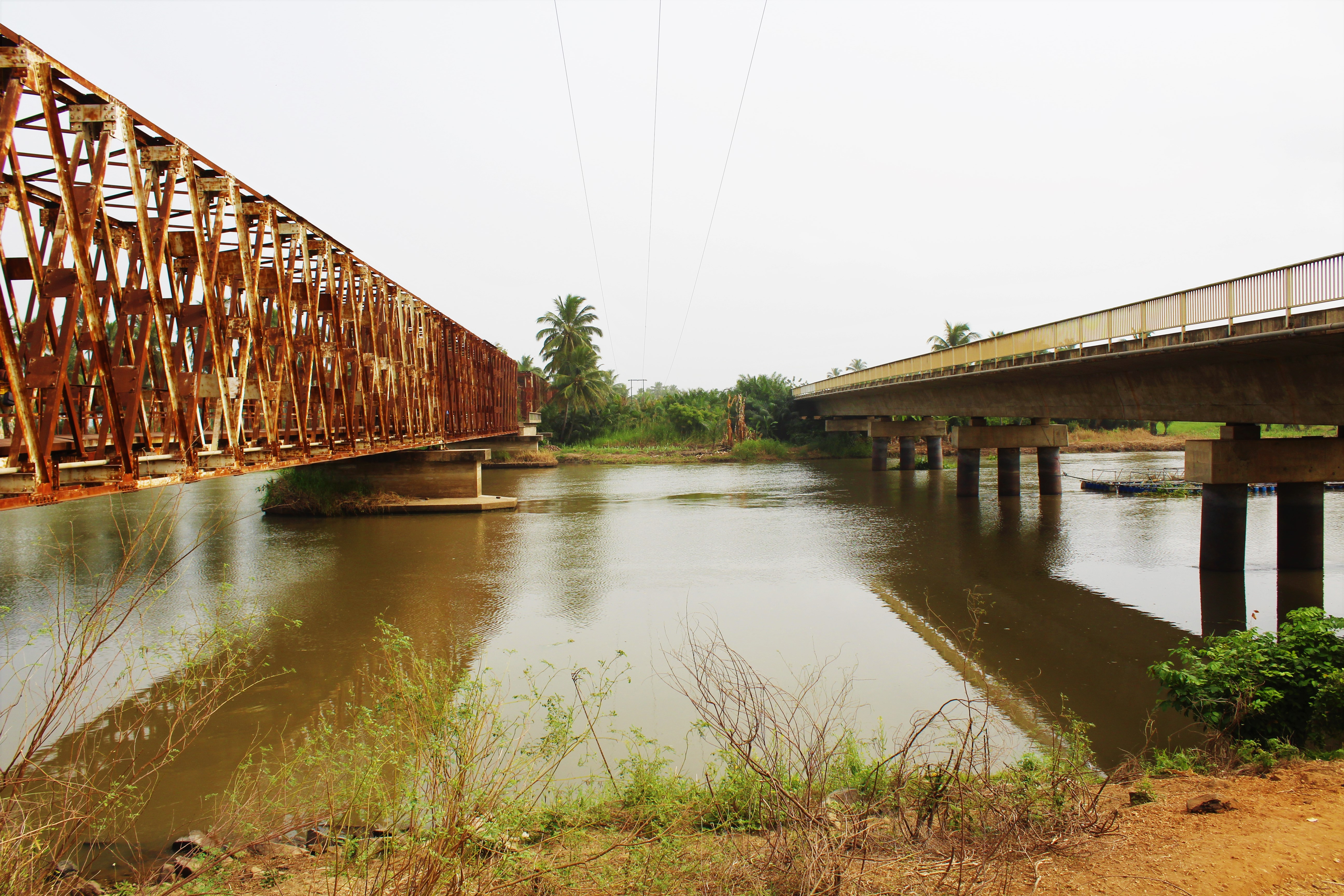
Old and new bridges in Grand-Popo

The term "Grand-Popo" is a European exonym for the ancient town and kingdom of "Hulagan" (Great Hula). The Hula/Xwla/Phla people that once dominated the Togo-Benin coast traditionally regarded Great Hula as their ancestral town of common origin. It is unclear why Europeans began calling it Popo rather than Hula. It may come from a generic Yoruba term "popo" for peoples to their "west", which was subsequently borrowed by the Portuguese to refer to the Hula/Phla specifically. An alternative theory connects the "Popo" term to an ancient ruler called Kpokpo of Tado (an Aja town in the interior), which the Europeans may have confused with Hulagan.

The town grew around the slave trade, but coastal erosion has now destroyed most of the old town. The town is now a centre for voodoo and home to a Finnish-African cultural centre, Villa Karo. The town's main industry is fishing.

The town inspired the name of the French electronic music duo Grand Popo Football Club, as well as the name of the iPad application creator Grand Popo LLC.

== History ==
Trade relations between the Grand-Popo region and Europe were already established in the 17th century, before Porto-Novo emerged as a competitor. Thanks to its position as a peninsula between the ocean and a branch of the Mono River, it was considered a relatively safe anchorage for the slave-based economy. Buildings—typically one-story houses made of fired brick with wooden floors—were concentrated in the Gbekon quarter, near the central market and facing the beach.

Coastal erosion, a phenomenon that became severe in Grand-Popo from the late 1950s onward, has largely destroyed this architecture, now abandoned. Later constructions—early Catholic and Protestant missions built along the shore, as well as the first school—suffered the same fate.

In the 10th century, slavery was practiced between African groups. It was carried out by local armies, occultists, and kings. Slavery in Africa served military purposes but also aimed to foster familiarity with groups considered more powerful at the time, notably through the capture of enslaved women during warfare.

In the 17th century, Fon-speaking kings and military leaders from Djanglanmey dominated the region, facilitating the slave trade with Europeans. Grand-Popo thus served as a commercial post between Europe and Africa prior to the abolition of slavery by Western powers.

There is an oral tradition associated with the traditional Azé of Kankèkpa-Djanglanmey. After oral transmission, history is preserved through books by writers, as well as through written, sung, or rapped poetry.
