= Houéyogbé =

- Commune and city
- Location in Benin
- Coordinates: 6°30′32.4″N 1°49′37.2″E
- Country: Benin
- Department: Mono Department

Area
  - Total: 110 sq mi (290 km^{2})

Population (2002)
  - Total: 74,492
- Time zone: UTC+1 (WAT)

Houéyogbé [we.jɔg.be] is a town, arrondissement, and commune in the Mono Department of south-western Benin. The commune covers an area of 290 square kilometres and as of 2002 had a population of 74,492 people.
