= Kpomassè =

- Commune and city
- Location in Benin
- Coordinates: 6°24′N 1°58′E
- Country: Benin
- Department: Atlantique Department

Area
  - Total: 118 sq mi (305 km^{2})

Population
  - Total: 57,190
- Time zone: UTC+1 (WAT)

Kpomassè [kpɔ.ma.sɛ] is a town, arrondissement, and commune in the Atlantique Department of southern Benin. The commune covers an area of 305 square kilometres and as of 2002 had a population of 57,190 people.

Kpomassè, like many areas of Benin, is home to a constituent monarchy.
