= Mono Department =

Department of Benin

Mono
- Department
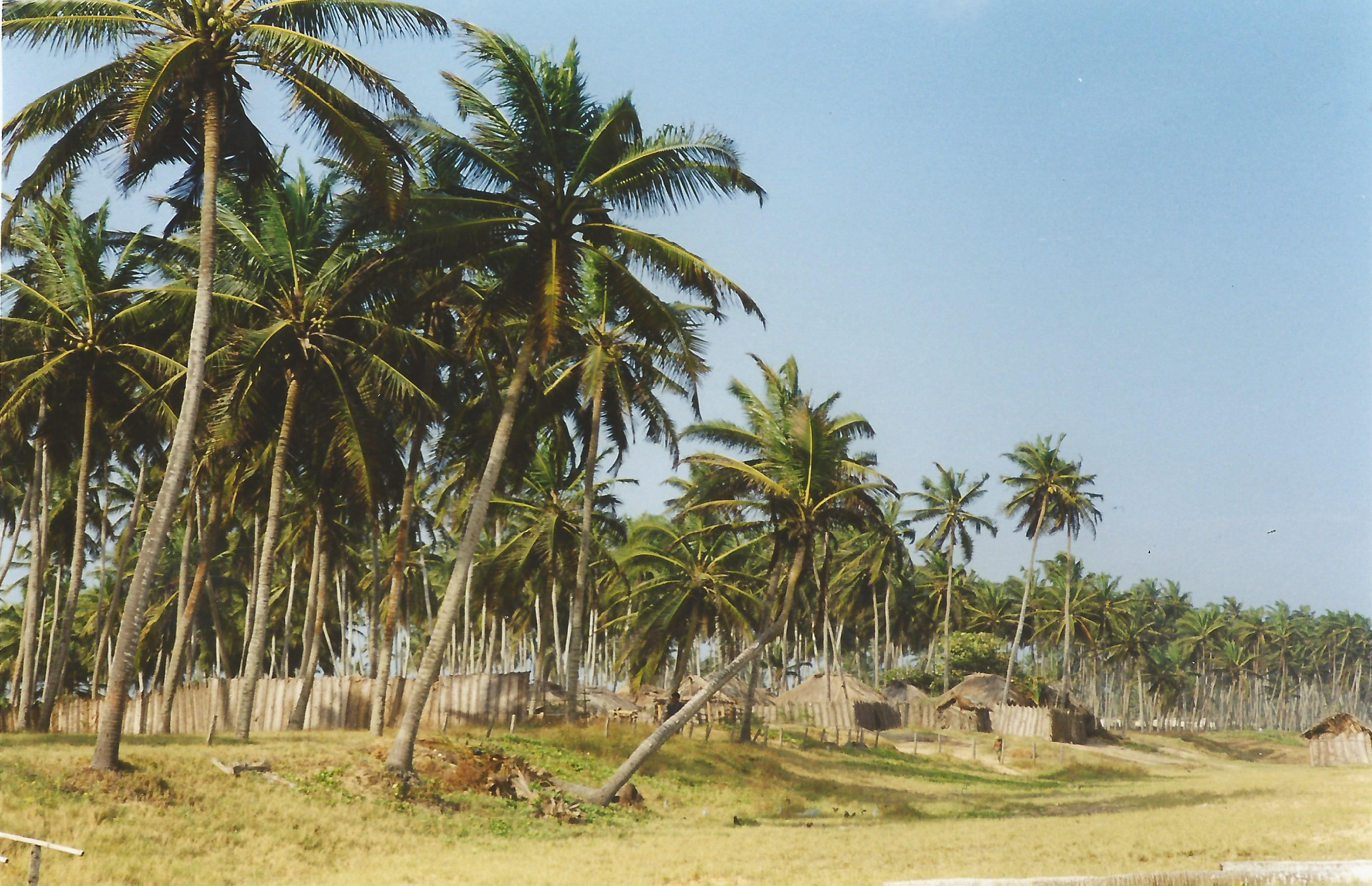

- Map highlighting the Mono Department
- Coordinates: 6°38′N 1°43′E
- Country: Benin
- Capital: Lokossa

Area
  - Total: 1,605 km^{2} (620 sq mi)

Population (2013 census)
  - Total: 495,307
  - Density: 308.6/km^{2} (799.3/sq mi)
- Time zone: UTC+1 (WAT)

Mono ([mo.no]) is one of the twelve departments of Benin, with its capital at Lokossa. It is named for the Mono River which forms much of the border with Togo. The northern areas of the department were split off to create the newly formed Kouffo Department in 1999. Mono is subdivided into six communes, each centred at one of the principal towns, namely, Athiémè, Bopa, Comè, Grand-Popo, Houéyogbé and Lokossa. It has an area of 1,396 square kilometres (539 sq mi).

As of 2013, the total population of the department was 497,243, with 241,554 males and 255,689 females. The proportion of women was 51.40%. The total rural population was 50.30%, while the urban population was 49.70%. The total labour force in the department was 142,220, of which 48.60% were women. The proportion of households with no level of education was 48.70%.

== Geography ==
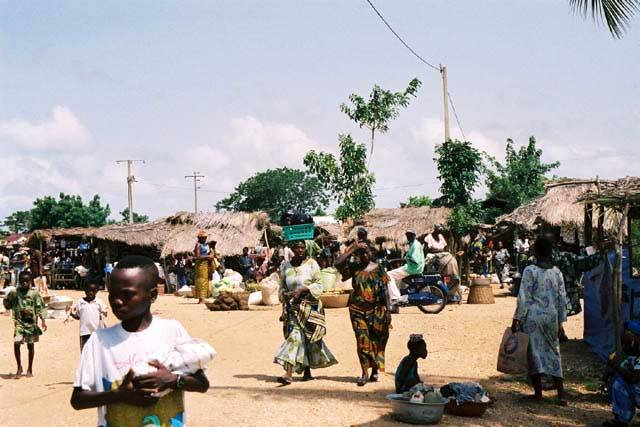
A market in Grand Popo

Mono Department is located in the southwest of Benin and borders Kouffo Department to the north, Atlantique Department to the east, the Atlantic Ocean to the south, and Togo to the west. It is located in a coastal area that has interconnected lakes and lagoons and elongated coastlines with wide marshes. Lake Ahémé, Benin's second largest lake, lies on the border with the Atlantique Department; smaller lakes in the department include Lake Toho and Lake Togbadji. The southern regions of Benin receive two spells from March to July and September to November while the northern regions of the country receive one season of rainfall from May to September. The country receives an average annual rainfall of around 1,200 mm (47 in), but Mono Department receives less rainfall. The department has mostly low-lying sandy coastal plains towards the Atlantic Ocean, marshes, lagoons and lakes. The highest elevation in the department around the coastal plains is 20 m (66 ft) compared to the average 200 m (660 ft) above average mean sea level of the country.

=== Settlements ===
Lokossa is the departmental capital; other major settlements include Athiémè, Bopa, Comè, Grand-Popo, Houéyogbé, Possotomè and Sè.

== Economy ==
Freshwater and seawater fishing is the major profession in the region. Petroleum was discovered in the 1960s in offshore areas, while titanium, low quality iron ore, ilmenite and chromite are the major minerals.

== Demographics ==
Religious census
| Religion | Percent(%) |
| Vodoun | 33.1% |
| Catholic | 20.6% |
| Other Christian | 14.7% |
| Celestial Church | 6.2% |
| Other Protestant | 4.1% |
| Methodist | 2.4% |
| Muslim | 1.5% |
| Other Traditional | 1.2% |
| Other | 4.5% |

According to Benin's 2013 census, the total population of Mono Department was 497,243, with 241,554 males and 255,689 females. The proportion of women was 51.40%. The total rural population was 50.30%, while the urban population was 49.70%. The proportion of women of childbearing age (15 to 49 years old) was 23.70%. The foreign population in the department was 8,975, representing 1.80% of the total population. The labour force participation rate among foreigners aged 15–64 years was 39.70%. The proportion of women among the foreign population constituted 57.00%. The number of households in the department was 105,986 and the average household size was 4.7. The intercensal growth rate of population was 2.90%.

Among women, the average age of first marriage was 21.6 and the average age at maternity was 28.6. The synthetic index of fertility of women was 4.8. The average number of families per house was 1.2 and the average number of persons per room was 1.8. The total labour force in the department was 142,220, of which 48.60% were women. The proportion of households with no level of education was 48.70% and the proportion of households with children attending school was 80.30%. The crude birth rate was 34.7, the general rate of fertility was 146.10 and the gross reproduction rate was 2.30.

The main ethnolinguistic groups in the department are the Aja, Fon, Gen, Phla (also known as Xwla), Saxwe, Phera (also known as Xwela), Kotafon and Ayizo. Other groups include the Aguna.

== Administrative divisions ==
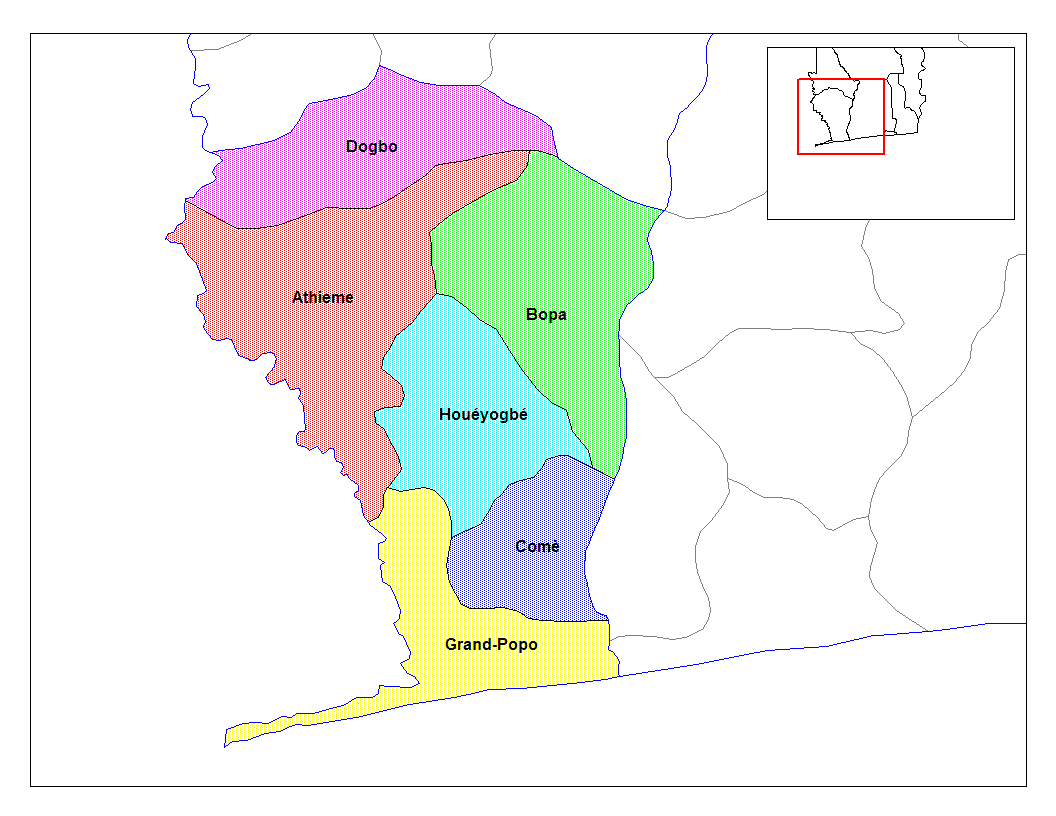
Communes of Mono

Some territories of Mono were moved to the newly formed department of Kouffo in 1999. Mono is subdivided into six communes, each centered at one of the principal towns: Athiémè, Bopa, Comè, Grand-Popo, Houéyogbé and Lokossa. It has an area of 1,396 square kilometres (539 sq mi).

Benin originally had six administrative regions (départements), which have now been bifurcated to make 12. Each of the deconcentrated administrative services (directions départementales) of the sectoral ministries takes care of two administrative regions. A law passed in 1999 transformed the sous-prefectures, the lowest level of territorial administration, into local governments. Municipalities and communal councils have elected representatives who manage the administration of the regions. The latest elections of the municipal and communal councils were held in June 2015.
