= Couffo Department =

Department of Benin

Couffo
- Department
- Map highlighting the Couffo Department
- Coordinates: 6°57′43″N 1°48′06″E
- Country: Benin
- Capital: Aplahoué

Area
  - Total: 2,404 km^{2} (928 sq mi)

Population (2013 census)
  - Total: 741,895
  - Density: 308.6/km^{2} (799.3/sq mi)
- Time zone: UTC+1 (WAT)

Couffo or Kouffo [ku.fo] is one of the twelve departments of Benin. Couffo borders the country of Togo and the departments of Mono, Zou and Atlantique. Since 2008, the department's capital has been Aplahoué. The department of Kouffo was created in 1999 when it was split off from Mono Department.

As of 2013, the total population of the department was 745,328, with 348,574 males and 396,754 females. The proportion of women was 53.20%. The total rural population was 72.20%, while the urban population was 27.80%. The total labour force in the department was 208,974, of which 52.60% were women. The proportion of households with no level of education was 68.60%.

== Geography ==
Couffo Department borders Zou Department to the north, Atlantique Department to the east, Mono Department to the south, and Togo to the west. The department is characterised by plateaus ranging from 20 to 200 m (66 to 656 ft) above the mean sea level, which are split by valleys running from north to south created by the Sahoua River and Couffo River. Couffo river plateaus contains quaternary, tertiary and cretaceous sediments formed with a crystalline basement complex. The layers of sediments have clay-like soil and accumulated iron oxide beneath them. The southern regions of Benin receive two seasons of rainfall from March to July and September to November, while the northern regions of the country receive one season of rainfall from May to September. The country receives an average annual rainfall of around 1,200 mm (47 in).

=== Settlements ===
Aplahoué is the departmental capital; other major settlements include Djakotomey, Dogbo-Tota, Klouékanmè, Lalo and Toviklin.

== Demographics ==
Religious census
Religion	Percent(%)
Vodoun	56.5%
Other Christian	15.2%
Catholic	5.9%
Celestial Church	5.7%
Other Protestant	5.6%
Methodist	2.2%
Other Traditional	1.4%
Muslim	0.9%
Other	2.6%

According to Benin's 2013 census, the total population of the department was 745,328, with 348,574 males and 396,754 females. The proportion of women was 53.20%. The total rural population was 72.20%, while the urban population was 27.80%. The proportion of women of childbearing age (15 to 49 years old) was 24.30%. The foreign population was 2,167, representing 0.30% of the total population in the department. The labour force participation rate among foreigners aged 15–64 years was 43.00%. The proportion of women among the foreign population constituted 62.50%. The number of households in the department was 140,444 and the average household size was 5.3. The intercensal growth rate of the population was 3.20%.

Among women, the average age at first marriage was 21.4 and the average age at maternity was 29. The synthetic index of fertility of women was 5.4. The average number of families in a house was 1.3 and the average number of persons per room was 2.0. The total labour force in the department was 208,974, of which 52.60% were women. The proportion of households with no level of education was 68.60% and the proportion of households with children attending school was 60.20%. The crude birth rate was 40.1, the general rate of fertility was 165.30 and the gross reproduction rate was 2.70.

The main ethnolinguistic groups in the department are the Fon, Aja, Mina, Kotafon, Ayizo, and Saxwe.

== Administrative divisions ==
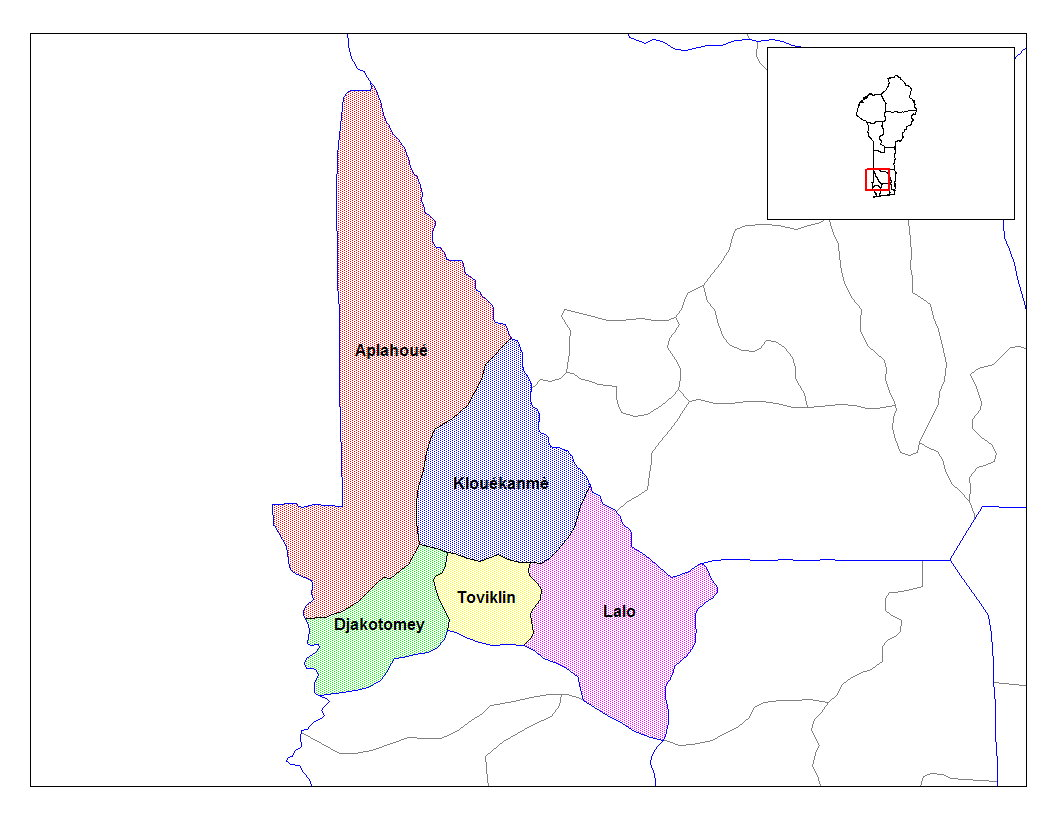
Communes of Couffo

The department of Kouffo was created in 1999 when it was split off from Mono Department. Its capital is Aplahoué. Couffo is subdivided into six communes, each centered at one of the principal towns: Aplahoué, Djakotomey, Klouékanmè, Lalo, Toviklin and Dogbo-Tota.

Benin originally had six administrative regions (départements), which have now been bifurcated to make 12. Each of the deconcentrated administrative services (directions départementales) of the sectoral ministries takes care of two administrative regions. A law passed in 1999 transformed the sous-prefectures, the lowest level of territorial administration, into local governments. Municipalities and communal councils have elected representatives who manage the administration of the regions. The latest elections of the municipal and communal councils were held in June 2015.
