= 3rd arrondissement =

3rd arrondissement may refer to:

France

- 3rd arrondissement of Lyon
- 3rd arrondissement of Marseille
- 3rd arrondissement of Paris

Benin

- 3rd arrondissement of Parakou
- 3rd arrondissement of Porto-Novo
- 3rd arrondissement of the Littoral Department
