= 2nd arrondissement =

2nd arrondissement may refer to:

France

- 2nd arrondissement of Lyon
- 2nd arrondissement of Marseille
- 2nd arrondissement of Paris

Benin

- 2nd arrondissement of Parakou
- 2nd arrondissement of Porto-Novo
- 2nd arrondissement of the Littoral Department
