= 5th arrondissement =

5th arrondissement may refer to:

France

- 5th arrondissement of Lyon
- 5th arrondissement of Marseille
- 5th arrondissement of Paris

Benin

- 5th arrondissement of Porto-Novo
- 5th arrondissement of the Littoral Department
