= Adande =

Adande may refer to the following people:

Given name

- Adande Thorne, Trinidadian-American YouTube personality

Surname

- Alexandre Sènou Adandé, African ethnologist
  - Alexandre Sènou Adandé Ethnographic Museum in Benin
- Alexis Adandé (born 1949), Beninese archaeologist
- J.A. Adande (born 1970), American sportswriter
