= 4th arrondissement =

The 4th arrondissement may refer to:

France

- 4th arrondissement of Lyon
- 4th arrondissement of Marseille
- 4th arrondissement of Paris

Benin

- 4th arrondissement of Porto-Novo
- 4th arrondissement of the Littoral Department
