= List of mosques in Benin =

This is a list of mosques in Benin.

Name	Images	Location	Date	Remarks
Cotonou Central Mosque		Cotonou, Littoral		
Great Mosque of Porto-Novo		Porto-Novo, Ouémé	1925	
Parakou Mosque		Parakou, Borgou		
Tanéka-Béri Mosque		Tanéka-Béri, Copargo, Donga		

== See also ==
- Religion in Benin
- Lists of mosques
