= Great Mosque of Porto-Novo =

Mosque in Porto-Novo, Ouémé, Benin

- Grande Mosquee de Porto-Novo
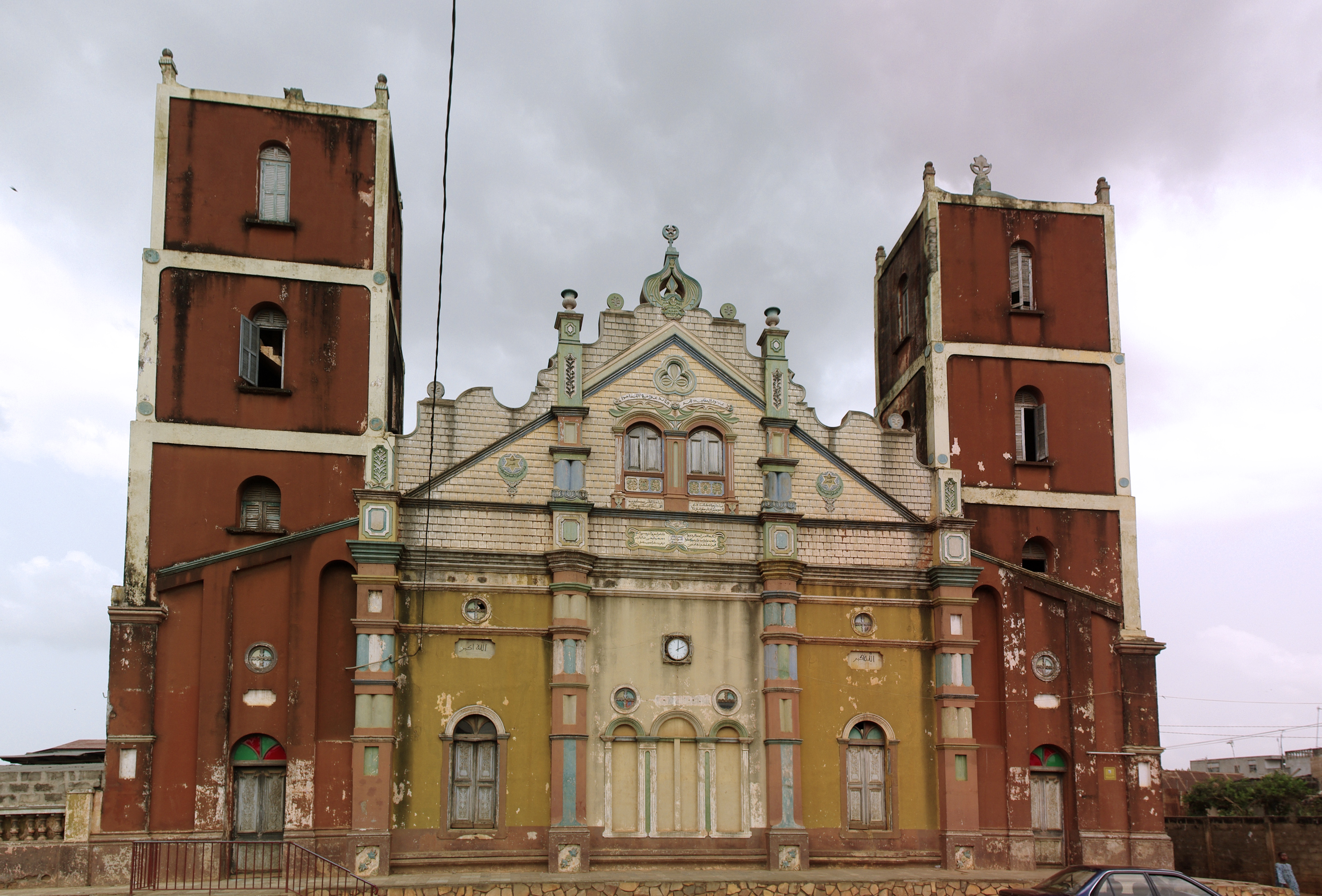

- Benin

Religion
- Affiliation: Islam
- Branch/tradition: Sunni

Location
- Location: Porto-Novo, Ouémé, Benin
- Interactive map of Great Mosque of Porto-Novo
- Coordinates: 6°28′18.177″N 2°37′41.0196″E

Architecture
- Type: mosque
- Style: Afro-Brazilians
- Groundbreaking: 1912
- Completed: 1925
- Minaret: 2

The Great Mosque of Porto-Novo (French: Grande Mosquee de Porto-Novo) is a mosque in Porto-Novo, Ouémé Department, Benin.

== History ==
The construction of the mosque started in 1912 and completed in 1925 during the French Dahomey. It was recently declared a historical monument by Porto-Novo city government.

== Architecture ==
The Afro-Brazilians architectural-style mosque was constructed resembling a chapel with a long central hall and shallow vaulted roof. The front facade is decorated with floral, vegetable and scrolled stucco molding.

== See also ==
- Religion in Benin
- List of mosques in Benin
