= Gun people =

Ethnic group in Benin and Nigeria

Gun
Egun, Ogu, Gun-nu, Gunnuvi
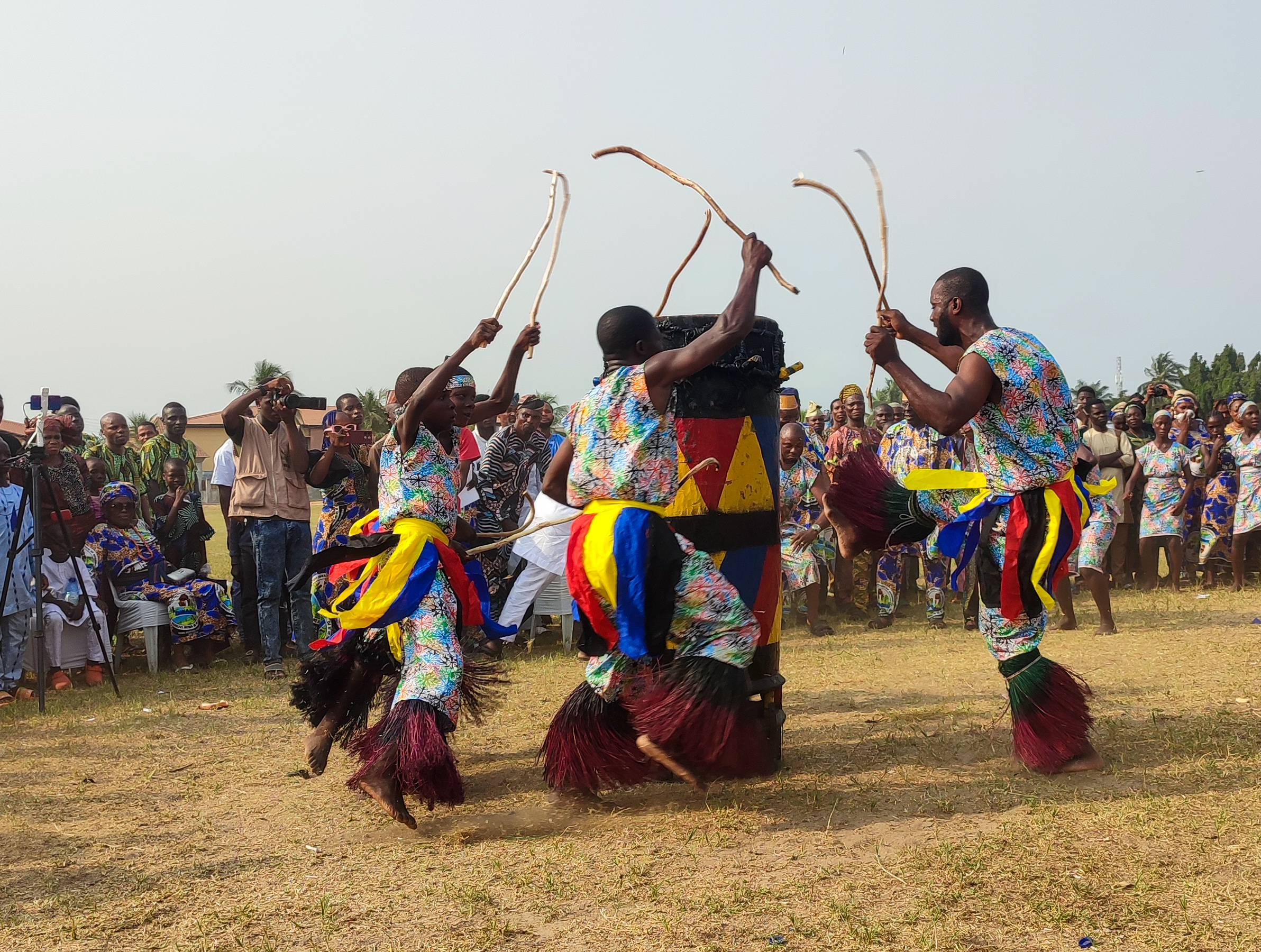
- Gun men drumming the Sato in Badagry

Total population
- 811,000

Regions with significant populations
- Nigeria, Benin

Languages
- Gun, French

Religion
- Christianity, Islam, Vodun

Related ethnic groups
- Pha Phlera, Yoruba, Fon, Ewe, Adja

Video in language of the Ogu people (Gungbe) introducing Gungbe Wikipedia

The Gun people (Goun in French), also rendered Ogu, Ogun or Egun, are an ethnic group principally found in Ouémé Department in the southeast of the Republic of Benin, as well as in Lagos and Ogun State regions of southwestern Nigeria. They speak the Gun language. The Gun account for about 15% of the indigenous population of Lagos State, and 6% of the total population of the Republic of Benin, although their parental ethnic group Fon represents the majority in Benin.

== Origin ==
The Gun are Gbe speaking people originating from in the old Dahomey presently known as Republic of Benin. They are an offshoot of the Fon people who migrated from Kingdom of Allada in the Republic of Benin. According to Olaide-Mesewaku, A.B., a historian; some of them migrated to Badagry as early as the 15th century.

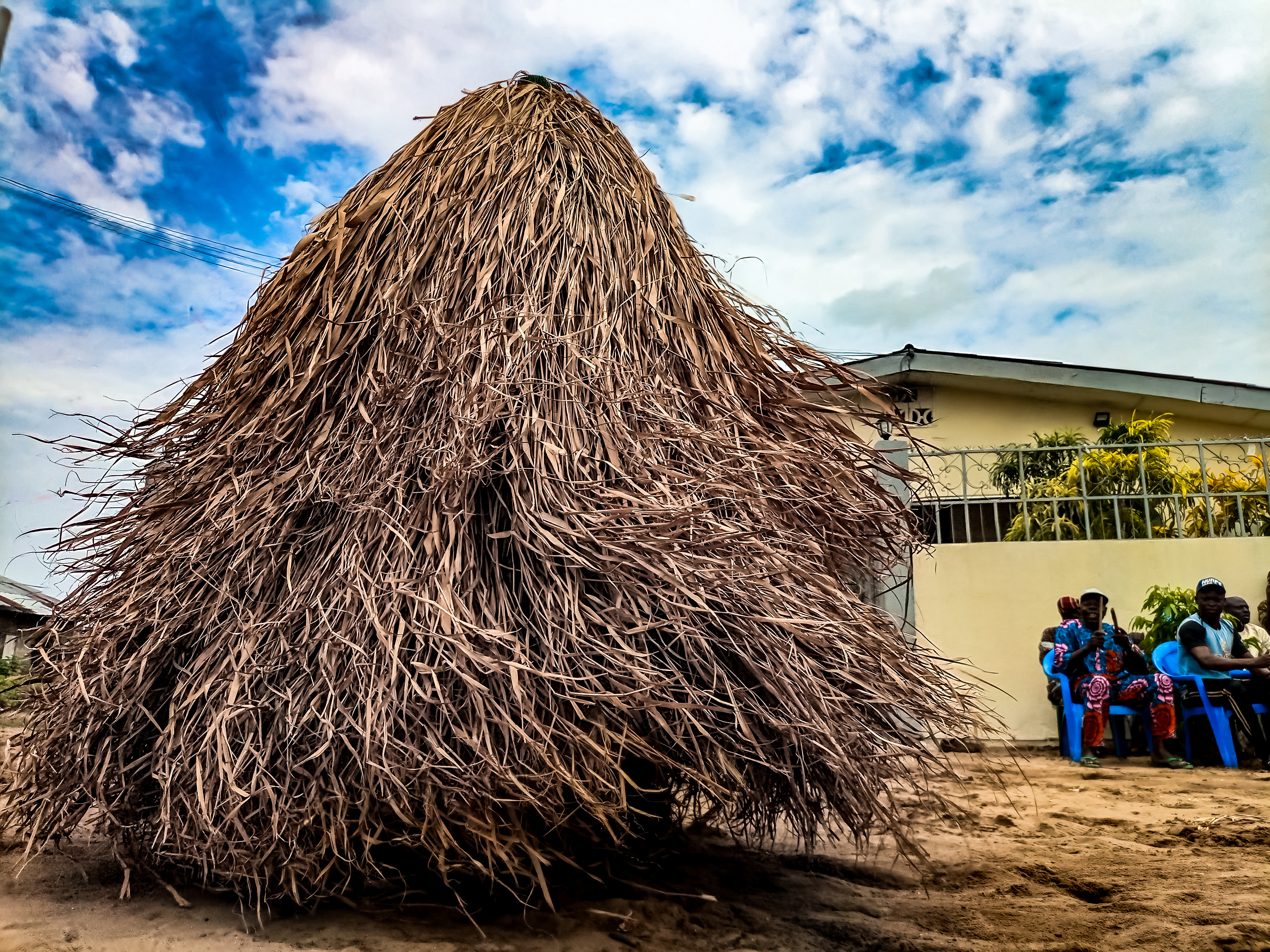
The Zangbeto masquerade

== Geography and people ==
The Ogu people are found in Porto-Novo, capital city of Benin Republic, in Badagry, in the Yewa, in Ipokia region of Ogun State and in Makoko in Lagos. Since their environment is surrounded by water, majority of Gun people are into fishing, coconut processing and salt production, while some are involved in trading and farming. The Gun people strongly believe in their traditions despite most of them being followers of other religions, they are seen worshipping a night watcher spirit called Zangbeto. (A Nightman).

The Gun people share similarities with other Gbe people and Yorubas as during the C17-18th the Dahomey Empire was under the Oyo Empire rule, thus the strengthen relationship between both ethnicities.

== Bibliography ==
- J. A. Fiberesima (1990). Okrika: In Search of an Ancestry. Evans Brothers. ISBN 978-978-167-450-1.
- A. Babatunde Olaide-Mesewaku; Babatunde A. Olaide-Mesewaku (2001). Badagry district, 1863-1999. John West Publications Ltd. ISBN 978-978-163-090-3.
- Akinjide Osuntokun (1987). History of the Peoples of Lagos State. Lantern Books. ISBN 978-978-2281-48-7.
