= Cotonou Central Mosque =

Mosque in Cotonou, Benin

- Mosquée Centrale de Cotonou
- Benin

Religion
- Affiliation: Islam
- Branch/tradition: Sunni

Location
- Location: Cotonou, Littoral, Benin
- Interactive map of Cotonou Central Mosque
- Coordinates: 6.361846°N 2.397802°E

Architecture
- Type: mosque

The Cotonou Central Mosque (French: Mosquée Centrale de Cotonou) is a mosque in Cotonou, Littoral, Benin. It is the most important building for the country's Muslims.

== See also ==
- Religion in Benin
- List of mosques in Benin
