= Alounloun =

Beninese musical instrument

The alounloun is a Beninese musical instrument, used to play a type of music called adjogan. It is a stick with metallic rings attached, which jingle in time with the beating of the stick. The alounloun is said to descend from the staff of King Te-Agdanlin. The alounloun was established for the royal court in the Porto-Novo area; it was initially a symbol of the king's power that was later transformed into a musical instrument. It became a tradition to use the alounloun to honor eminent officials in the royal court. An alounloun is on display at the Royal Palace Museum in Porto-Novo.

== Historical background ==
The alounloun originated as a staff symbolizing the power of the king of Allada (a kingdom in southern Benin). Te-Agdanlin, founder of the kingdom of Porto-Novo, inherited it from his father King De-Kopkon when he died. He took the alounloun with him during the migration towards southeastern Benin where he created the kingdom of Hogbonou (Porto-Novo). After he in turn died, the alounloun underwent various transformations depending on the taste and aspirations of each king. A descendant of Te'Agbanlin, De-Gbeyon, transformed the stick into a musical instrument during his reign (1765-1775). From that time on, it has been used to accompany songs paying homage to Porto-Novoan royalty, living or deceased. Roman Catholic evangelism and the Vatican II Council led Father Francis Aupiais, parish priest of Porto-Novo in the 1930s, to inaugurate an Epiphany procession through the city. The alounloun was played on this occasion in honour of Jesus.

Today the alounloun is used to play a type of music called adjogan in formal, royal ceremonies. Adjogan music is also used in Catholic churches in the Porto-Novo area; in this case the royal insignia on the staff is changed from a bird crest to a Christian cross. The instrument is played only by women.

== Physical characteristics ==
The alounloun is a finely worked iron bar about one meter long, covered in copper with rings that manually slide up and down the stick to produce music. It has a handle in the shape of a bird with a coiled crested neck as well as a spindle and a pad. It is an idiophone: that is, an instrument that produces sound by vibrating as a whole when the body of the instrument itself is struck, shaken, rubbed, plucked or stamped, without the use of strings or membranes.
