= Zangbeto =

Spirits in African tradition

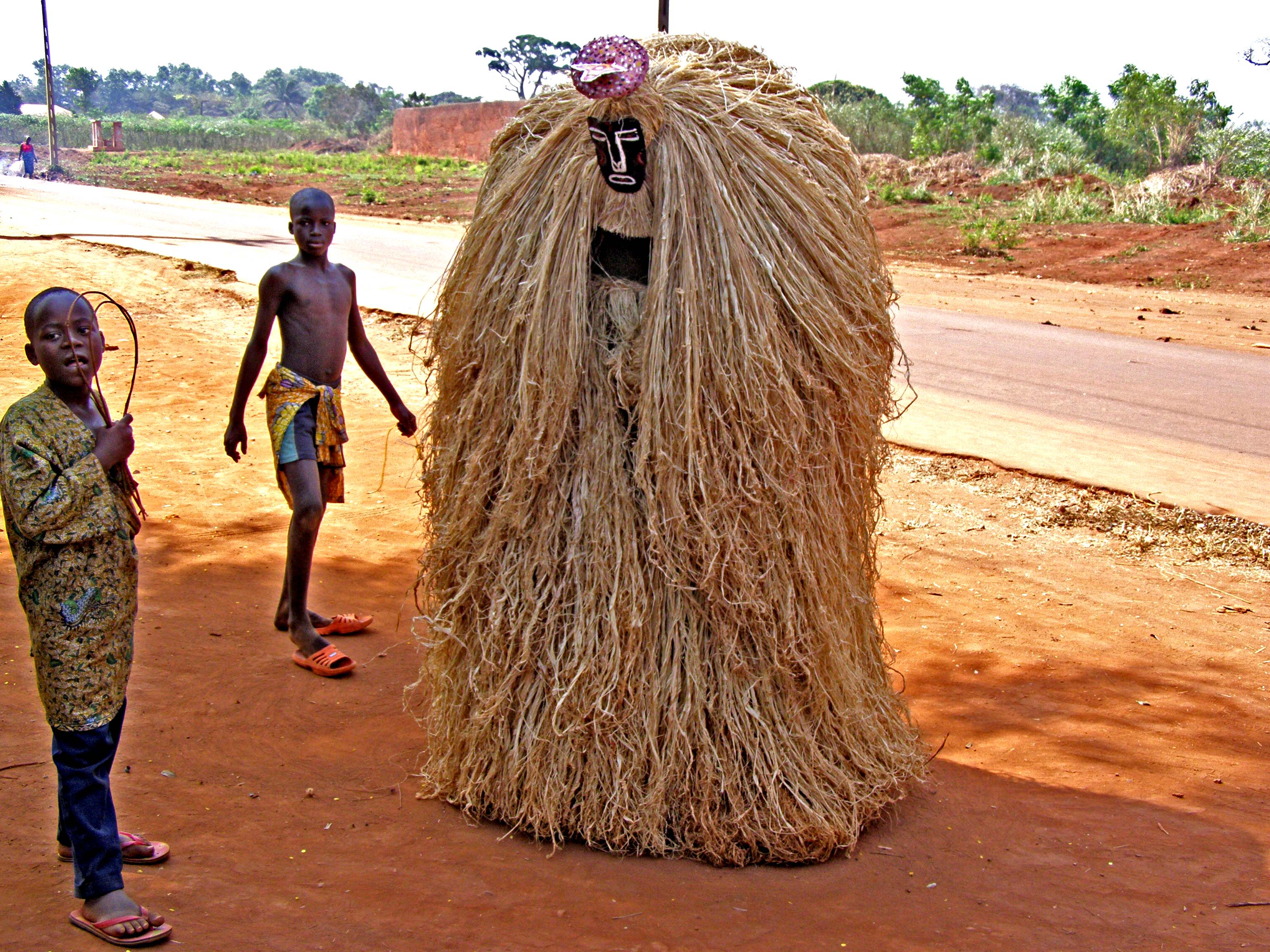
Zangbeto in 2006

Zangbeto in a vodun-festival in Benin.

Zangbeto are the traditional Vodún guardians of the night among the Ogu (or Egun) people of Benin, Togo, and Nigeria. A traditional police and security institution, the Zangbeto cult is charged with the maintenance of law and order, and ensures safety and security within Ogu communities. They are highly revered and act as an unofficial police force patrolling the streets, especially in the night, watching over people and their properties, and tracking down criminals and presenting them to the community to punish. Originally created to scare the enemy away, Zangbeto will wander the streets to detect thieves and witches, and to protect law and order.

== Description ==
Relating its fundamental cultural role in local vigilantism and community policing in Ogu societies, Zangbeto is a term in Gun language which means "men of the night" or "night-watchmen". According to further linguistic etymology the term Zangbeto is derived from "zan", meaning night, and "gbeto", meaning person or people, reinforcing its role as "people of the night".

The Zangbeto takes on a covering made from an intricate mass of tiny strands of hay, raffia, or other threadlike materials, which are sometimes dyed in very colorful hues. These raffia costumes, sometimes adorned with masks or crowned with horns, are the only outward symbols of the Zangbeto society. It is considered a serious offense to touch the raffia robes or to suggest that they are worn by men; traditionally, such an offense was punishable by death. They are able to fall into a trance which, according to tradition, enables their bodies to be inhabited by spirits who possess special knowledge of the actions of people. However, Ogu legend tells that there are no humans under the costume, only spirits of the night.

In Ogu culture, the Zangbetos are the traditional security guards or policemen of their communities. They are said to form a secret society which can only be strictly attended by Zangbeto and vodúnsɛntó. Zangbeto is deemed to have spiritistic and magical abilities, such as swallowing splinters of glass without coming to any harm and scaring away even witches. They are also believed to have powers to purify and protect the town and villages from social evils. In a trance, the Zangbeto are said to evoke a power that inhabited the earth long before the appearance of man and provide a source of wisdom and continuity for the Ogu people. Some oral traditions assert that Zangbeto are sea spirits who once emerged from the ocean clothed in raffia to serve the community, emphasizing their mythical and sacred origins.

Elaborate festivals built around the Zangbeto are held regularly in different Ogu communities across West Africa. The popular ones are those that hold in Porto-Novo, Benin Republic and in Ajido, Lagos, Nigeria. These festivals comprise colorful displays, electrifying performances, and magic by the man inside the Zangbeto.

== See also ==
- Egungun

== Works cited ==
- Butler, Stuart (2006). Benin. Guilford, Connecticut: Bradt Travel Guides, The Globe Pequot Press. ISBN 1-84162-148-X.
- Hunsu, Folashade (2011). Zangbeto: Navigating Between the Spaces of Oral Art, Communal Security and Conflict Mediation in Badagry, Nigeria. S2CID 106403955.
- Images, Yanick Folly/AFP/Getty (12 January 2020). "Benin celebrates west African voodoo – in pictures". The Guardian. ISSN 0261-3077.
- Okunola, Rashidi Akanji; Ojo, Matthias Olufemi Dada (12 March 2013). "Zangbeto: The Traditional Way of Policing and Securing the Community among the Ogu (Egun) People in Badagry, Nigeria". Issues in Ethnology and Anthropology. 8 (1): 199–220. doi:10.21301/eap.v8i1.9. ISSN 2334-8801.
- Okure, Dominic (2016). "Symbolism and Social Control of Zangbeto among the Ogu of Southwestern Nigeria" (PDF). Cultural Anthropology and Ethnosemiotics. 2 (2): 10–30.
- Olukoya, Sam (27 September 2018). "'Everyone fears the Zangbeto': Frustrated by crime and corruption, some Nigerians put their faith in voodoo traditions". National Post.
- "Voodoo festival shows strength of traditions". New York Post. Associated Press. 27 September 2018.
- "Zangbeto: Voodoo Savior of Benin's Mangroves". Voice of America. Archived from the original on 5 December 2020.
