= Alexis Adandé =

Beninese archaeologist

- Born: Alexis Bertrand Agunmaro Adandé; April 7, 1949 (age 77); Dakar, Senegal
- Citizenship: Benin
- Occupation: Archaeologist

Alexis Bertrand Agunmaro Adandé (born 7 April 1949) is an archaeologist from Benin, who has been key to the foundation of the discipline in the country.

== Biography ==
Alexis Bertrand Agunmaro Adandé was born on 7 April 1949 in Dakar, Senegal. His father was Alexandre Adandé who was key to the organisation of the First World Festival of Negro Arts in 1969. Between 1954 and 1968 he studied at primary and secondary levels in Dakar, and Porto-Novo. He went on to study at the Institute of Higher Education of Benin in Lomé, Togo, and from there he continued his studies at University of Paris I, Sorbonne, where he graduated with an MA in 1972.

== Career ==
From 1972 to 1979 Adandé taught history and geography at secondary schools in Benin. In 1979 he returned to University of Paris I, Sorbonne to study archaeology: in 1980 he was awarded a Diploma of Advanced Studies in Archaeology; in 1984 a PhD. From 1978 he worked as a lecturer at the University of Abomey-Calavi whilst studying for his PhD. On completion of his PhD, he continued to teach there until 1986, when he was promoted to Assistant Professor of Archaeology. He was promoted to Senior Lecturer in Archaeology in 1993. From 1989 to 1995, he was Deputy Head of the Department of History and Archaeology of the University of Benin. From 1992 to 1994 he was chair of the West African Archaeological Association. He was Executive Director of the West African Museums Programme from 1995 to 2001. From 2003 to 2007 he was head of the Archaeological Research Team of Benin (ERAB). He retired from the University of Abomey-Calavi in 2012.

== Research ==
Adandé's research focused on Benin and West Africa and is notable as an African archaeologist who has transformed the discipline in his home country. In 2017 he gave a keynote address at the conference of the West African Archaeological Association entitled: "Nous, archéologues africains, qui servons-nous?" / " We, African Archaeologists, who do we Serve?"

=== Excavations ===
Adandé has directed many excavations in Benin, these include: the Allada region (1981-2); Mono Valley Rescue Project (1990-3); Ouidah (1991); Ouessè Archaeological Research Project Manager (1992); co-led a project on Beninese-Danish archaeology (2002-04). He collaborated with Neil L Norman to explore the history of the transatlantic slave trade and the Kingdom of Dahomey from an archaeological perspective. He was the first archaeologist to conduct well-documented excavations at Togoudo Awutè Allada, which formed his doctoral research. He was part of the Archaeological Research Team of Benin which conducted the first comprehensive survey of monuments in Benin. He has advocated for archaeological research programmes across West Africa to transcend modern national boundaries.

=== Museums ===
In 1988 Adandé curated the first archaeological exhibition in Benin: “Ten years of archaeological research in Benin”, which was held on the campus of Abomey-Calavi and Honmè Museum. He has worked on integrating Benin's education system with its cultural heritage. In 2002 he co-edited with Emmanuel Arinze Museums and Urban Culture in West Africa. He has also collaborated with UNESCO to deliver training on how to nominate places for World Heritage Site status.
