= 2nd arrondissement of the Littoral Department =

2nd arrondissement
- Arrondissement
- Interactive map of 2nd arrondissement
- Coordinates: 6.370235°N 2.427778°E
- Country: Benin
- Department: Littoral Department
- Commune: Cotonou

Population (2002)
  - Total: 53,708
- Time zone: UTC+1 (WAT)

2nd arrondissement is an arrondissement in the Littoral department of Benin. It is an administrative division under the jurisdiction of the commune of Cotonou. According to the population census conducted by the Institut National de la Statistique Benin on February 15, 2002, the arrondissement had a total population of 53,708.
