= 2nd arrondissement of Parakou =

- Arrondissement
- Interactive map of 2nd arrondissement of Parakou
- Coordinates: 9.3502°N 2.6193°E
- Country: Benin
- Department: Borgou Department
- Commune: Parakou

Population (2002)
  - Total: 45,765
- Time zone: UTC+1 (WAT)

The 2nd arrondissement of Parakou is located in the Borgou Department of Benin. It serves as an administrative division under the jurisdiction of the commune of Parakou. According to the population census conducted by the Institut National de la Statistique Benin on February 15, 2002, the arrondissement had a total population of 45,765.
