= Royal Palace, Porto-Novo =

Coordinates: 6.4693°N 2.6250°E

The Royal Palace, also known as King Toffa's Palace and more recently Musée Honmé, is a former royal residence and today museum in Porto-Novo, Benin.

It contains an example of an Alounloun and most displays are related to the King Toffa period.

== World Heritage Site ==
Royal Palace, Porto-Novo
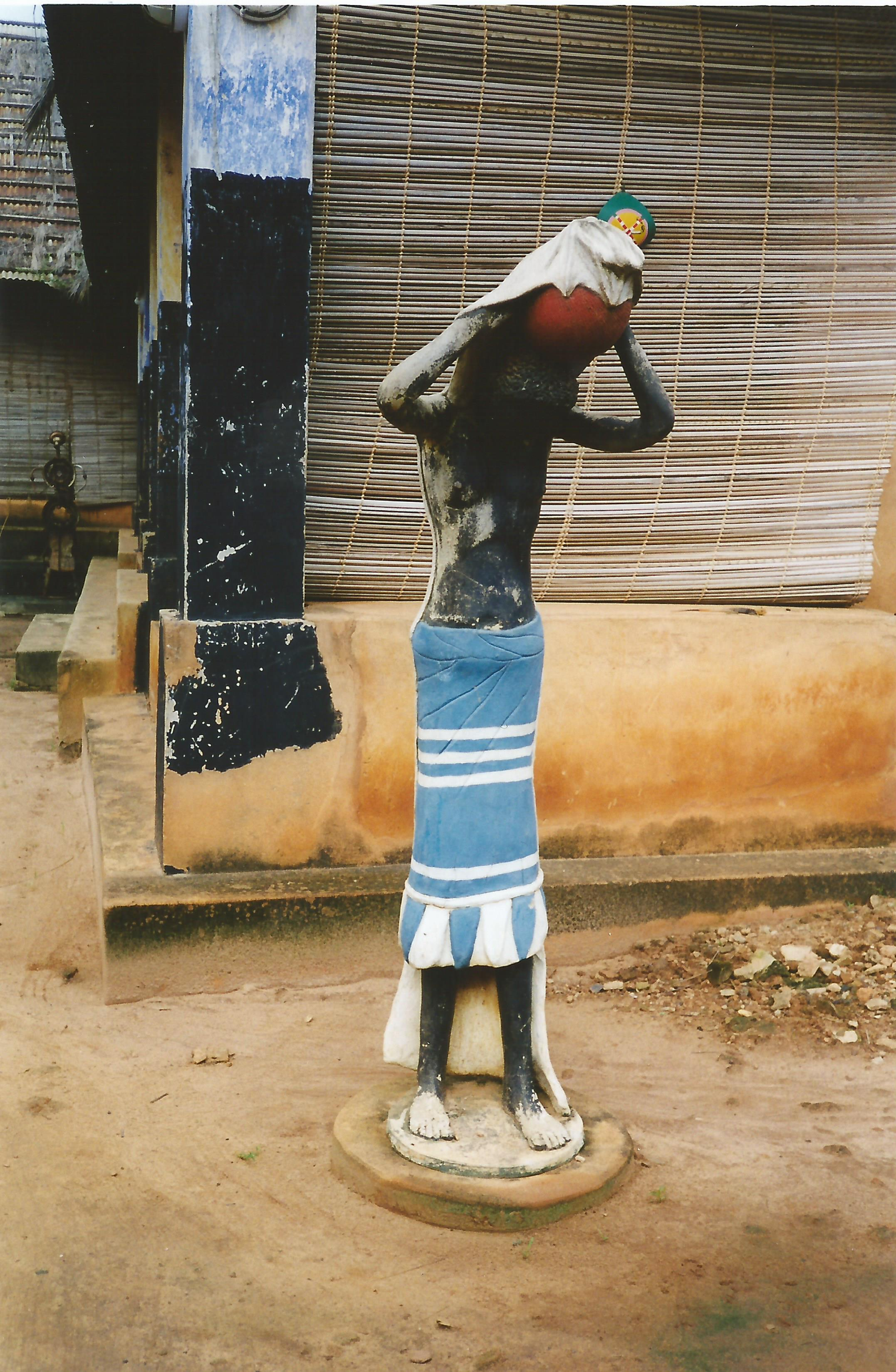
- Musée Honmè-Eté 1999
- Location: Porto-Novo, Benin
- Built for: King Toffa

The palace and the surrounding district was added to the UNESCO World Heritage Tentative List on October 31, 1996, in the Cultural category.

== Gallery ==
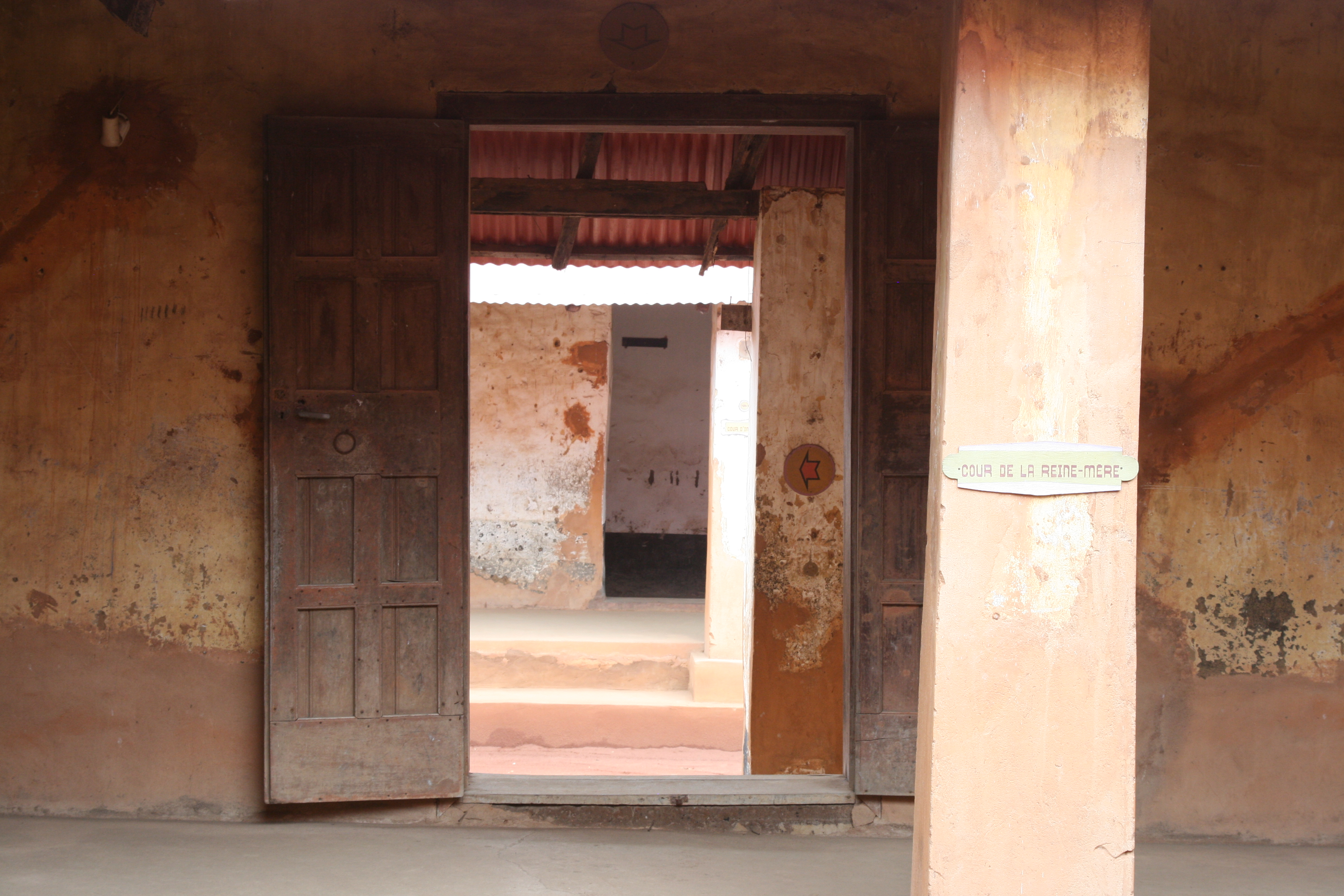
Inside the museum

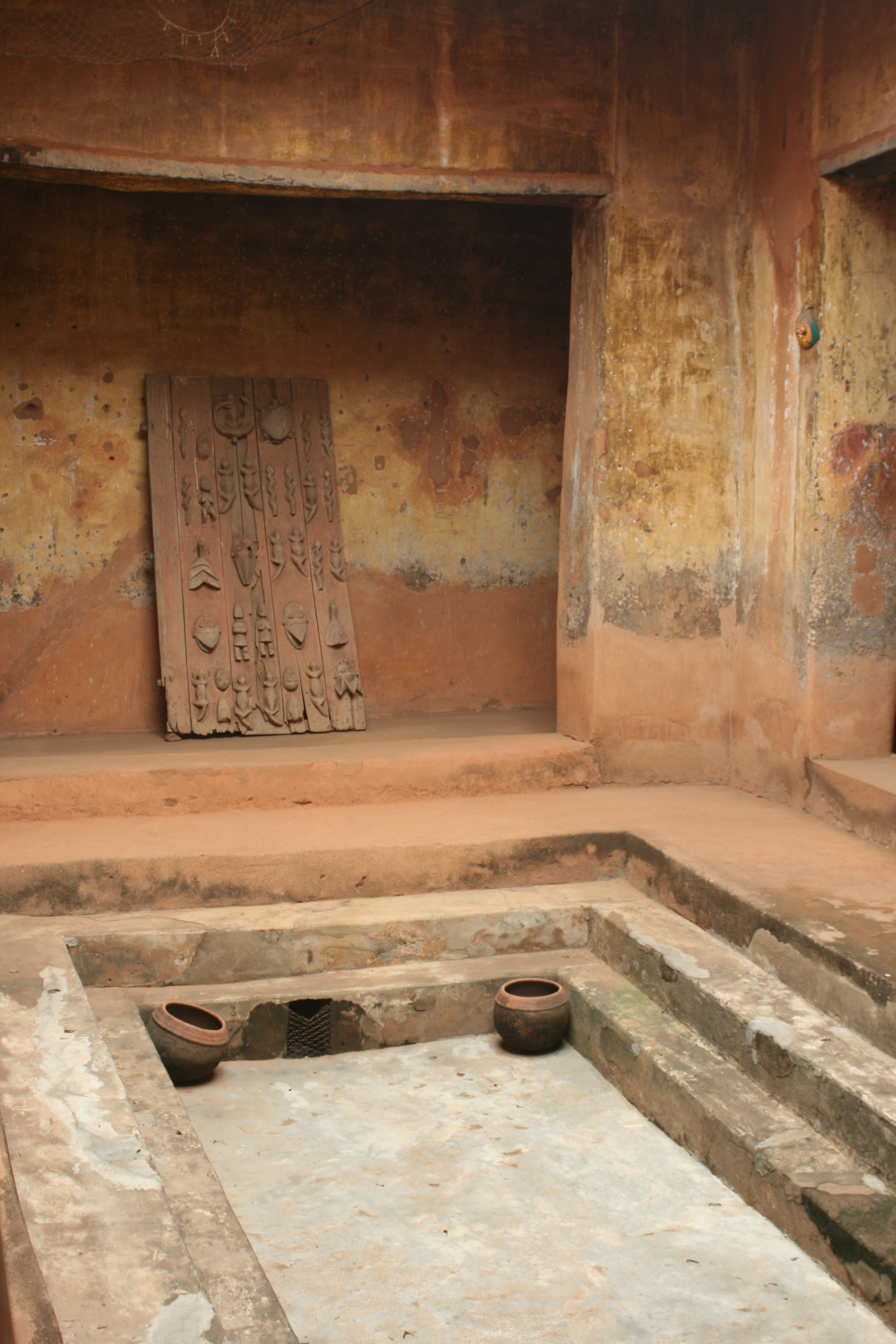
Inside the museum

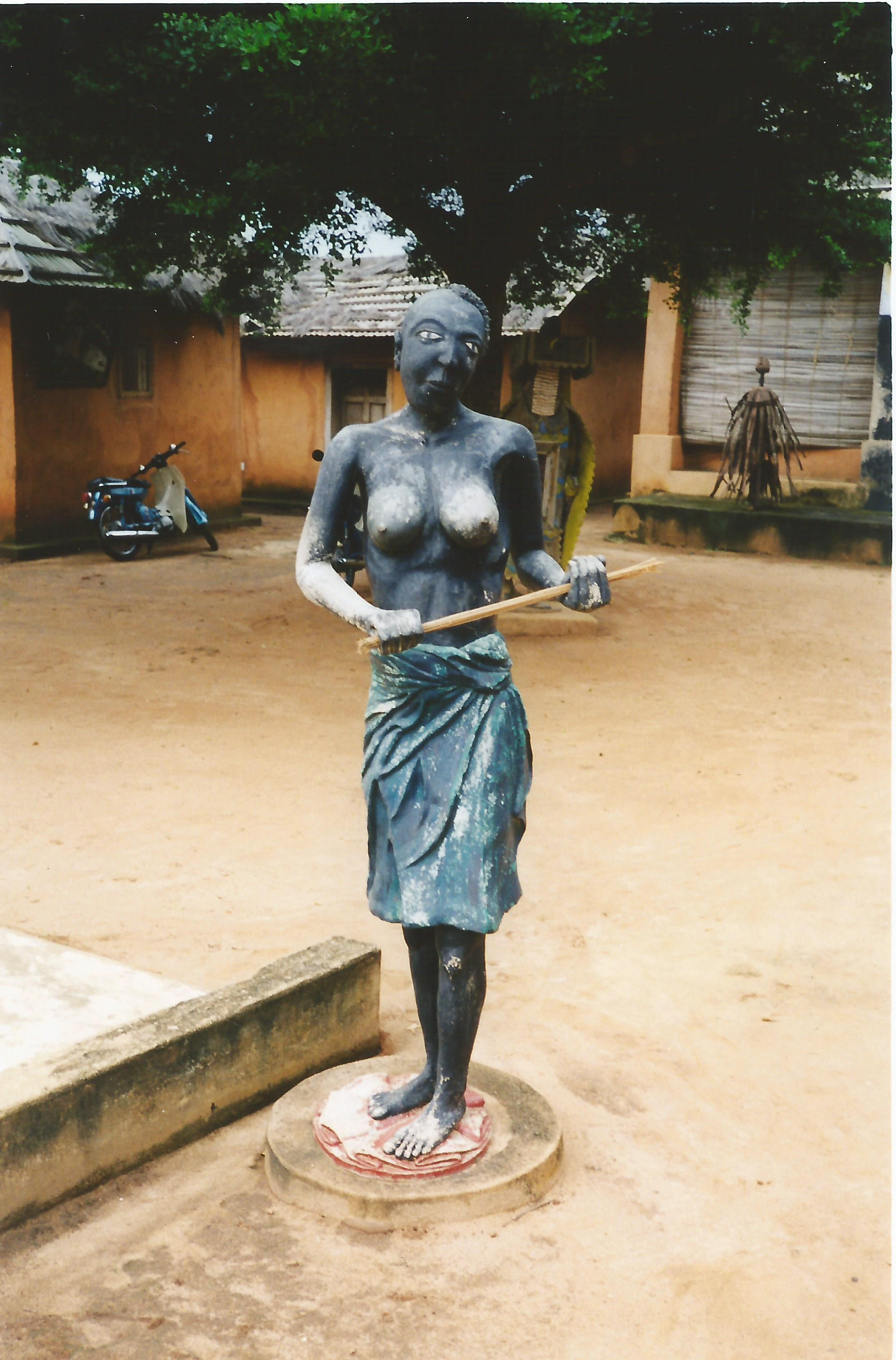
Musée Honmè-Eté, 1999

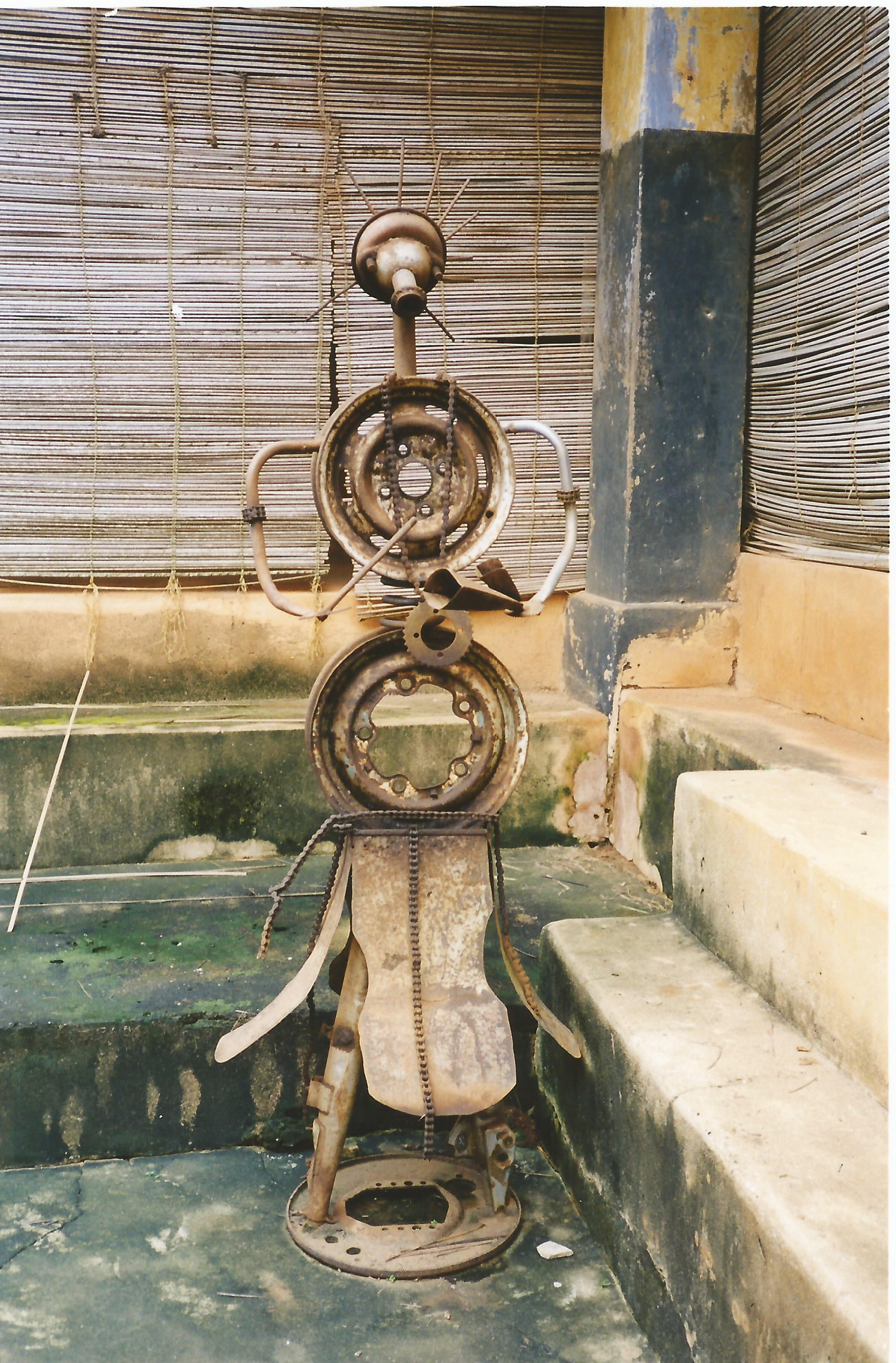
Musée Honmè-Eté, 1999
