= 5th arrondissement of Porto-Novo =

- Arrondissement
- Interactive map of 5th arrondissement of Porto-Novo
- Coordinates: 6.4706°N 2.6214°E
- Country: Benin
- Department: Ouémé Department
- Commune: Porto-Novo

Population (2002)
  - Total: 55,698
- Time zone: UTC+1 (WAT)

The 5th arrondissement is an arrondissement in the Ouémé department of Benin. It is an administrative division under the jurisdiction of the commune of Porto-Novo. According to the population census conducted by the Institut National de la Statistique Benin on February 15, 2002, the arrondissement had a total population of 55,698.
