= Porto-Novo =

Capital of Benin

Porto-Novo Àjàṣẹ́ (Yoruba) Xɔ̀gbónù (Fon) Ajashe, Hogbonu
- Capital city and commune
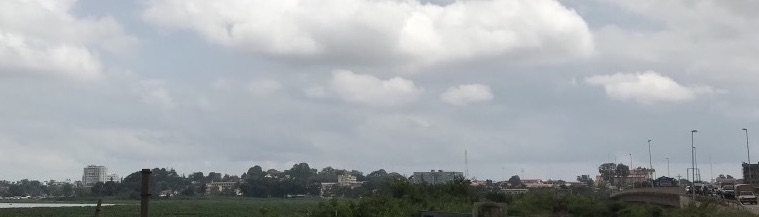
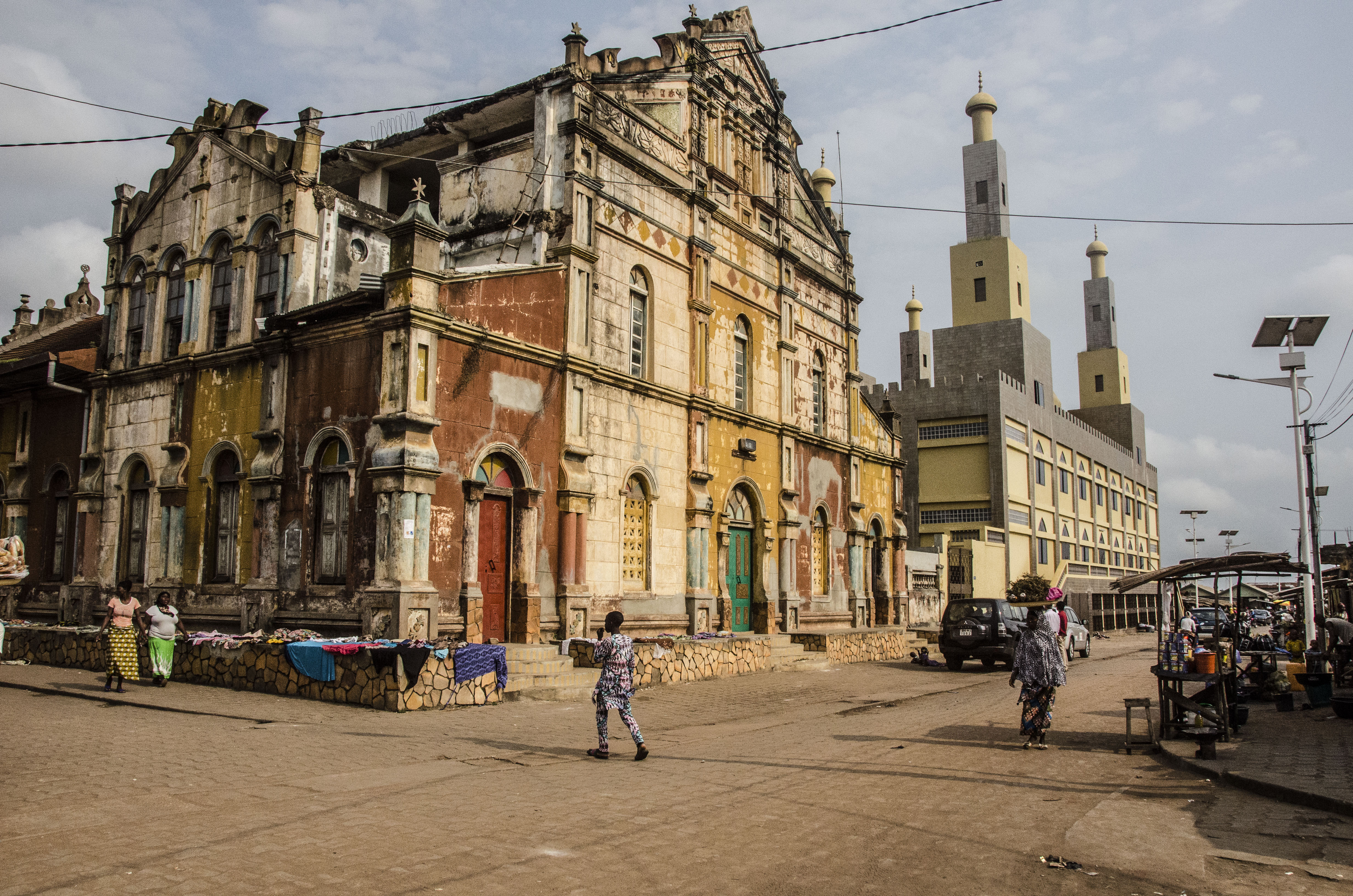
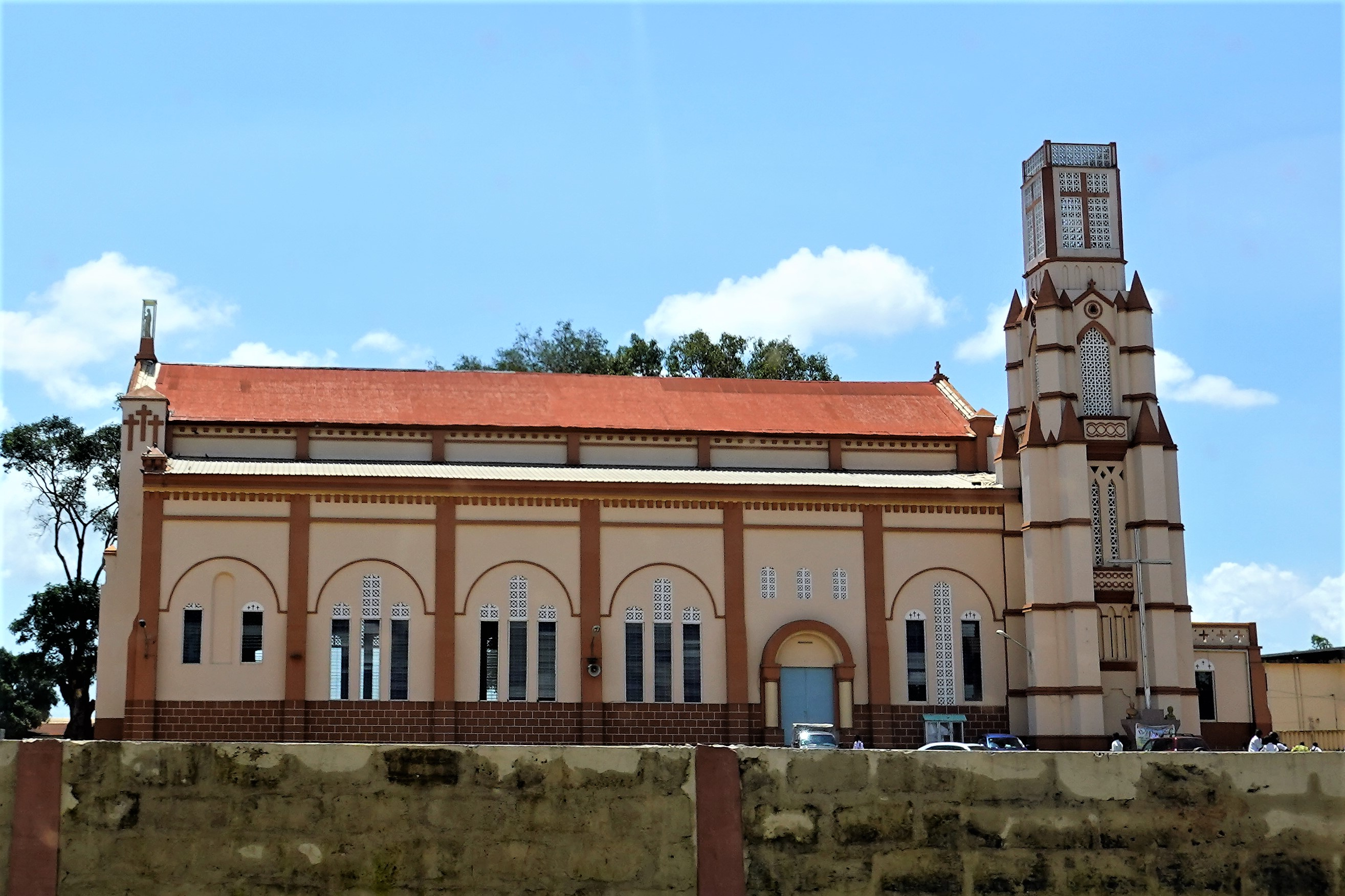
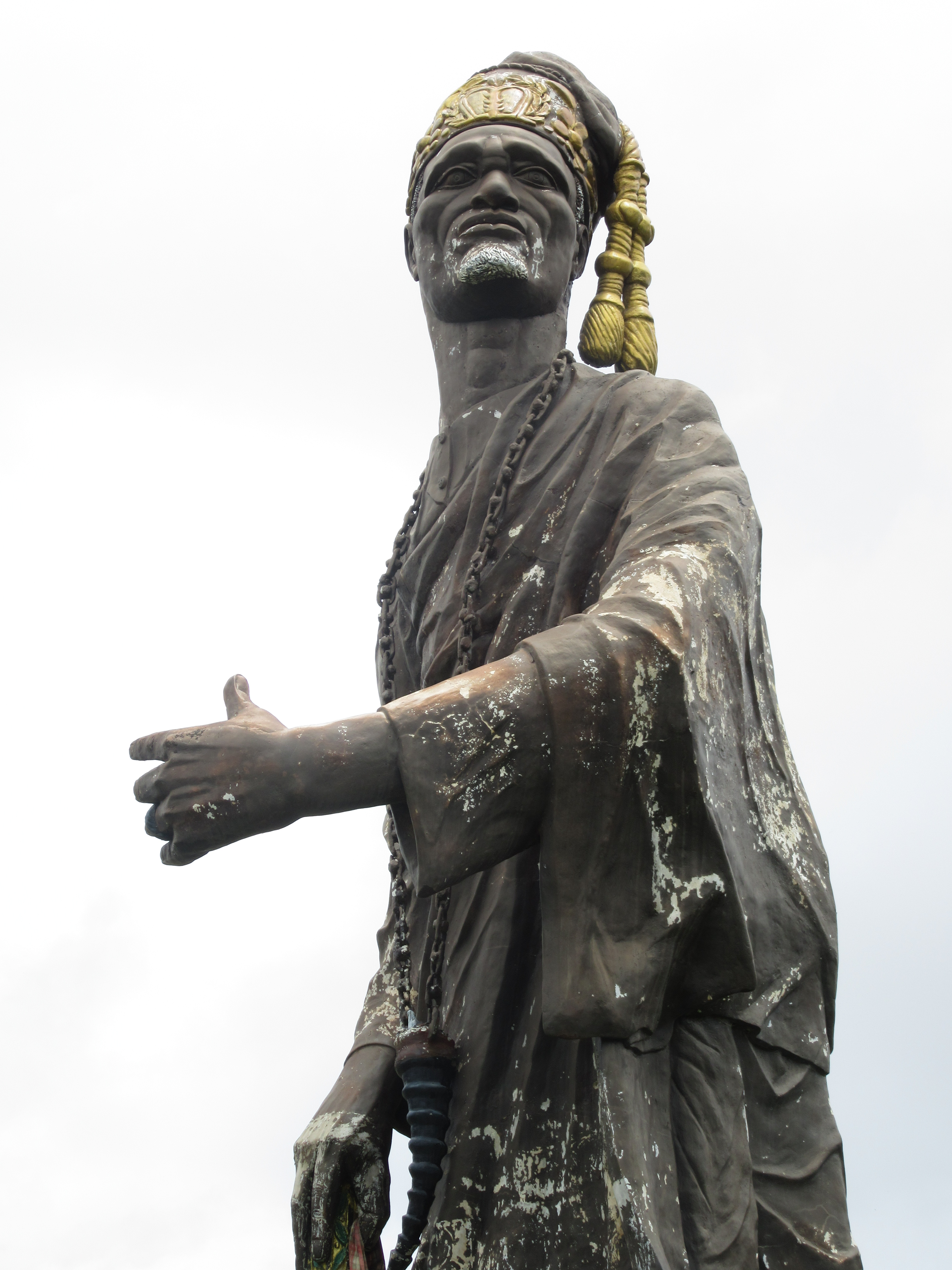
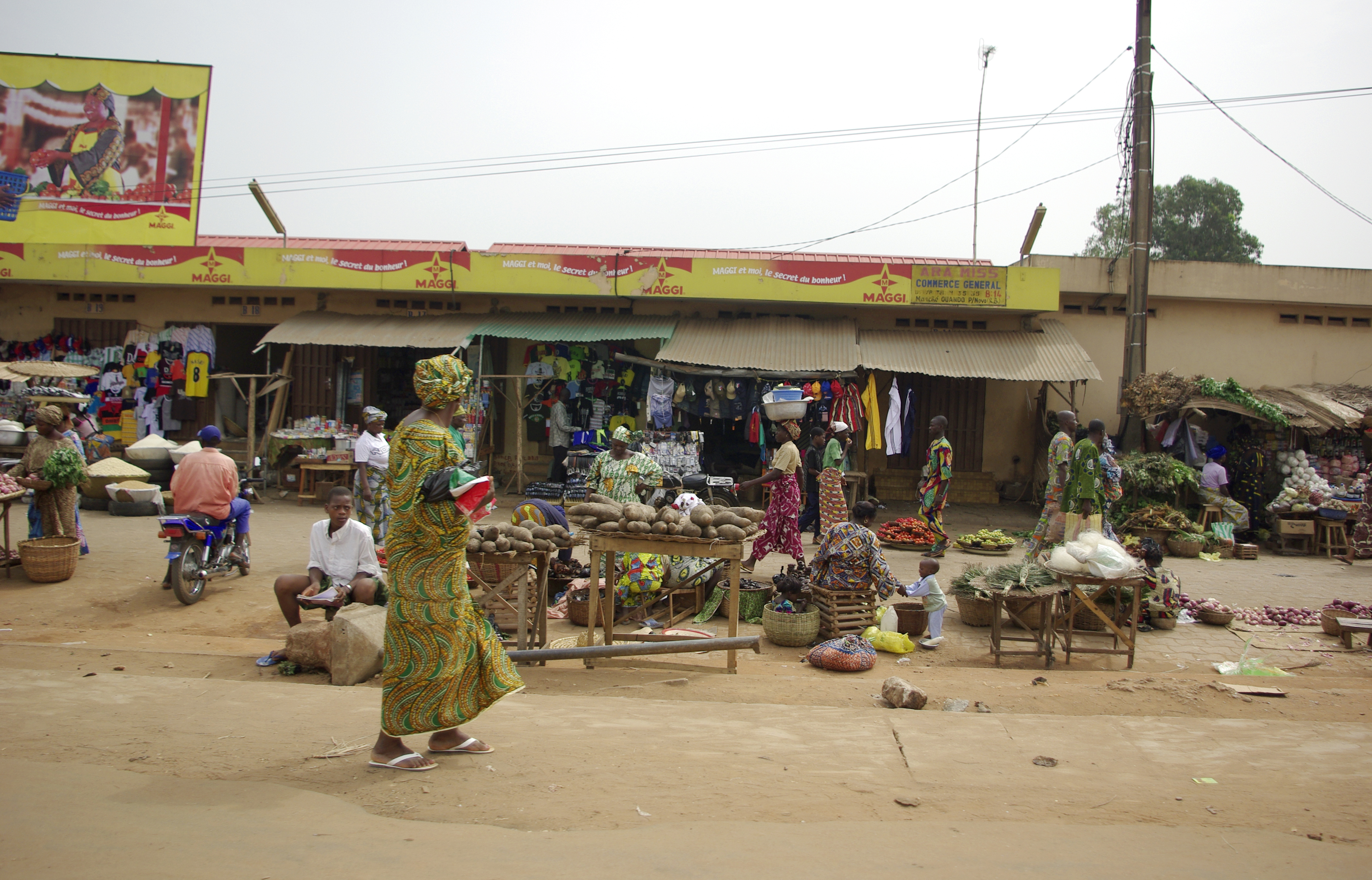
- Skyline of Porto-Novo Grande Mosquee Porto-Novo Porto-Novo Cathedral Statue of King Toffa I Ouando Market

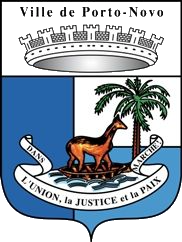
- Coat of arms

- Location within Benin Location within Africa
- Coordinates: 6°29′50″N 2°36′18″E
- Country: Benin
- Department: Ouémé
- Established: 16th century

Government
  - Mayor: Emmanuel Zossou

Area
  - Capital city and commune: 110 km^{2} (42 sq mi)
  - Metro: 110 km^{2} (42 sq mi)
- Elevation: 38 m (125 ft)

Population (2013)
  - Capital city and commune: 264,320
  - Rank: 2nd
  - Density: 2,400/km^{2} (6,200/sq mi)
- Time zone: UTC+01:00 (WAT)

Porto-Novo (Portuguese for 'New Port', pronounced [ˈpoɾtu ˈnovu]; French: [pɔʁtonɔvo]; Yoruba: Àjàṣẹ́; Fon: Xɔ̀gbónù; also known as Hogbonu and Ajashe) is the capital and second-largest city of Benin. The commune covers an area of 52 square kilometres (20 sq mi) and as of 2013 had a population of 264,320 people.

In 1863, following British bombardment, Porto-Novo accepted French protection, and by 1900, it became the capital of French Dahomey. After Benin's independence in 1960, Porto-Novo retained its status as the official capital, while Cotonou emerged as the economic and administrative hub.

Situated on an inlet of the Gulf of Guinea, in the southeastern portion of the country, the city was originally developed as a port for the transatlantic slave trade led by the Portuguese Empire. It is Benin's second-largest city, and although it is the official capital, where the national legislature sits, the larger city of Cotonou is the seat of government, where most of the government buildings are situated and government departments operate.

== Etymology ==
The name Porto-Novo is of Portuguese origin, literally meaning "New Port". It remains untranslated in French, the national language of Benin.

== History ==
Porto-Novo was once a tributary of the Yoruba Oyo Empire, which had offered it protection from the neighbouring Fon, who were expanding their influence and power in the region. Today, the Yoruba community in Porto-Novo remains one of the two original ethnic groups in the city. The city was originally called Ajashe (Àjàṣẹ́ in Yoruba orthography) by the Yorubas, and Hogbonu by the Gun.

Although historically the original inhabitants of the area were Yoruba-speaking, there seems to have been a wave of migration from the region of Allada further west in the 1600s, which brought Te-Agbalin (or Tê-Agbanlin) and his group to the region of Ajashe in the late 16th century.

In 1730, the Portuguese Eucaristo de Campos named the city "Porto-Novo" due to its resemblance to the city of Porto.

In 1861, the British, who were active in nearby Nigeria, bombarded the city, which caused the Kingdom of Porto-Novo to accept the French offer of protection in 1863. The neighbouring Kingdom of Dahomey objected to French involvement in the region and war broke out between the two states. In 1883, Porto-Novo was incorporated into the French "colony of Dahomey and its dependencies" and in 1900, it became Dahomey's capital city. As a consequence, the city's inhabitants, who had previously spoken local languages, began to adopt French alongside them, with the addition of French to the language repertoire of the city's inhabitants. Unlike the city's earlier Gun migrants, however, the French sought to impose their language in all spheres of life and completely stamp out the use and proliferation of indigenous languages.

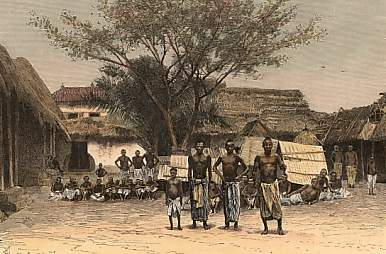
Porto-Novo (1887)

The kings of Porto-Novo continued to rule in the city, both officially and unofficially, until the death of the last king, Alohinto Gbeffa, in 1976. From 1908, the king held the title of Chef supérieur.

Many Afro-Brazilians settled in Porto-Novo following their return to Africa after emancipation in Brazil. Brazilian architecture and foods are important to the city's cultural life.

Under French colonial rule, flight across the new border to British-ruled Nigeria in order to avoid harsh taxation, military service and forced labour was common. Of note is the fact that the Nigeria-Benin southern border area arbitrarily cuts through contiguous areas of Yoruba- and Egun-speaking people. A combination of the aforementioned facts, coupled with the fact that the city itself lies within the sphere of Nigerian socioeconomic influence, has given Porto-Novo's residents a preference for some measure of bi-nationality or dual citizenship, with the necessary linguistic consequences; for example, Nigerian home video films in Yoruba with English subtitles have become popular in Porto-Novo and its suburbs.

== Seat of government ==
Benin's parliament (Assemblée nationale) is in Porto-Novo, the official capital, but most other government institutions, including the presidency, are located in Cotonou.

== Economy ==
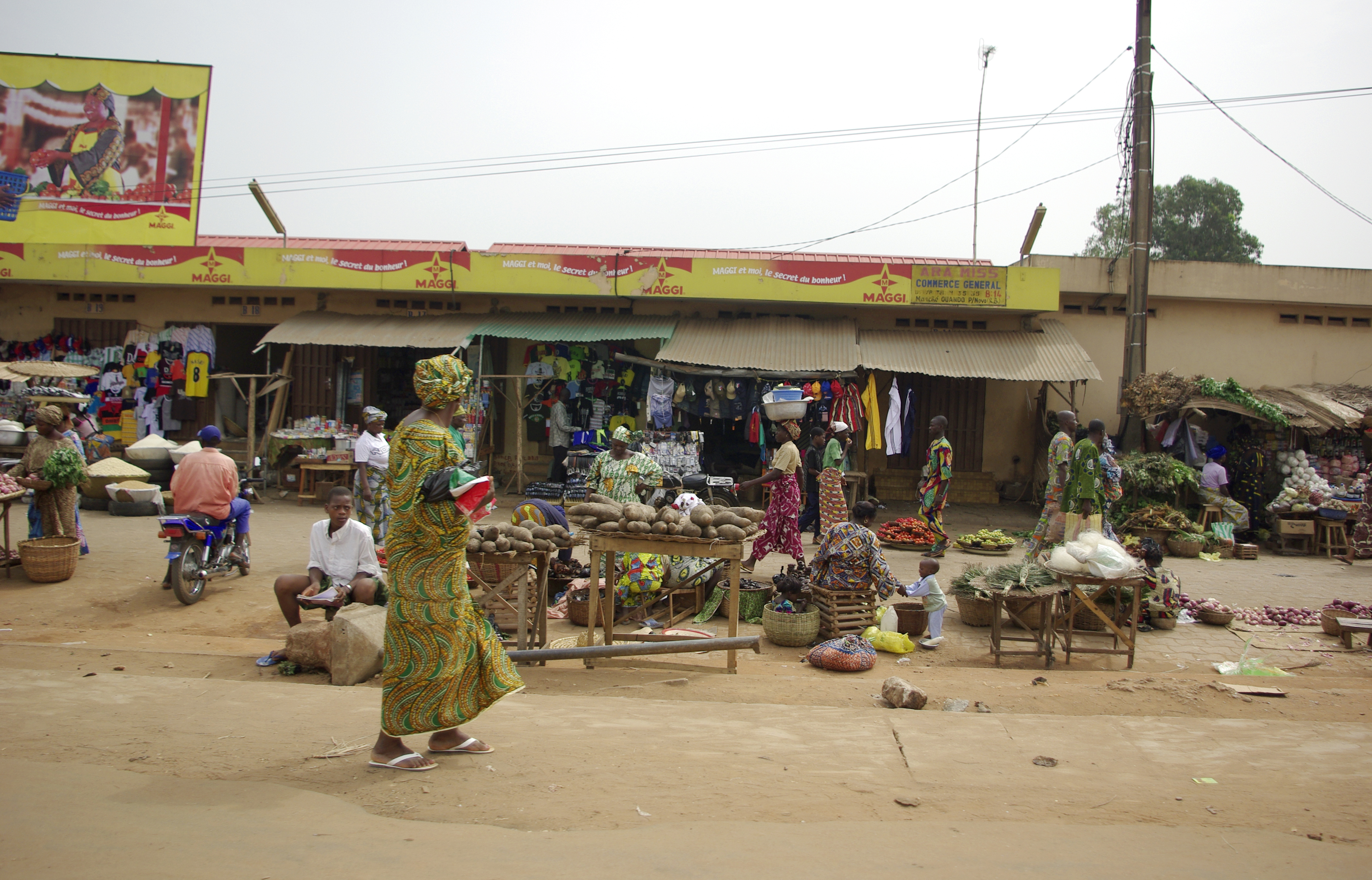
Ouando Market in Porto-Novo

The region around Porto-Novo produces palm oil, cotton and kapok. Petroleum was discovered off the coast of the city in 1968 and has become an important export since the 1990s. Porto-Novo has a cement factory. The city is home to a branch of the Banque Internationale du Bénin, a major bank in Benin, and the Ouando Market.

== Transport ==
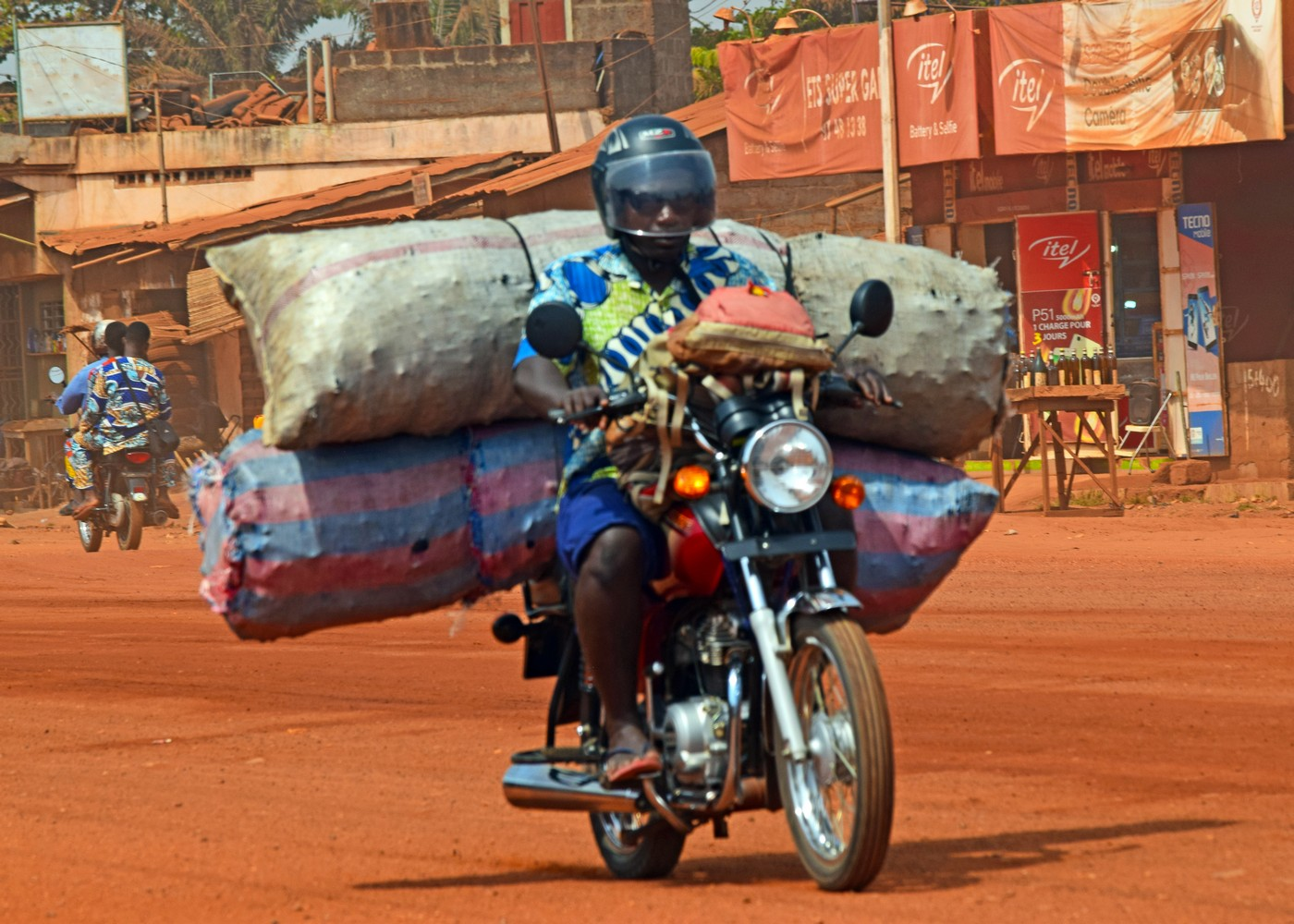
Charcoal transportation by motorcycle

Porto-Novo is served by an extension of the Bénirail train system. Privately owned motorcycle taxis known as zemijan are used throughout the city. The city is located about 40 kilometres (25 miles) away from Cotonou Airport, which has flights to major cities in West Africa and Europe.

== Demographics ==
Porto-Novo had an enumerated population of 264,320 in 2013. As of 2023, estimates suggest a population of around 300,000. The residents are mostly Yoruba and Gun people as well as people from other parts of the country, and from neighbouring Nigeria.

Population trend:

- 1979: 133,168 (census)
- 1992: 179,138 (census)
- 2002: 223,552 (census)
- 2013: 264,320 (census)

== Geography ==
Porto-Novo is located in the south of Benin, 13 km (8.1 mi) from the Atlantic Ocean, separated by a lagoon. Its altitude is approximately 38 m (125 ft) and it covers an area of 52 km².

It is located 30 km (19 mi) east of Cotonou, the economic capital, and 12 km (7.5 mi) from the Nigerian border to the east. Neighboring municipalities include Akpro-Missérété, Avrankou, and Adjarra to the north, Sèmè-Podji to the south, Adjarra to the east, and Aguégués to the west.

=== Climate ===
Porto-Novo has a tropical savanna climate (Köppen Aw) with consistently hot and humid conditions and two wet seasons: a long wet season from March to July and a shorter rain season in September and October. The city's location on the edge of the Dahomey Gap makes it much drier than would be expected so close to the equator, although it is less dry than Accra or Lomé.

Climate data for Porto-Novo
Month	Jan	Feb	Mar	Apr	May	Jun	Jul	Aug	Sep	Oct	Nov	Dec	Year
Daily mean °C (°F)	27 (81)	28 (82)	28 (82)	28 (82)	27 (81)	26 (79)	25 (77)	25 (77)	25 (77)	26 (79)	27 (81)	27 (81)	26 (79)
Average rainfall mm (inches)	23 (0.9)	34 (1.3)	86 (3.4)	127 (5.0)	215 (8.5)	370 (14.6)	129 (5.1)	44 (1.7)	89 (3.5)	140 (5.5)	52 (2.0)	16 (0.6)	1,325 (52.1)

== Administrative divisions ==
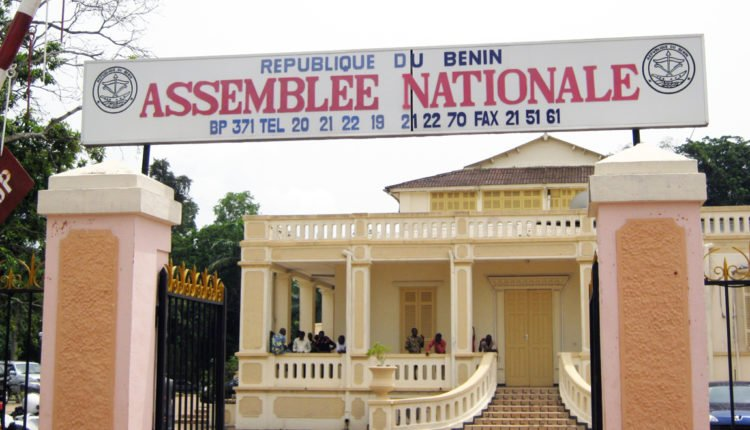
The National Assembly building

- 1st arrondissement
- 2nd arrondissement
- 3rd arrondissement
- 4th arrondissement
- 5th arrondissement

== Culture ==
- The Alexandre Sènou Adandé Ethnographic Museum contains a large collection of Yoruba masks, as well as items on the history of the city and of Benin.
- King Toffa's Palace (also known as the Musée Honmé and the Royal Palace), now a museum, shows what life was like for African royalty. The palace and the surrounding district was added to the UNESCO World Heritage Tentative List on October 31, 1996 in the Cultural category.
- Jardin Place Jean Bayol is a large plaza which contains a statue of the first King of Porto-Novo.
- The Da Silva Museum is a museum of Beninese history. It shows what life was like for the returning Afro-Brazilians.
- The palais de Gouverneur (governor's palace) is the home of the national legislature.
- The Isèbayé Foundation is a museum of Voodoo and Beninese history.

== Music ==
Adjogan music is endemic to Porto-Novo. The style of music is played on an alounloun, a stick with metallic rings attached which jingle in time with the beating of the stick. The alounloun is said to descend from the staff of office of King Te-Agdanlin and was traditionally played to honour the King and his ministers. The music is also played in the city's Roman Catholic churches, but the royal bird crest symbol has been replaced with a cross.

== Sports ==
The Stade Municipal and the Stade Charles de Gaulle are the largest football stadiums in the city.

== Places of worship ==
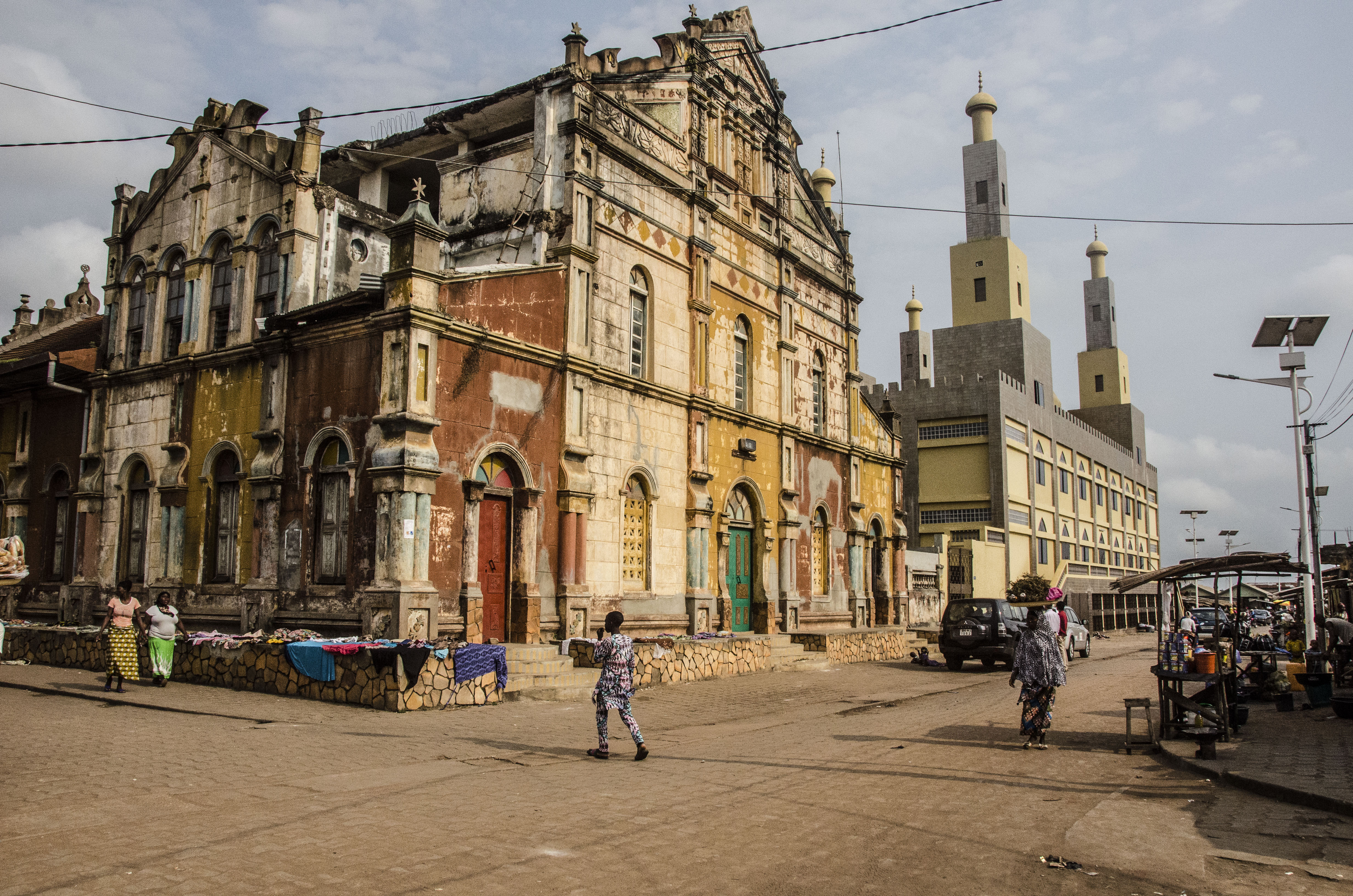
The Grande Mosquée in Porto-Novo. Its architecture was inspired by the churches of Salvador de Bahia.

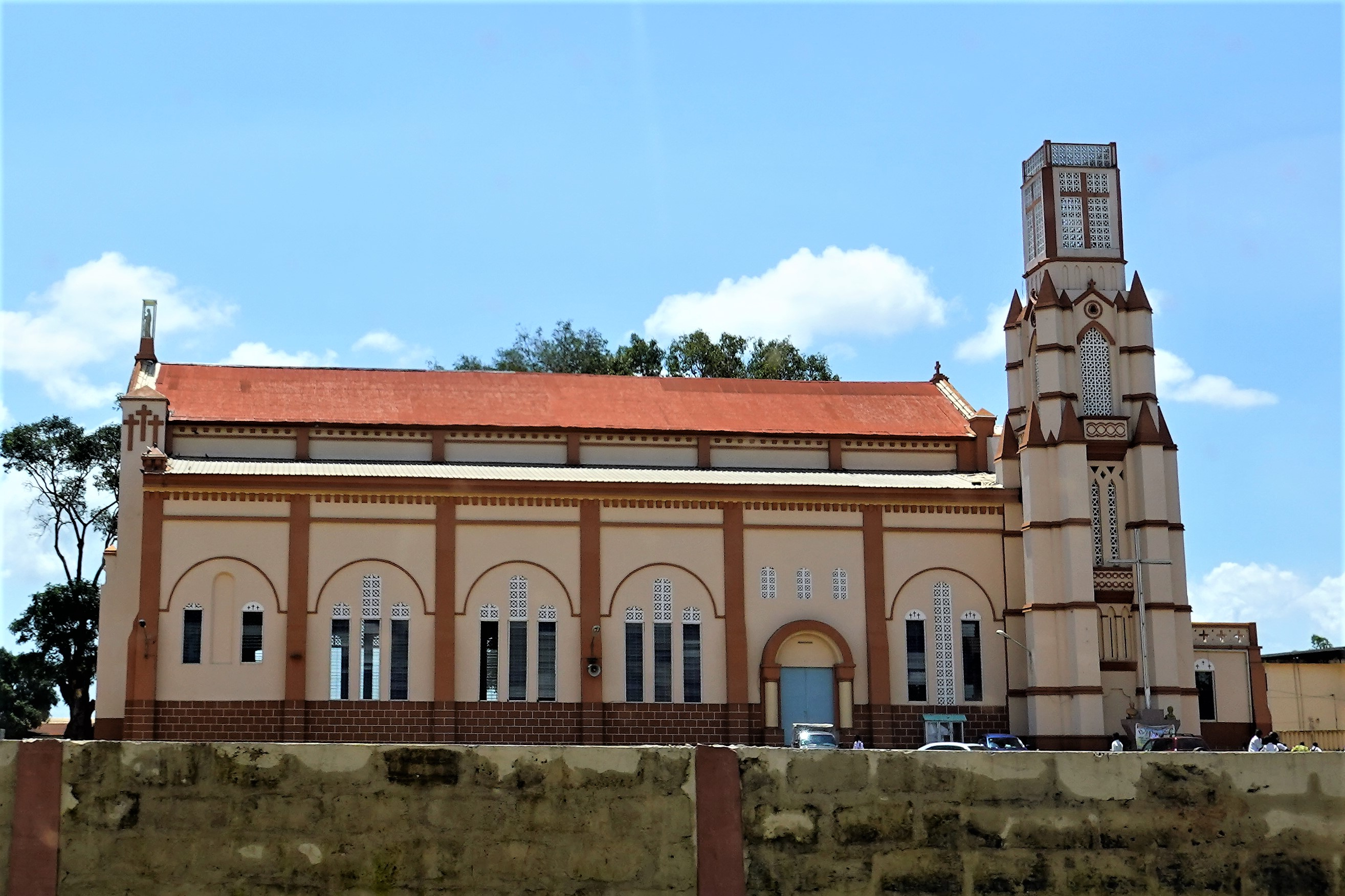
Porto-Novo Cathedral

Among the places of worship, Christian churches are predominant: Diocese of Porto-Novo (Catholic Church), Protestant Methodist Church in Benin (World Methodist Council), Celestial Church of Christ, Union of Baptist Churches of Benin (Baptist World Alliance), Living Faith Church Worldwide, Redeemed Christian Church of God, Assemblies of God. There are also Muslim mosques, most notably the Grand Mosque. There are also several Voodoo temples in the city.

=== Temple of Abessan and Zangbeto Shrine ===
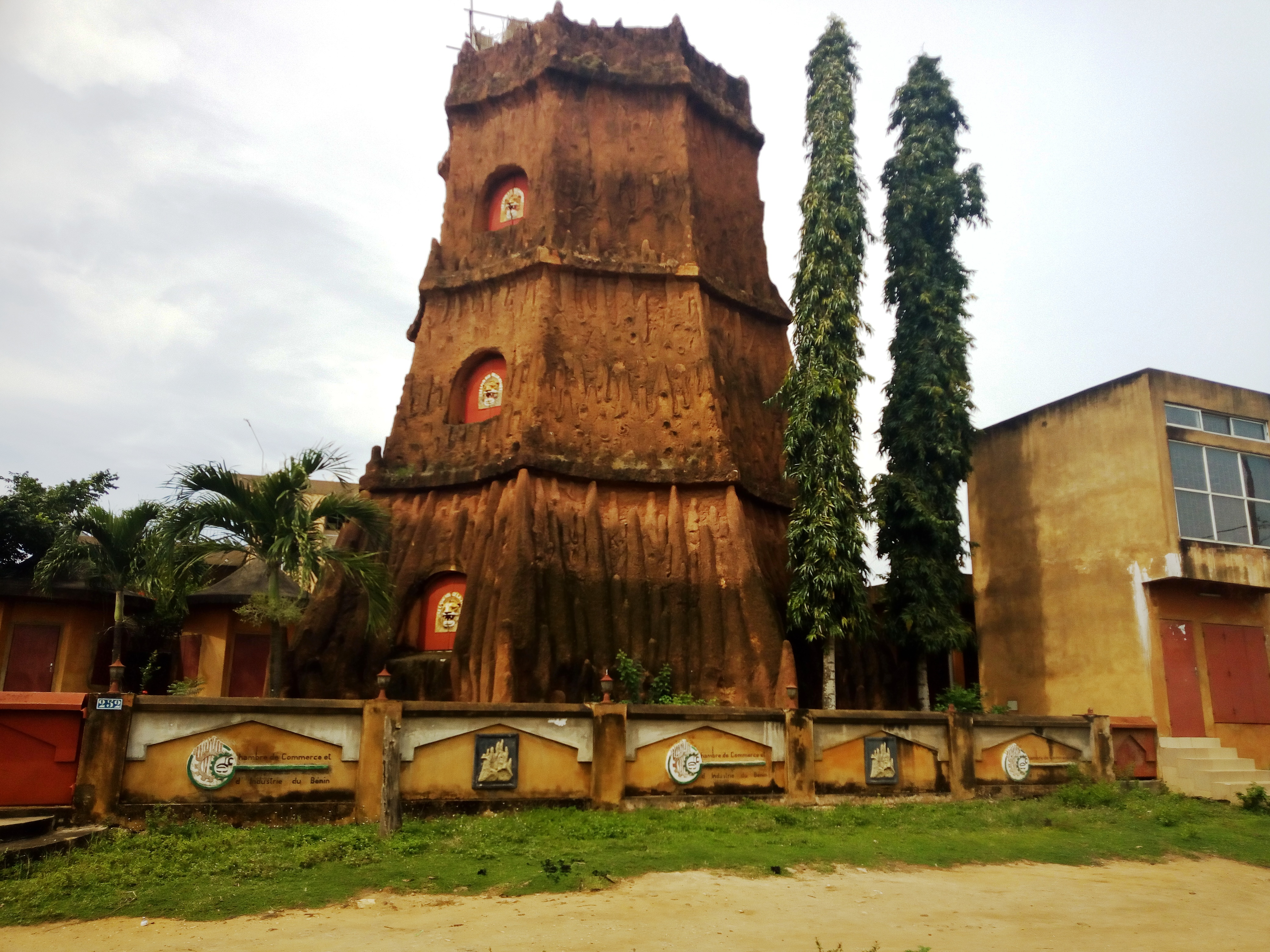
The new Temple of Abessan building, designed to resemble a termite mound and built in 2007

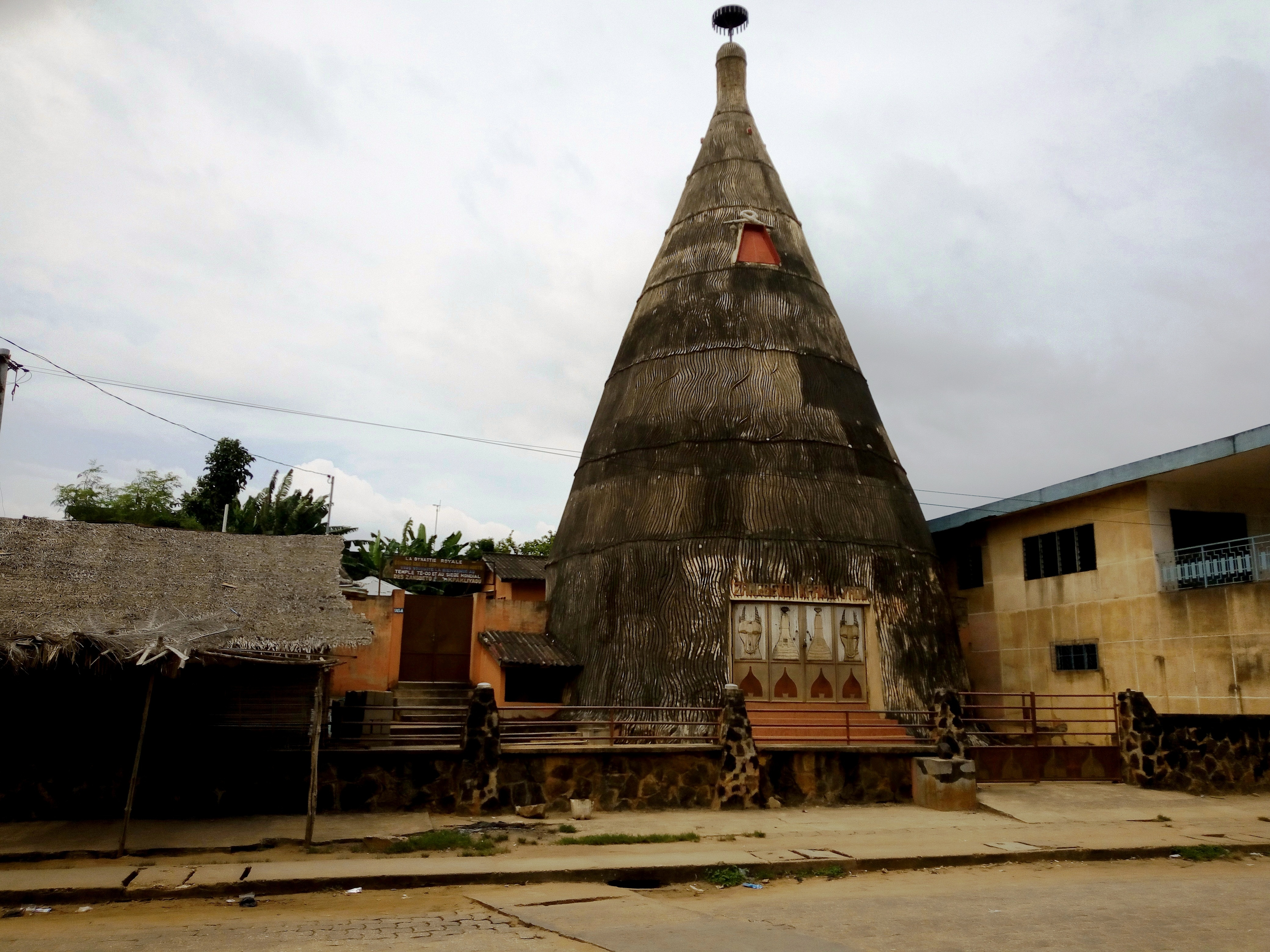
The Zangbeto Shrine, at the national headquarters of the Zangbeto, built in 2007

In 2007, as part of the development of tourist attractions in the city, two new monumental buildings related to Voodoo were constructed, financed by the Benin Chamber of Commerce (CCB) and designed by an architectural firm. The first of these was a new temple building dedicated to the god Abessan (or Avessan) consisting of a 10-metre-tall tower designed to resemble a termite mound. This design was inspired by the mythical emergence of Abessan from a termite mound. This modern building is not a reconstruction of an earlier temple but rather a new construction and design inspired by the mythical origin of Abessan. The current structure replaced an earlier temple building which was a small circular hut. The second was a new building for the national headquarters of the Zangbeto, which is designed to resemble a large cone made of raffia and represents the figure of Kpakliyaho (the ancestor of the Zangbeto). The construction of these new monuments was part of the CCB's plan to make Porto-Novo the "hub of world tourism for the worship of the Vodun religion". These new buildings with their original designs have been strongly criticized by some heritage conservationists.

== Notable people ==
- Alexis Adandé, archaeologist
- Grace Aboh Dotou, teacher, entrepreneur and activist born in Porto-Novo
- Anicet Adjamossi, footballer.
- Géraldine Faladé, journalist.
- Kamarou Fassassi, politician.
- Romuald Hazoume, artist
- Samuel Oshoffa, who founded the Celestial Church of Christ.
- Claudine Talon, first lady of Benin (since 2016)
- Marc Tovalou Quenum, lawyer, writer and pan-Africanist.
- Paulin Soumanou Vieyra, director and author
- Baba Yabo, comedian
- Gaston Zossou, politician

== See also ==
- Beninois Yoruba
