= Alexandre Sènou Adandé Ethnographic Museum =

Ethnographic museum in Benin

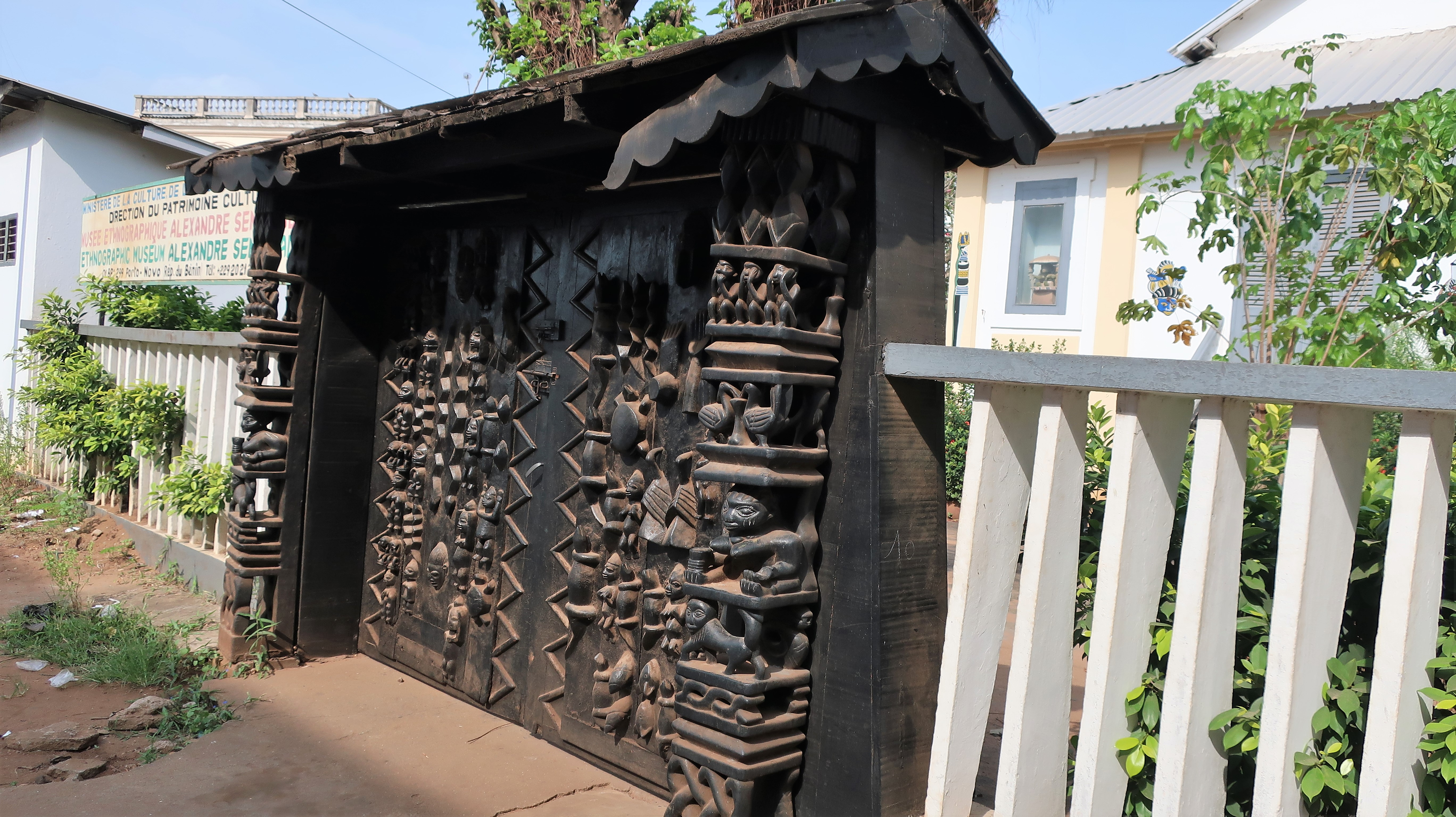
- Established: 1966, 1922
- Location: Porto-Novo, Porto-Novo, Benin
- Coordinates: 6°28′24″N 2°37′03″E
- Type: museum
- Collection size: 1,280 unit
- Location of Alexandre Sènou Adandé Ethnographic Museum

The Alexandre Sènou Adandé Ethnographic Museum is a museum in Porto-Novo, Benin. It was established in 1957 by the Dahomey Institute. It is operated by Alexandre Sènou Adandé, a noted ethnologist, who was chief archivist and librarian at the Institut Fondamental d'Afrique Noire of Dakar from 1948 to 1960.

== Bibliography ==
- Tchibozo, Romuald (2019). « Héritier des traditions de Xogbonou et intellectuel de son temps : une biographie d’Alexandre Sènou Adandé », in BEROSE - International Encyclopaedia of the Histories of Anthropology, Paris.
