= Yoruba people =

Ethnic group in West Africa

Yoruba Ìran Yorùbá

Total population
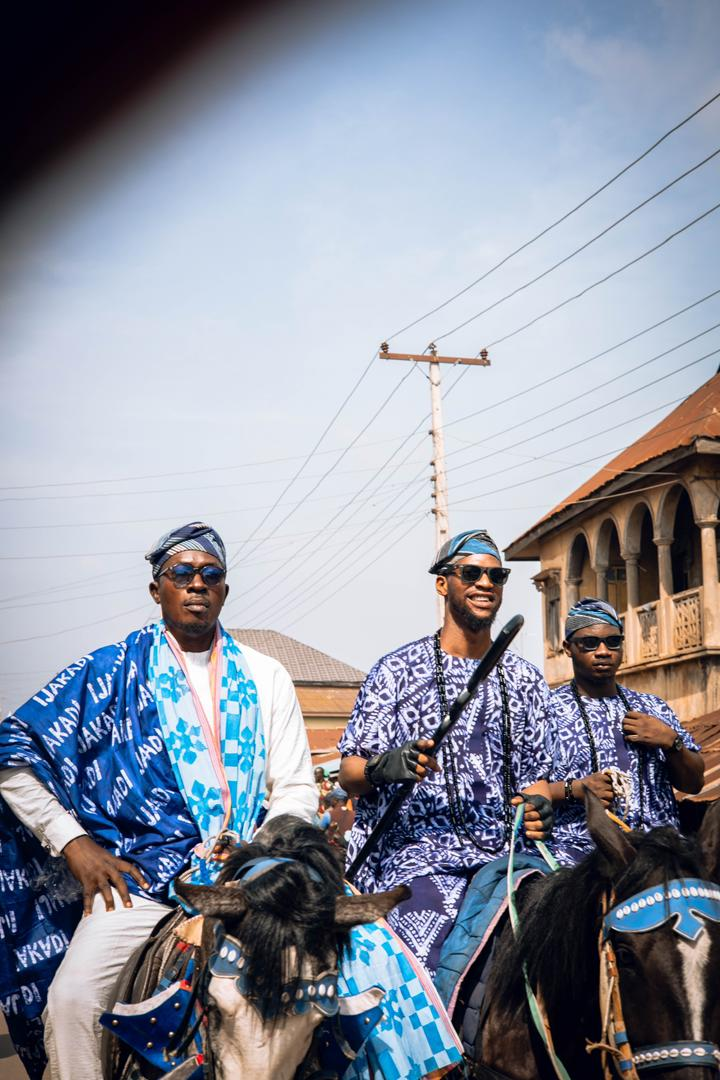
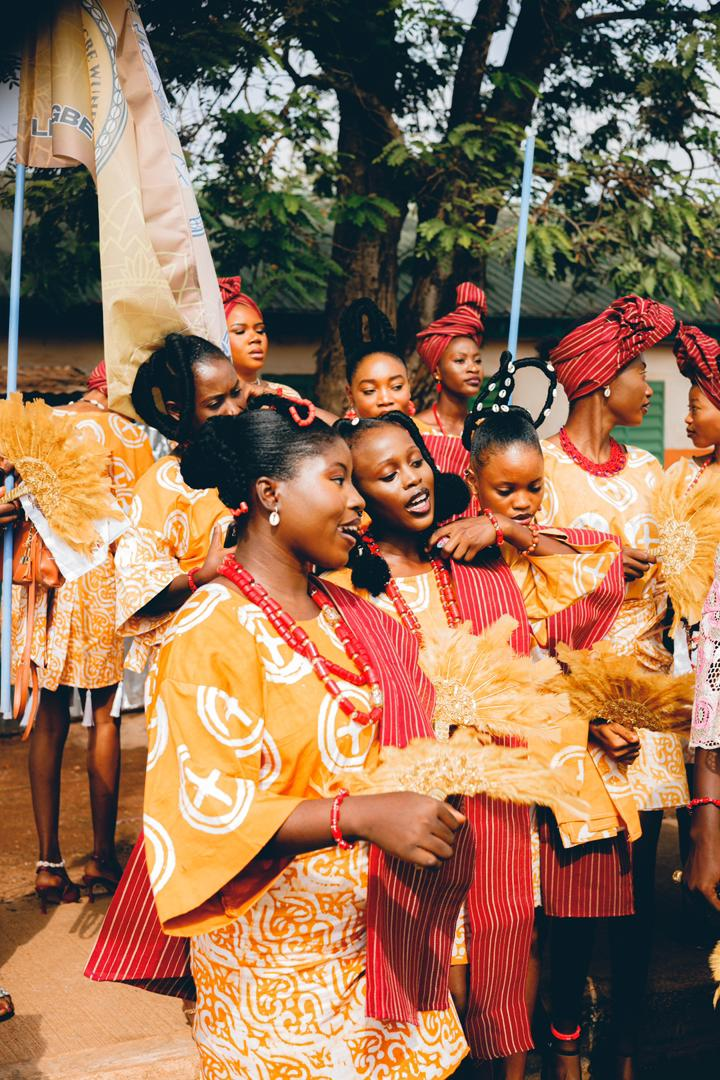
- c. ≈ 53,224,000 (2025) (Note: Population figures not inclusive of pre-20th century diasporic communities who trace full or partial Yoruba heritage) Groups of Yoruba men and women from Offa.

Regions with significant populations
- Nigeria: 42,600,000 (2020)
- Benin: 1,600,000
- Ghana: 425,600
- Togo: 285,000 (2014)
- United States: 248,684 (2024) (Note: This figure only accounts for people who indicate speaking Yoruba as the primary language of the home and not the total number of people with Yoruba ancestry.)
- Ivory Coast: 115,000 (2017)
- Niger: 80,700 (2021)
- Canada: 42,075 (2021) (Note: Population figures based on those who indicate Yoruba as their ethnic or cultural origin in the Canadian census.)
- Sierra Leone: 16,578 (2022)
- Ireland: 10,100 (2011)
- Gambia: 9,224 (2024)
- Australia: 4,020 (2021)
- Finland: 1,538 (2023)

Languages
- Yoruba and Yoruboid languages • English (Nigeria) • French (Benin, Togo)

Religion
- Christianity; Islam; Yoruba religion

Related ethnic groups
- (Yoruboid); Igala · Itsekiri · · Olukumi · (Gbe); Aja · Ewe · Fon · Mahi · Ogu (Kwa); Adele · Akebu · Anii · Ga · Kposo (Nupoid); Ebira · Nupe (Edoid); Afemai · Bini · Esan · Urhobo (Gur); Bariba · Tem (Diaspora); Aku · African Americans · Afro-Brazilians · Afro-Caribbean people · Nagos · Tabom.

- Person: Ọmọ Yorùbá
- People: Ìran Yorùbá
- Language: Èdè Yorùbá
- Country: Ilẹ̀ Yorùbá

The Yoruba people (/ˈjɒrʊbə/ YORR-uub-ə; Yoruba: Ìran Yorùbá, Ọmọ Odùduwà, Ọmọ Káàárọ̀-oòjíire) are a West African ethnic group who inhabit parts of Nigeria, Benin, and Togo, a region collectively called Yorubaland. The Yoruba constitute more than 50 million people in Africa and over a million outside the continent, and bear further representation among the African diaspora in countries like Brazil and Cuba, and in the Caribbean. The vast majority of Yoruba live in Nigeria where they make up 20.7% of the country's population according to Ethnologue estimates, making them one of the largest ethnic groups in Africa. Most Yoruba people speak the Yoruba language, which is the Niger–Congo language with the largest number of native or L1 speakers.

== Etymology ==
The oldest known textual reference to the name Yoruba is found in an essay (titled – Mi'rāj al-Ṣu'ūd) from a manuscript written by the Berber jurist Ahmed Baba in the year 1614. The original manuscript is preserved in the Ahmed Baba Institute of the Mamma Haidara Library in Timbuktu while a digital copy is at the World Digital Library. Mi'rāj al-Ṣu'ūd provides one of the earliest known ideas about the ethnic composition of the West African interior. The relevant section of the essay which lists the Yoruba group alongside nine others in the region as translated by John Hunwick and Fatima Harrak for the Institute of African Studies Rabat, reads:

We will add another rule for you, that is that whoever now comes to you from among the group called Mossi, or Gurma, or Bussa, or Borgu, or Dagomba, or Kotokoli, or Yoruba, or Tombo, or Bobo, or K.rmu – all of these are unbelievers remaining in their unbelief until now. Similarly Kumbe except for a few people of Hombori

This early 1600s reference implies that the name Yoruba was already in popular demotic use as far back as at least the 1500s. Regarding the source and derivation of this name, guesses were posited by various foreign sociologists of external sources. These include; Ya'rub (son of Canaanite, Joktan) by Caliph Muhammed Bello of Sokoto, Goru Ba by T.J Bowen, or Yolla Ba (Mande word for the Niger river) etc. These guesses suffer a lack of support by many locals for being alien to (and unfounded in) the traditions of the Yorubas themselves. In his work Abeokuta and the Camaroons Mountains c.1863 the English ethnologist Richard F. Burton reports of an account in 1861, noting that the name "Yoruba" derives from Ori Obba, i.e. -The Head King. It was applied ex-situ originally in reference to the Yoruba sociolinguistic group as a whole. Centuries later however, it became associated with the Ọ̀yọ́ subgroup when this subgroup rose to attain imperial status, particularly at its apogee (c.1650 – c.1750) until in the mid-1800s when this trend was reversed back to the original context.

== Names ==
The name Yoruba is the most well known ethnonym for the group of people that trace a common origin to Ife, but synonymous terms have been recorded in history such as Nago/Anago, Lucumi/Olukumi and Aku/Oku.

Some Exonyms the Yoruba are known by across West Africa include; Alata in southern Ghana, Eyagi in Nupe which produced descendant terms such as Ayagi (the pre-modern Hausa word for the Yoruba people) and Iyaji in Igala.

The Yoruba people also refer to themselves by the epithet "Ọmọ Káàárọ̀-oòjíire", literally meaning, "The People who ask 'Good morning, did you wake up well?". This is in reference to the mode of greeting associated with Yoruba culture. Through parts of coastal West Africa where Yorubas can be found, they have carried the culture of lauding one another with greetings applicable in different situations along with them. Another epithet used is, "Ọmọ Oòduà", meaning "The Children of Oduduwa", referencing the semi-legendary Yoruba king.

== History ==
The Yoruba people emerged largely in situ, from the earlier Mesolithic Volta-Niger populations, by the 1st millennium BCE. By the 5th century BCE, a powerful city-state existed in Ile-Ife, one of the earliest in what is now Nigeria. This city's oral traditions link to figures such as Oduduwa and Obatala, and it would become the heart of the Ife Empire, the first empire in Yoruba history. The Ife Empire flourished between 1200 and 1420 CE, had influence across much of what is now southwestern Nigeria, eastern Benin and Togo.

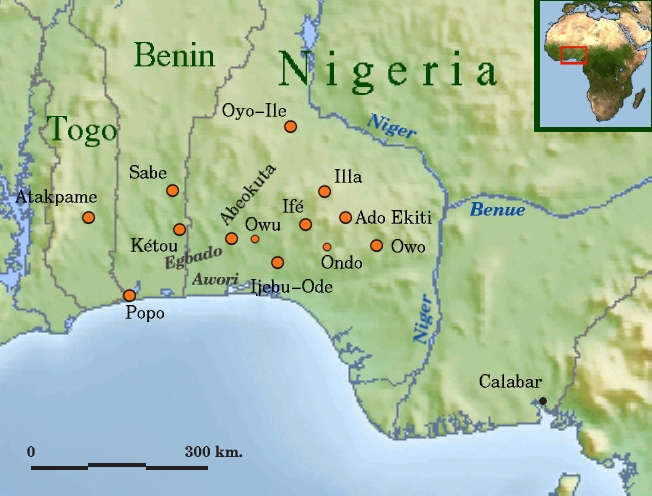
Some Yoruba cities of the Middle Ages

Oral history recorded under the Oyo Empire derives the Yoruba as an ethnic group from the population of the City State of Ile-Ife. Ile-Ife, as the capital of the former empire, held a prominent position in Yoruba history. The Yoruba were the dominant cultural force in southwestern and west-central Nigeria as far back as the 11th century.

The Yoruba people were historically one of the most urban ethnic groups in Africa. They usually settled in a concentric nuclear pattern. Before colonialism, the Yoruba existed as a series of structured large kingdoms and states with an urban capital core (Olú Ìlú) sharing filial relations with one another. These urban capitals were built to encapsulate the palace of the Oba (king) and most of the kingdom's central institutions such as the premier market (Ọjà Ọba) and several temples. Many of these city-states had extensive defence structures such as moats and trenches (Iyàrà) such as those of the Ife Empire and the better known Eredo Sungbo that completely surrounded the nascent Ijebu Kingdom, while others had tall walls and ramparts such as Oyo ile, capital of the Oyo empire, which reportedly had an outer wall over 20 feet high with 10 gates. These cities were some of the most populated in Africa. Archaeological findings indicate that Òyó-Ilé or Katunga, capital of the Oyo empire (fl. between the 16th and 19th centuries CE), had more than 100,000 inhabitants. For a long time, the largest city Ibadan expanded rapidly in the 1800s. Today, Lagos (Yoruba: Èkó) has become the largest Yoruba city and the largest on the continent, displacing Ibadan to second place with a populace of over 20 million.

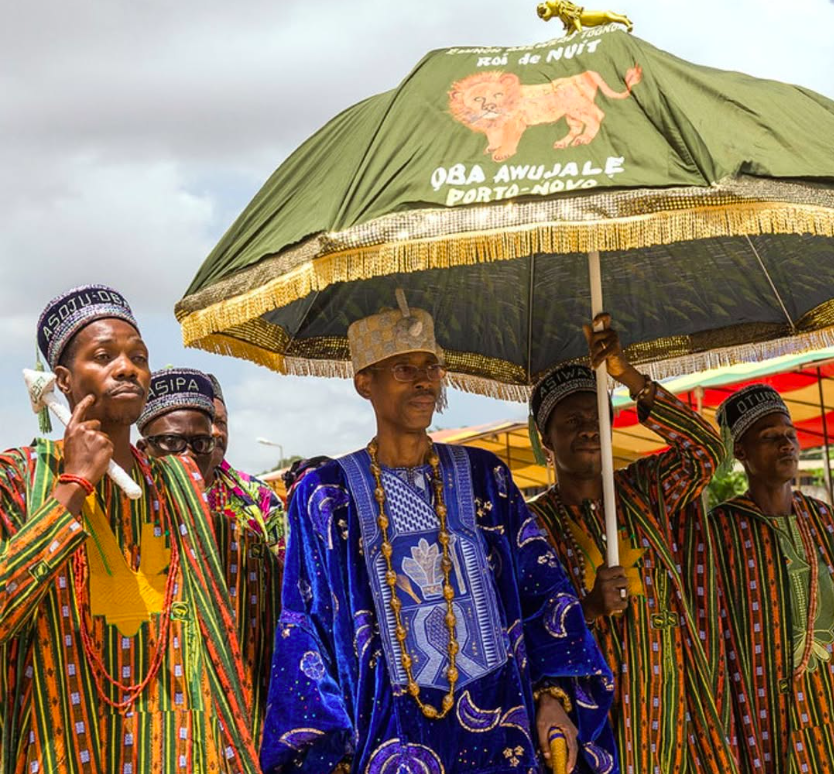
A traditional King of Porto-Novo, Benin, walking under an umbrella with his entourage

Archaeologically, the settlement of Ile-Ife showed features of urbanism in the 12th–14th-century era. This period coincided with the peak of the Ife Empire, when Ile-Ife grew into one of West Africa's largest cities. Around 1300 CE, glass bead production reached industrial scale and floors were paved with potsherds and stones. Artists at Ile-Ife developed a refined and naturalistic sculptural tradition in terracotta, stone, brass and bronze. Many of those traditions appear to have been created under the patronage of King Obalufon II, who today is identified as the Yoruba patron deity of brass casting, weaving and regalia. The Yoruba regard Ile-Ife as the place of origin of human civilization. Its urban phase represented a peak of political centralization in the 14th century, and is commonly called a "golden age" of Ife. Ife is still considered the Yoruba spiritual homeland. Its dynasty remains intact today. The oba or ruler of Ile-Ife is called the Ooni of Ife.

=== Oyo, Ile-Ife and Lagos ===
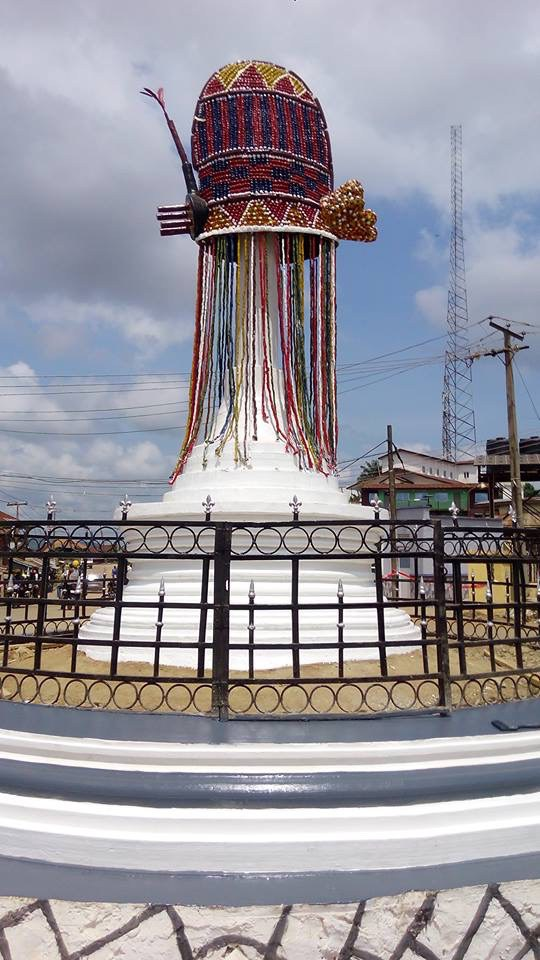
The Ade-Are crown in Ile Ife

In the 15th century, the Oyo Empire surpassed Ile-Ife as the dominant military and political power in Yorubaland.

In the 18th century, the Empire under the oba Alaafin of Oyo, indirectly participated in the African slave trade. The Yoruba often raided neighbouring populations and practiced a system locally known as Ìwòfà, the Yoruba version of indentured servitude.

Most of the city states were controlled by obas (kings with various titles) and councils. The councils were made up of oloye, recognized leaders of royal, noble and, often, even common descent, who joined them in ruling through guilds and cults. The power of the king versus the councils differed between states. Oyo's kings had almost total control, but were nevertheless constantly checked by the Oyo Mesi led by the Basọrun, while the Ijebu city-states had senatorial councils with more influence than the Ọba, here called the Awujale of Ijebuland.

In recent decades, Lagos rose as the most prominent city of the Yoruba people, a Yoruba cultural and economic power. Noteworthy among the developments of Lagos were uniquely styled architecture introduced by returning Yoruba communities from Brazil and Cuba, known in Yoruba as Amaros/Agudas.

Yoruba settlements are often described as primarily one or more of the main social groupings called "generations":

- The "first generation" includes towns and cities known as original capitals of founding Yoruba kingdoms or states.
- The "second generation" consists of settlements created by conquest.
- The "third generation" consists of villages and municipalities that emerged after the internecine wars of the 19th century.

== Geography ==
In Africa, the Yoruba are bordered to the southeast by the Itsekiri, a distinct Yoruboid-speaking people of the western Niger Delta; by the Bariba to the northwest in Benin and Nigeria; by the Nupe to the north; and by the Ebira to the northeast in Central Nigeria. To the east are the Edo, Ẹsan, and Afemai groups in Mid-Western Nigeria. To the northeast and adjacent to the Ebira and Northern Edo, groups are the related Igala people on the left bank of the Niger River. To the south are the Gbe-speaking Mahi, Gun, Fon, and Ewe who border Yoruba communities in Benin and Togo, to the west they are bordered by the Kwa-speaking Akebu, Kposo of Togo, and to the northwest, by the Kwa-speaking Anii, and the Gur speaking Kabiye, Yom-Lokpa and Tem people of Togo. Significantly Yoruba populations in other West African countries can also be found in Ghana, Benin, Ivory Coast, and Sierra Leone.

Outside Africa, the Yoruba diaspora consists of two main groupings; the first being that of the Yorubas taken as slaves to the New World between the 16th and 19th centuries, notably to the Caribbean (especially in Cuba) and Brazil, and the second consisting of a wave of relatively recent migrants, the majority of whom began to migrate to the United Kingdom and the United States following some of the major economic and political changes encountered in Africa in the 1960s till date.

== Language ==
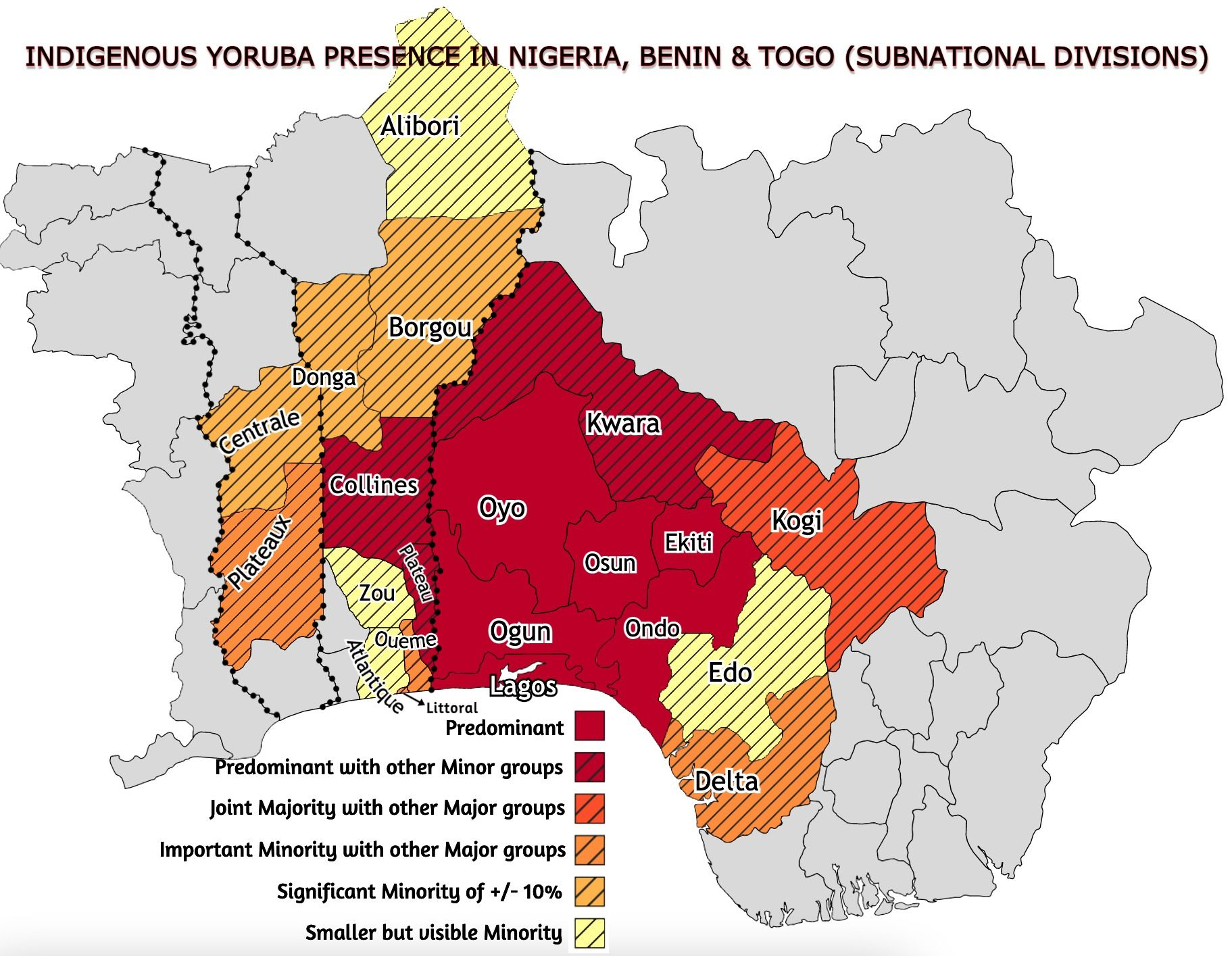
Degree of Presence of The Yoruba and derived Ede groups in Nigeria, Benin & Togo at Subnational levels

The Yoruba culture was originally an oral tradition, and the majority of Yoruba people are native speakers of the Yoruba language. The number of speakers was estimated to be about 30 million as of 2010. Yoruba is classified within the Edekiri languages, a branch of the Yoruboid languages within the Volta-Niger language family.

There are three major dialect areas: Northwest, Central, and Southeast. As the North-West Yoruba dialects show more linguistic innovation, combined with the fact that Southeast and Central Yoruba areas generally have older settlements, suggests a later date of immigration into Northwestern Yoruba territory. The area where North-West Yoruba (NWY) is spoken corresponds to the historical Oyo Empire. South-East Yoruba (SEY) was closely associated with the expansion of the Benin Empire after c. 1450. Central Yoruba forms a transitional area in that the lexicon has much in common with NWY, whereas it shares many ethnographical features with SEY.

Literary Yoruba is the standard variety taught in schools and spoken by newsreaders on the radio. It is mostly entirely based on northwestern Yoruba dialects of the Oyos and the Egbas, and has its origins in two sources; The work of Yoruba Christian missionaries based mostly in the Egba hinterland at Abeokuta, and the Yoruba grammar compiled in the 1850s by Bishop Crowther, who himself was a Sierra Leonean Recaptive of Oyo origin. This was exemplified by the following remark by Adetugbọ (1967), as cited in Fagborun (1994): "While the orthography agreed upon by the missionaries represented to a very large degree the phonemes of the Abẹokuta dialect, the morpho-syntax reflected the Ọyọ-Ibadan dialects."

== Group identity ==
Yoruba people have a sense of group identity based on shared cultural concepts, beliefs and practices. Prominent among these is the tracing of the Yoruba body through dynastic migrations to roots in Ile-Ife, an ancient city in the forested heart of central Yorubaland and its acceptance as the spiritual nucleus of Yoruba existence. Following this linkage to the ancient city of Ife is the acknowledgement of an historic crowned king, Oduduwa, who is considered the 'father' of the Yoruba people. According to Ife's own account, Ife was predated by a confederacy of 13 semi-autonomous communities led by Obatala and based around a swampy depression surrounded by seven hills. Oduduwa was born in the hilltop community of Oke Ora and was an outsider of the politics of the valley. He revolutionized the confederacy, creating Ife west of Oke Ora.

Cultural markers which unite the Yoruba people include their spiritual concepts and chief divinities (Orisha), that have achieved pan-Yoruba statuses. These divinities are venerated as embodiments of natural forces and divine power. They are also the mediators between the common people and Olodumare, God. They include some now well-known divinities such as Obatala, Ogun, Orunmila, Osun, Eshu, Olokun, Yemoja, Osanyin, and Shango, among others. These are now recognizable in the New World as divinities brought across the Atlantic by people of Yoruba descent. There in their new ex-situ environment, they serve as a mechanism of maintaining group identity, as well as a powerful connection to the Yoruba homeland among people of Yoruba descent and others. Examples of such new world practices are Santeria, Candomble, Umbanda, Kélé and Trinidad Orisha, which are not only religious societies, but also actual ethnic communities for those who sought to maintain their unique heritages over time, although anyone could join as long as they became immersed in the Yoruba worldview.

Linguistically, the Yoruba language comprises a broad continuum of closely related regional dialects which strongly bind their speakers into the same linguistic community. This dialectal area spans from the lands of the Ana-Ife in central Togo and eastern Ghana eastwards to the lands of the Ilaje along the coast of southern Ondo State, southwestern Nigeria. This area, inhabited by geographically contiguous and culturally related subgroups, was divided into national and subnational units under the control of different European powers as a result of the Berlin Conference in 19th century Europe and the resultant administration. The Yoruba also notably developed a common identity under the influence of Oyo, a regional empire that developed in the northwestern savanna section of Yorubaland as a result of a kingdom founding migration from the Ife Empire. The Ife Empire between 1200 and the mid-1400s was forest-based and spread its influence through religion, politics, philosophy and commerce. By contrast, Oyo was a highly militaristic grassland state that replaced Ife as the Yoruba power. It established its influence over kingdoms stretching from central Togo in the west to central Yorubaland in the east, and from the Niger river in the north to the Atlantic coast in the south, the whole of Dahomey, southern Borgu, the Mahi states, southern Nupe and the Aja people. From the 16th to the 19th centuries, Oyo had many wars and established a reputation among the neighbouring kingdoms of Ashanti, Dahomey, Borgu, Nupe, Igala and Benin as well as further afield in Songhai, the Hausa Kingdoms and others. It solidified its place in the greater region as a powerhouse strategically placed between the forest and the savanna and as representing a cultural unit which it defended. During the 18th century, during the reign of Ajagbo, the rulers of the Yoruba-speaking kingdoms of Oyo, Egba, Ketu, and Ijebu considered each other "brothers" led by Oyo.

At the beginning of the 19th century, the Yoruba community was made up of the following main units; The British colony of Lagos, traditionally called Eko; Ketu, a western Yoruba state bordering the kingdom of Dahomey; Egba, with its capital at Abeokuta; Ijebu, a southern Yoruba kingdom in the immediate vicinity of an inland lagoon; a confederation of Ekiti sub-tribes in the hilly country to the northeast; Ibadan, a successor republican state to Oyo; Ijesha; the historic kingdom of Ife which continued to maintain its sacred primacy; Ondo, on the east; the littoral Mahin/Ilaje on the southeastern maritime coast, and several other smaller states such as the Egbado, Akoko groups, Yagba, Awori as well as independent townships, consisting of a town and its outlying dependent villages such as Oke-Odan, Ado, and Igbessa.

Other cultural factors which bind the Yoruba people include historic dynastic migrations of royals and the micro migrations of people within the Yoruba cultural space has led to the mixing of people evidenced by the duplication and multiplication of place names and royal titles across Yoruba country. Today, places with names containing; Owu, Ifon, Ife, Ado, etc., can be found scattered across Yorubaland regardless of subgroup. The same can be observed of certain localized royal titles, e.g. Ajalorun, Owa, and Olu. Olofin, the original title of Oduduwa in Ife, is remembered in the lore of most places in Yorubaland. Occupational engagements like farming, hunting, crafting, blacksmithing, trading and fishing for the coastal or riparian groups are commonplace. Joint customs in greeting, birth, marriage and death, a strong sense of community, urbanism, festivities and a respect for the elderly are also all universal Yoruba concepts.

== Pre-colonial government of Yoruba society ==
=== Government ===
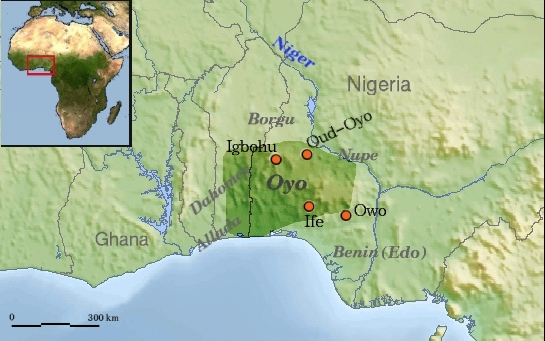
Oyo Empire and surrounding states

Monarchies were a common form of government in Yorubaland, but they were not the only approach to government and social organization. The numerous Ijebu kingdom city-states to the west of Oyo and the Egba people communities, found in the forests below Ọyọ's savanna region, were notable exceptions. These independent polities often elected a king though real political, legislative, and judicial powers resided with the Ogboni, a council of notable elders. The notion of the divine king was so important to the Yoruba, however, that it has been part of their organization in its various forms from their antiquity to the contemporary era.

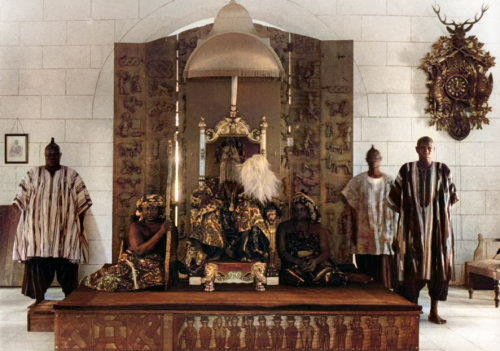
Palace of the King of Oyo circa 1900s – Colorized

During the internecine wars of the 19th century, the Ijebu forced citizens of more than 150 Ẹgba and Owu communities to migrate to the fortified city of Abeokuta. Each quarter retained its own Ogboni council of civilian leaders, along with an Olorogun, or council of military leaders, and in some cases, its own elected Obas or Baales. These independent councils elected their most capable members to join a federal civilian and military council that represented the city as a whole. Commander Frederick Forbes, a representative of the British Crown writing an account of his visit to the city in the Church Military Intelligencer (1853), described Abẹokuta as having "four presidents", and the system of government as having "840 principal rulers or 'House of Lords,' 2800 secondary chiefs or 'House of Commons,' 140 principal military ones and 280 secondary ones." He described Abẹokuta and its system of government as "the most extraordinary republic in the world."

=== Leadership ===
Gerontocratic leadership councils that guarded against the monopolization of power by a monarch were a trait of the Ẹgba, according to the eminent Ọyọ historian Reverend Samuel Johnson. Such councils were also well-developed among the northern Okun groups, the eastern Ekiti, and other groups falling under the Yoruba ethnic umbrella. In Ọyọ, the most centralized of the precolonial kingdoms, the Alaafin consulted on all political decisions with the prime minister and principal kingmaker (the Basọrun) and the rest of the council of leading nobles known as the Ọyọ Mesi.

Traditionally kingship and chieftainship were not determined by simple primogeniture, as in most monarchic systems of government. An electoral college of lineage heads was and still is usually charged with selecting a member of one of the royal families from any given realm, and the selection is then confirmed by an Ifá oracular request. The Ọbas live in palaces that are usually in the center of the town. Opposite the king's palace is the Ọja Ọba, or the king's market. These markets form an inherent part of Yoruba life. Traditionally their traders are well organized, have various guilds, officers, and an elected speaker. They also often have at least one Iyaloja, or Lady of the Market, who is expected to represent their interests in the aristocratic council of oloyes at the palace.

=== City-states ===
The monarchy of any city-state was usually limited to a number of royal lineages. A family could be excluded from kingship and chieftaincy if any family member, servant, or slave belonging to the family committed a crime, such as theft, fraud, murder or rape. In other city-states, the monarchy was open to the election of any free-born male citizen. In Ilesa, Ondo, Akure and other Yoruba communities, there were several, but comparatively rare, traditions of female Ọbas. The kings were traditionally almost always polygamous and often married royal family members from other domains, thereby creating useful alliances with other rulers. Ibadan, a city-state and proto-empire that was founded in the 1800s by a polyglot group of refugees, soldiers, and itinerant traders after the fall of Ọyọ, largely dispensed with the concept of monarchism, preferring to elect both military and civil councils from a pool of eminent citizens. The city became a military republic, with distinguished soldiers wielding political power through their election by popular acclaim and the respect of their peers. Similar practices were adopted by the Ijẹsa and other groups, which saw a corresponding rise in the social influence of military adventurers and successful entrepreneurs. The Ìgbómìnà were renowned for their agricultural and hunting prowess, as well as their woodcarving, leather art, and the famous Elewe masquerade.

=== Groups, organizations and leagues in Yorubaland ===
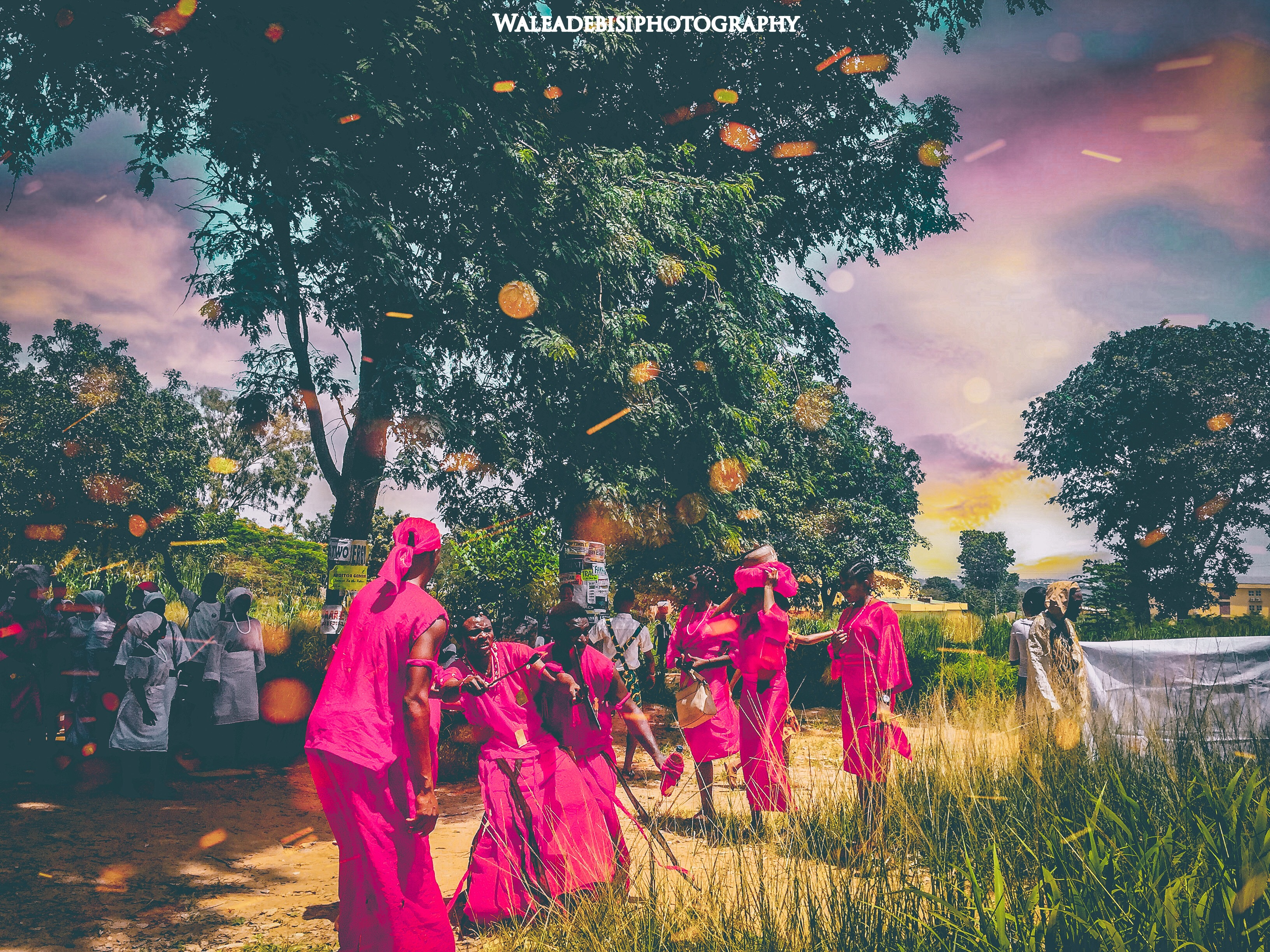
Depiction of a traditional Sango venerating fraternity

Occupational guilds, social clubs, secret or initiatory societies, and religious units, commonly known as Ẹgbẹ in Yoruba, included the Parakoyi (or league of traders) and Ẹgbẹ Ọdẹ (hunter's guild), and maintained an important role in commerce, social control, and vocational education in Yoruba polities. There are also examples of other peer organizations in the region. When the Ẹgba resisted the imperial domination of the Ọyọ Empire, a figure named Lisabi is credited with either creating or reviving a covert traditional organization named Ẹgbẹ Aro. This group, originally a farmers' union, was converted to a network of secret militias throughout the Ẹgba forests, and each lodge plotted and successfully managed to overthrow Ọyọ's Ajeles (appointed administrators) in the late 18th century. Similarly, covert military resistance leagues like the Ekiti Parapọ and the Ogidi alliance were organized during the 19th century wars by often-decentralized communities of the Ekiti, Ijẹsa, Ìgbómìnà and Okun Yoruba to resist various imperial expansionist plans of Ibadan, Nupe, and the Sokoto Caliphate.

== Society and culture ==
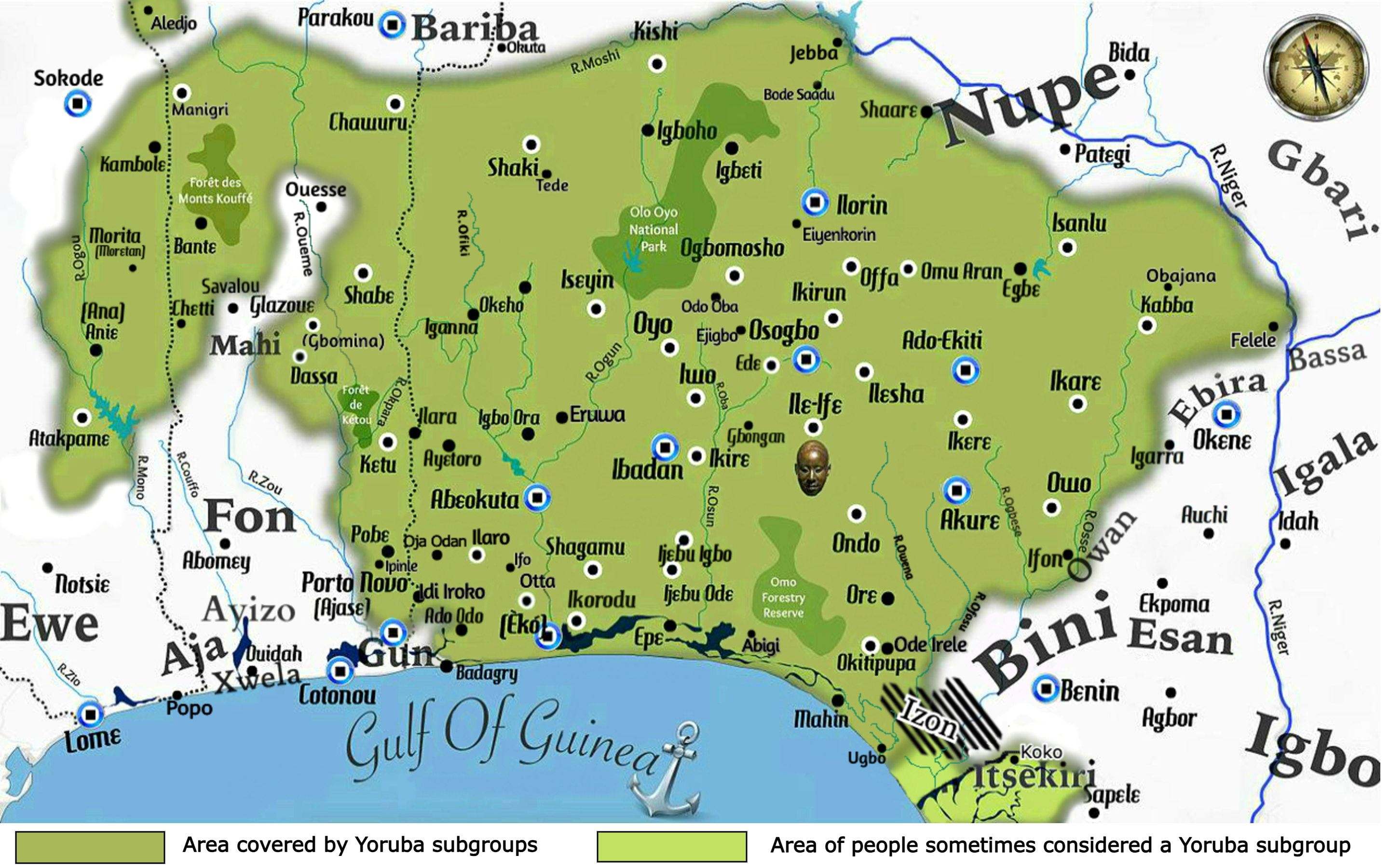
Yorubaland Cultural Area of West Africa

Cities indigenous to the Yoruba people include but are not limited to Ibadan, Lagos, Abeokuta, Ilorin, Ogbomoso, Oyo, Osogbo, Ile Ife, Okitipupa, Ijebu Ode, Akure, Offa, among others. In the city-states and many of their neighbours, a reserved way of life remains, with the school of thought of their people serving as a major influence in West Africa and elsewhere.

Today, most contemporary Yoruba are Muslims or Christians. Be that as it may, many of the principles of the traditional faith of their ancestors are either knowingly or unknowingly upheld by a significant proportion of the populations of Nigeria, Benin and Togo.

=== Traditional Yoruba religion ===
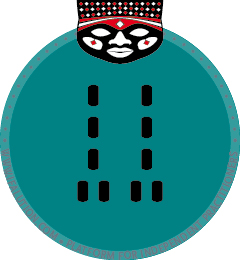
Ogunda Meji, one of the sixteen principals of 256 Odus (the corpus of Ifa literature) represented on a virtual Opon Ifa board

The Yoruba religion comprises the traditional religious and spiritual concepts and practices of the Yoruba people. Its homeland is in Southwestern Nigeria and the adjoining parts of Benin and Togo, a region that has come to be known as Yorubaland. Yoruba religion is formed of diverse traditions and has no single founder. Yoruba religious beliefs are part of itan, the total complex of songs, histories, stories, mythologies, and other cultural concepts that make up the Yoruba society.

Next to the Veneration of ancestors, one of the most common Yoruba traditional religious concepts has been the concept of Orisa. Orisa (also spelled Orisha) are various gods and spirits, which serve the ultimate creator force in the Yoruba religious system (Ase). Some widely known Orisa are Ogun, (a god of metal, war and victory), Shango or Jakuta (a god of thunder, lightning, fire and justice who manifests as a king and who always wields a double-edged axe that conveys his divine authority and power), Esu Elegbara (a trickster who serves as the sole messenger of the pantheon, and who conveys the wish of men to the gods. He understands every language spoken by humankind, and is also the guardian of the crossroads, Oríta méta in Yoruba) and Orunmila (a god of the Oracle). Eshu has two forms, which are manifestations of his dual nature – positive and negative energies; Eshu Laroye, a teacher instructor and leader, and Eshu Ebita, a jester, deceitful, suggestive and cunning. Orunmila, for his part, reveals the past, gives solutions to problems in the present, and influences the future through the Ifa divination system, which is practised by oracle priests called Babalawos.

Olorun is one of the principal manifestations of the Supreme God of the Yoruba pantheon, the owner of the heavens, and is associated with the Sun known as Oòrùn in the Yoruba language. The two other principal forms of the supreme God are Olodumare—the supreme creator—and Olofin, who is the conduit between Òrunn (Heaven) and Ayé (Earth). Oshumare is a god that manifests in the form of a rainbow, also known as Òsùmàrè in Yoruba, while Obatala is the god of clarity and creativity.These gods feature in the Yoruba religion, as well as in some aspects of Umbanda, Winti, Obeah, Vodun and a host of others. These varieties, or spiritual lineages as they are called, are practiced throughout areas of Nigeria, among others. As interest in African indigenous religions grows, Orisa communities and lineages can be found in parts of Europe and Asia as well. While estimates may vary, some scholars believe that there could be more than 100 million adherents of this spiritual tradition worldwide.

=== List of Orisha and Ajogun ===
Name	Deity of	Member of
Agẹmọ	Chameleon, Service	Orisha
Aganju	Volcanoes, Wilderness, Desert, Fire	Orisha
Ajaka	Peace, Love, Equality	Orisha
Akọgun	Warrior, Hunter, Wearers of straw	Orisha
Ayangalu	Drummer, Muse, Percussion	Orisha
Arira (Aara, Aira, Ara)	Weather, Storm, Thunder	Orisha
Ayelala	Crime and punishment, Retribution	Orisha
Arọni	Nature, Forest spirits, Herbs, Plants	Orisha
Arun	Diseases, Affliction	Ajogun
Aje	Wealth, Property, Good Fortune, Success	Orisha
Aye	Passion, Environmentalism, Nature	Orisha
Ajija (Aaja, Aija, Aja)	Whirlwind, Wilderness, Herbs, Plants, Leaf	Orisha
Biri	Darkness, Night, Midnight	Orisha
Babalu Aye	Earth, Epidemics (Smallpox), Healing	Orisha
Bayanni	Children, Dread Heads, Prosperity	Orisha
Dada	Youthfulness, Mischief, Playfulness	Orisha
Ẹla	Illumination, Knowledge, Charity and Giving	Orisha
Edi	Confusion, Undoing, Corruption	Ajogun
Ẹgba	Paralysis, Ineptitude, Laziness	Ajogun
Egungun (Eegun)	Sainted dead, Ancestors	Orisha
Epe	Curses, Imprecation	Ajogun
Erinlẹ	Hunter, Earth, Natural Force, Universe	Orisha
Eṣe	Affliction, Scourge	Ajogun
Eshu	Trickery, Crossroads, Chance, Travel, Emissary, Chaos, Order	Intermediary
Ẹwọn	Imprisonment, Bondage	Ajogun
Ibeji	Twins	Orisha
Iroko	Trees, Wilderness	Orisha
Iya Nla	Primordial Spirit	Orisha
Iku	Death	Ajogun
Imọlẹ	Sunlight, Soothsayer	Orisha
Logunede	War, Hunting	Orisha
Moremi	Saviour	Orisha
Ọba	River, Passion, Homemaking, Domesticity	Orisha
Ọbatala	Creation, Purity	Orisha
Oduduwa	Progenitor, Warrior	Orisha
Ofo	Loss, Depletion, Deprivation, Forfeiture, Defeat	Ajogun
Ogun	Warriors, Soldiers, Blacksmiths, Metal Workers, Craftsmen	Orisha
Oke	Mountain, Hills and Hillocks	Orisha
Orisha Oko	Agriculture, Farming, Fertility, Rurality, Harvest	Orisha
Olokun	Water, Health, Wealth	Orisha
Ọran	Trouble, Problems, Difficulty	Ajogun
Ọranyan	Progenitor, Bravery, Heroism	Orisha
Orò	Justice, Bullroarers	Orisha
Ọrọnṣẹn	Progenitor	Orisha
Ọrunmila	Wisdom, Knowledge, Divination, philosophy, Destiny, Prophecy	Orisha
Ori	Prelife, Afterlife, Destiny, Personal Identity	Orisha
Ọsanyin	Herbs, Plants, Nature, Herbalists, Magicians	Orisha
Ọshọsi	Hunt, Forest, Warrior, Justice	Orisha
Ọshun	Water, Purity, Fertility, Love, Femininity	Orisha
Oshunmare	Rainbow, Serpent, Regeneration, Rebirth	Orisha
Ọtin	River, Fighter	Orisha
Ọya	Storms, Wind, Thunder, Lightning, Dead	Orisha
Shango	Thunder, Lightning, Fire, Justice, Dance, Virility	Orisha
Shigidi	Home guardian, Environment guardian, Defender	Orisha
Yemoja	Creation, Water, Moon, Motherhood, Protection	Orisha
Yewa	River, Dreams, Clarity	Orisha

==== Mythology ====
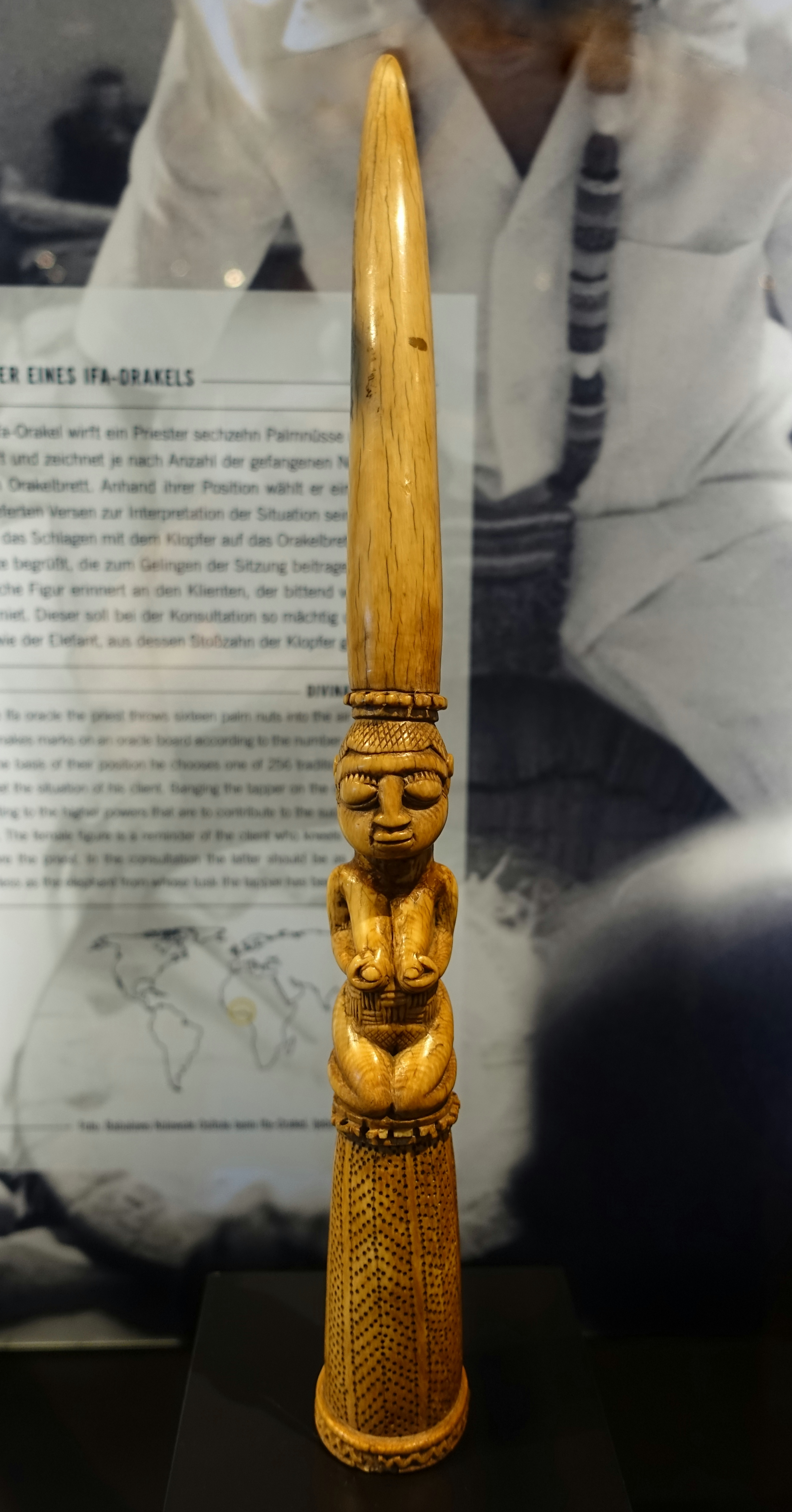
An Iroke or Irofa (Ìròkè Ifá) is the divination tapper of the Yoruba. It is long, slender and often slightly curved. Used in combination with the Opon Ifa or divination board. Traditionally made from ivory, but also brass and wood.

Oral history of the Oyo-Yoruba recounts Odùduwà to be the progenitor of the Yoruba and the reigning ancestor of their crowned kings.

He came from the east, understood in Ife traditions to be the settlement of Oke Ora, a hilltop community situated to the east of Ife.

After the death of Oduduwa, there was a dispersal of his children in a series of kingdom founding migrations from Ife to found other kingdoms. Each child made his or her mark in the subsequent urbanization and consolidation of the Yoruba confederacy of kingdoms, with each kingdom tracing its origin due to them to Ile-Ife.

After the dispersal, the aborigines became difficult, and constituted a serious threat to the survival of Ife. Thought to be survivors of the old occupants of the land before the arrival of Oduduwa, these people now turned themselves into marauders. They would come to town in costumes made of raffia with terrible and fearsome appearances, and burn down houses and loot the markets. Then came Moremi Ajasoro into the scene; she was said to have played a significant role in the quelling of the marauder advancements. But this was at a great price; having to give up her only son Oluorogbo. The reward for her patriotism and selflessness was not to be reaped in one lifetime as she later passed on and was thereafter deified. The Edi festival celebrates this feat among her Yoruba descendants.

==== Philosophy ====
Yoruba culture consists of cultural philosophy, religion and folktales. They are embodied in Ifá divination, and are known as the tripartite Book of Enlightenment in Yorubaland and in its diaspora.

Yoruba cultural thought is a witness of two epochs. The first epoch is a history of cosmogony and cosmology. This is also an epoch-making history in the oral culture during which time Oduduwa was the king, the Bringer of Light, pioneer of Yoruba folk philosophy, and a prominent diviner. He pondered the visible and invisible worlds, reminiscing about cosmogony, cosmology, and the mythological creatures in the visible and invisible worlds. His time favored the artist-philosophers who produced magnificent naturalistic artworks of civilization during the pre-dynastic period in Yorubaland. The second epoch is the epoch of metaphysical discourse, and the birth of modern artist-philosophy. This commenced in the 19th century in terms of the academic prowess of Bishop Samuel Ajayi Crowther (1807–1891). Although religion is often first in Yoruba culture, nonetheless, it is the philosophy – the thought of man – that actually leads spiritual consciousness (ori) to the creation and the practice of religion. Thus, it is believed that thought (philosophy) is an antecedent to religion. Values such as respect, peaceful co-existence, loyalty and freedom of speech are both upheld and highly valued in Yoruba culture. Societies that are considered secret societies often strictly guard and encourage the observance of moral values. Today, the academic and nonacademic communities are becoming more interested in Yoruba culture. More research is being carried out on Yoruba cultural thought as more books are being written on the subject.

=== Christianity and Islam ===
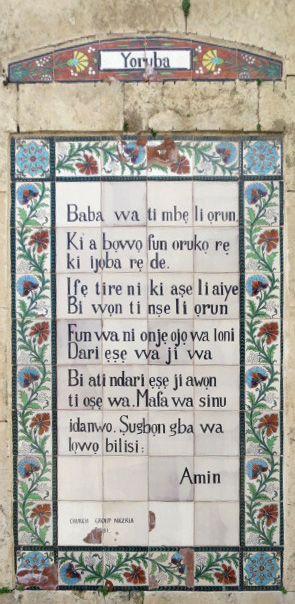
The Lord's prayer in the Yoruba language, Church of the Pater Noster Mount of Olives, Jerusalem

The Yoruba are traditionally very religious people, and are today pluralistic in their religious convictions. The Yoruba are one of the more religiously diverse ethnic groups in Africa. Many Yoruba people practice Christianity in denominations such as Anglicanism while others are Muslims practicing mostly under Sunni Islam of the Maliki school of law. In addition to Christianity and Islam, a large number of Yoruba people continue to practice their traditional religion. Yoruba religious practices such as the Eyo and Osun-Osogbo festivals are witnessing a resurgence in popularity in contemporary Yorubaland. They are largely seen by the adherents of the modern faiths as cultural, rather than religious, events. They participate in them as a means to celebrate their people's history, and boost tourism in their local economies.

==== Christianity ====
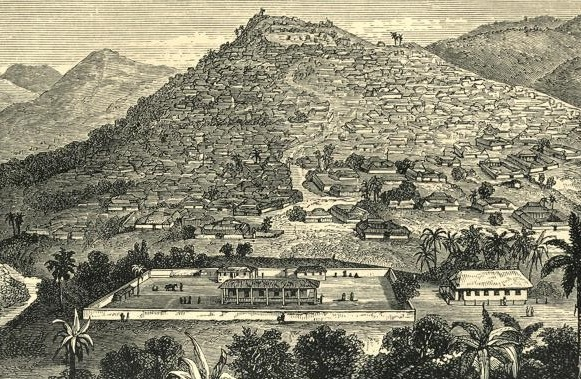
Anna Hinderer church and mission house at Ibadan, 1850s

The Yorubas were one of the first groups in West Africa to be introduced to Christianity on a very large scale. Christianity (along with western civilization) came into Yorubaland in the mid-19th century through the Europeans, whose original mission was commerce. The first European visitors were the Portuguese, they visited the neighboring Bini kingdom in the late 16th century. As time progressed, other Europeans – such as the French, the British, the Dutch, and the Germans, followed suit. The British and the French were the most successful in their quest for colonies (these Europeans actually split Yorubaland, with the larger part being in British Nigeria, and the minor parts in French Dahomey, now Benin, and German Togoland). Home governments encouraged religious organizations to come. Roman Catholics (known to the Yorubas as Ijo Aguda, so named after returning former Yoruba slaves from Latin America, who were mostly Catholic, and were also known as the Agudas or Amaros) started the race, followed by Protestants, whose prominent member – Church Mission Society (CMS) based in England made the most significant in-roads into the hinterland regions for evangelism and became the largest of the Christian missions. Methodists (known as Ijo-Eleto, so named after the Yoruba word for "method or process") started missions in Agbadarigi / Gbegle by Thomas Birch Freeman in 1842. Agbadarigi was further served by E. C. Van Cooten, E. G. Irving, and A. A. Harrison. Henry Townsend, C. C. Gollmer, and Ajayi Crowther of the CMS worked in Abeokuta, then under the Egba division of Southern Nigeria in 1846.

Hinderer and Mann of CMS started missions in Ibadan / Ibarapa and Ijaye divisions of the present Oyo state in 1853. Baptist missionaries – Bowen and Clarke – concentrated on the northern Yoruba axis – (Ogbomoso and environs). With their success, other religious groups – the Salvation Army and the Evangelists Commission of West Africa – became popular among the Igbomina, and other non-denominational Christian groups joined. The increased tempo of Christianity led to the appointment of Saros (returning slaves from Sierra Leone) and indigenes as missionaries. This move was initiated by Venn, the CMS Secretary. Nevertheless, the impact of Christianity in Yorubaland was not felt until the fourth decade of the 19th century, when a Yoruba slave boy, Samuel Ajayi Crowther, became a Christian convert, linguist and minister whose knowledge in languages would become a major tool and instrument to propagate Christianity in Yorubaland and beyond.

==== Islam ====
The Yorubas knew of Islam from around the 14th century, as a result of trade with Wangara (also called Wankore) merchants, a mobile caste of the Soninkes from the then Mali Empire who entered Yorubaland (Oyo) from the northwestern flank through the Bariba or Borgu corridor, during the reign of Mansa Musa. Due to this, Islam is traditionally known to the Yoruba as Esin Male or simply Imale i.e. religion of the Malians.

At Oyo-Ile, a mosque had been erected dating back as far as 1550 CE The mosque served the spiritual needs of, largely foreign, Muslim traders living in Ọyọ with widespread conversions among native Yorubas remaining limited for centuries.

Although Islam had initially entered Yorubaland via the aforementioned Malian traders, the main wave of Islamic influence and conversions among the Yoruba stemmed from the 19th century Fula jihad. Yoruba military forces effectively halted the southward expansion of the Fula jihad, which had previously conquered Hausaland and founded the Sokoto Caliphate. Following the jihad led by Dan Fodio, the Fulas took control of Ilorin (a former Oyo outpost) and attempted to extend their influence deeper into Yorubaland. Yoruba warriors, particularly the rising strength of Ibadan headed by commanders such as Balogun Oderinlo, decisively repelled the jihadis at the Battle of Osogbo around 1840, bringing an end to their jihad and maintaining the independence of core southern Yoruba territories.

A relatively small number of Yoruba people that were enslaved and trafficked to the Americas during the 19th century were Muslim. Most of these enslaved Muslims were likely recent converts and practiced a syncretized form of Islam, still adhering to traditional Orisha practices.

=== Traditional art and architecture ===
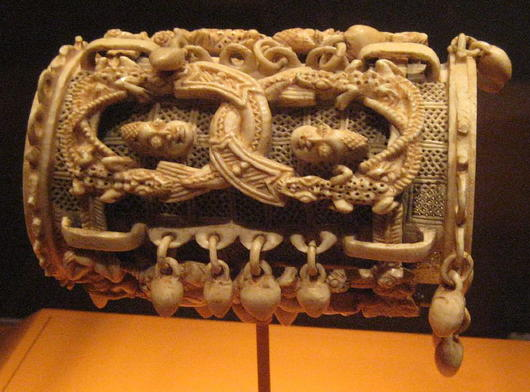
Intricately carved ivory bracelet from the Yoruba people of Owo

Medieval Yoruba settlements were surrounded with massive mud walls. Yoruba buildings had similar plans to the Ashanti shrines, but with verandahs around the court. The wall materials comprised puddled mud and palm oil while roofing materials ranged from thatches to corrugated iron sheets. A famous Yoruba fortification, the Sungbo's Eredo, was the second largest wall edifice in Africa. The structure was built in the 9th, 10th and 11th centuries in honour of a traditional aristocrat, the Oloye Bilikisu Sungbo. It was made up of sprawling mud walls and the valleys that surrounded the town of Ijebu-Ode in Ogun State. Sungbo's Eredo is the largest pre-colonial monument in Africa, larger than the Great Pyramid or Great Zimbabwe.

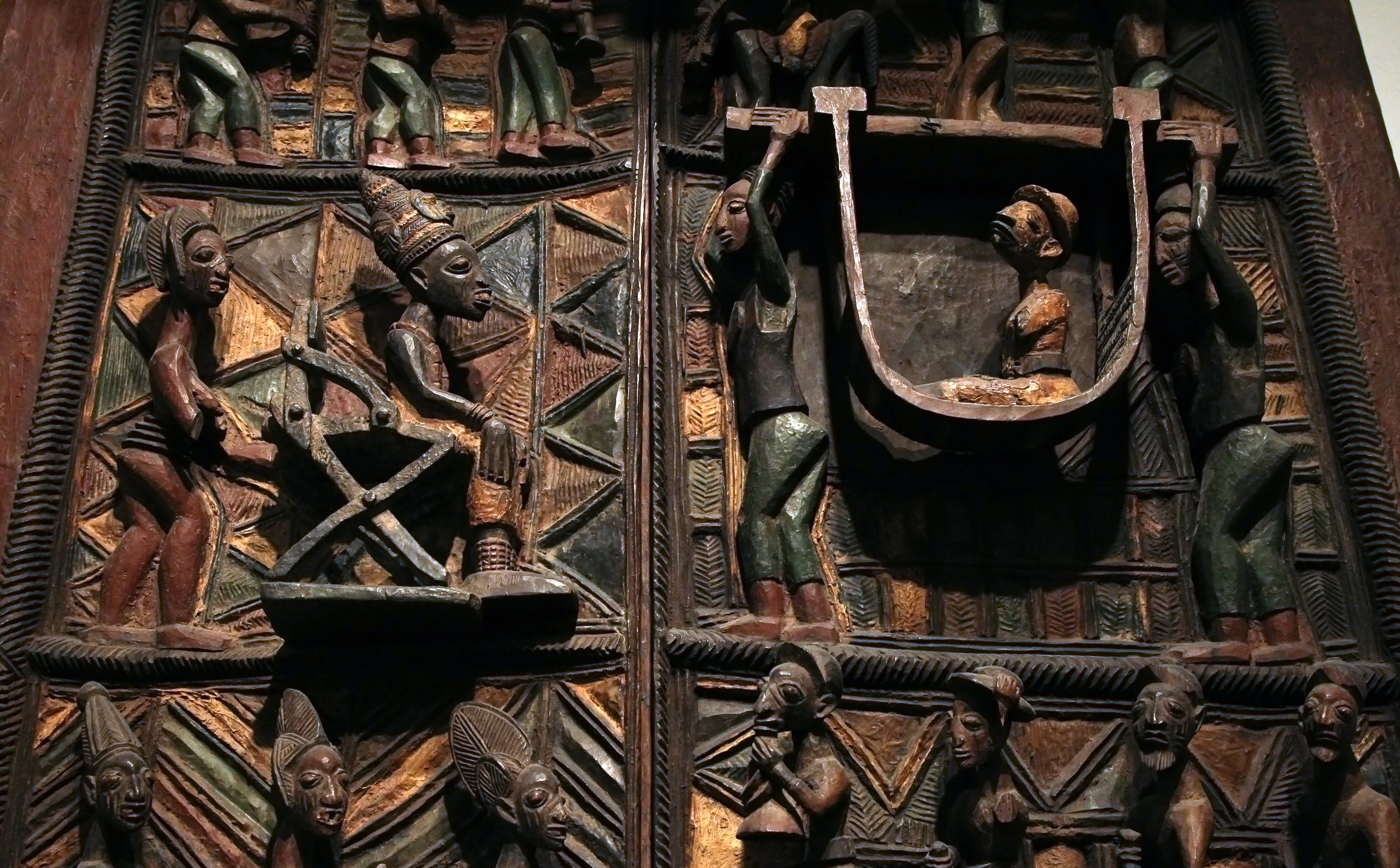
Yoruba door, wood carvings; used to record events c. 1910

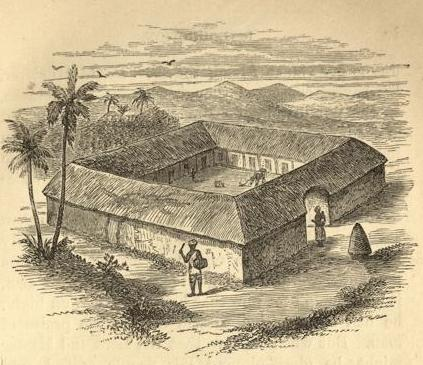
Early 19th century Yoruba architecture showing their unique inner courtyard layout used as a safe space for storing livestock and a space where children could play

The Yorubas worked with a wide array of materials in their art including; bronze, leather, terracotta, ivory, textiles, copper, stone, carved wood, brass, ceramics and glass. A unique feature of Yoruba art is its striking realism that, unlike most African art, chose to create human sculptures in vividly realistic and life sized forms. The art history of the nearby Benin empire shows that there was a cross–fertilization of ideas between the neighboring Yoruba and Edo. The Benin court's brass casters learned their art from an Ife master named Iguegha, who had been sent from Ife around 1400 at the request of Benin's oba Oguola. Indeed, the earliest dated cast-brass memorial heads from Benin replicate the refined naturalism of the earlier Yoruba sculptures from Ife.

A lot of Yoruba artwork, including staffs, court dress, and beadwork for crowns, are associated with palaces and the royal courts. The courts also commissioned numerous architectural objects such as veranda posts, gates, and doors that are embellished with carvings. Yoruba palaces are usually built with thicker walls, are dedicated to the gods and play significant spiritual roles. Yoruba art is also manifested in shrines and masking traditions. The shrines dedicated to the said gods are adorned with carvings and house an array of altar figures and other ritual paraphernalia. Masking traditions vary by region, and diverse mask types are used in various festivals and celebrations. Aspects of Yoruba traditional architecture have also found their way into the New World in the form of shotgun houses. Today, however, Yoruba traditional architecture has been greatly influenced by modern trends.

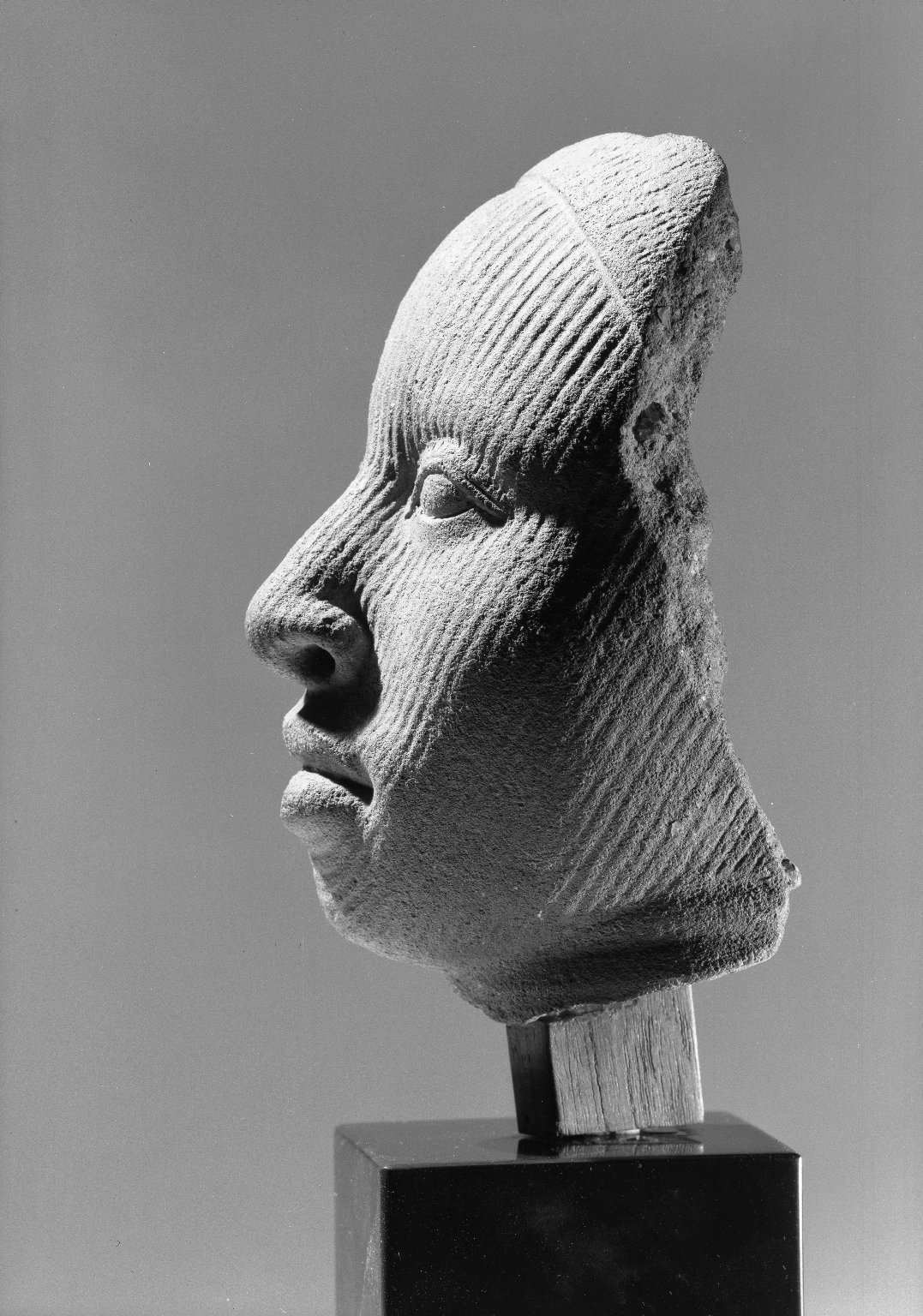
Terracotta head representing oni or King of Ife, 12th to 16th century

Masquerades are an important feature of Yoruba traditional artistry. They are generally known as Egúngún, singularly as Egún. The term refers to the Yoruba masquerades connected with ancestor reverence, or to the ancestors themselves as a collective force. There are different types of which one of the most prominent is the Gelede. An Ese Ifa (oral literature of Orunmila divination) explains the origins of Gelede as beginning with Yemoja, the Mother of all the Orisa and all living things. Yemoja could not have children and consulted an Ifa oracle, and the priest advised her to offer sacrifices and to dance with wooden images on her head and metal anklets on her feet. After performing this ritual, she became pregnant. Her first child was a boy, nicknamed "Efe" (the humorist/joker); the Efe mask emphasizes song and jests because of the personality of its namesake. Yemoja's second child was a girl, nicknamed "Gelede" because she was obese like her mother. Also like her mother, Gelede loved dancing.

After getting married themselves, neither Gelede or Efe's partner could have children. The Ifá oracle suggested they try the same ritual that had worked for their mother. No sooner than Efe and Gelede performed these rituals – dancing with wooden images on their heads and metal anklets on their feet – they started having children. These rituals developed into the Gelede masked dance and were perpetuated by the descendants of Efe and Gelede. This narrative is one of many stories that explains the origin of Gelede. An old theory stated that the beginning of Gelede might be associated with the change from a matriarchal to a patriarchal society among the Yoruba people.

The Gelede spectacle and the Ifá divination system represent two of Nigeria's only three pieces on the United Nations' Oral and Intangible Heritages of Humanity list, as well as the only such cultural heritage from Benin and Togo.

=== Festivals ===
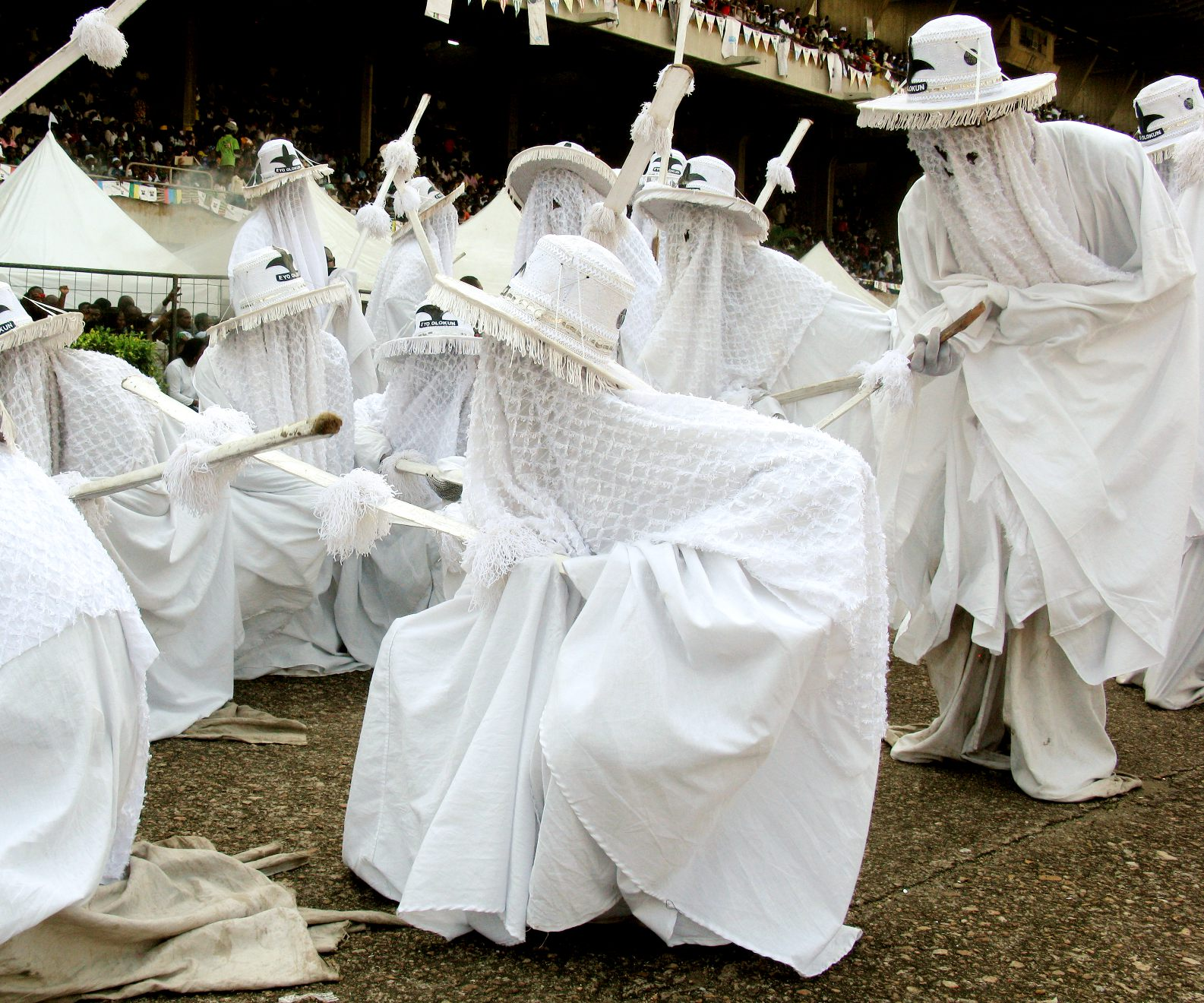
Eyo Olokun

One of the first observations of first time visitors to Yorubaland is the rich, exuberant and ceremonial nature of their culture, which is made even more visible by the urbanized structures of Yoruba settlements. These occasions are avenues to experience the richness of the Yoruba culture. Traditional musicians are always on hand to grace the occasions with heavy rhythms and extremely advanced percussion, which the Yorubas are well known for all over the world. Praise singers and griots are there to add their historical insight to the meaning and significance of the ceremony, and of course the varieties of colorful dresses and attires worn by the people, attest to the aesthetic sense of the average Yoruba.

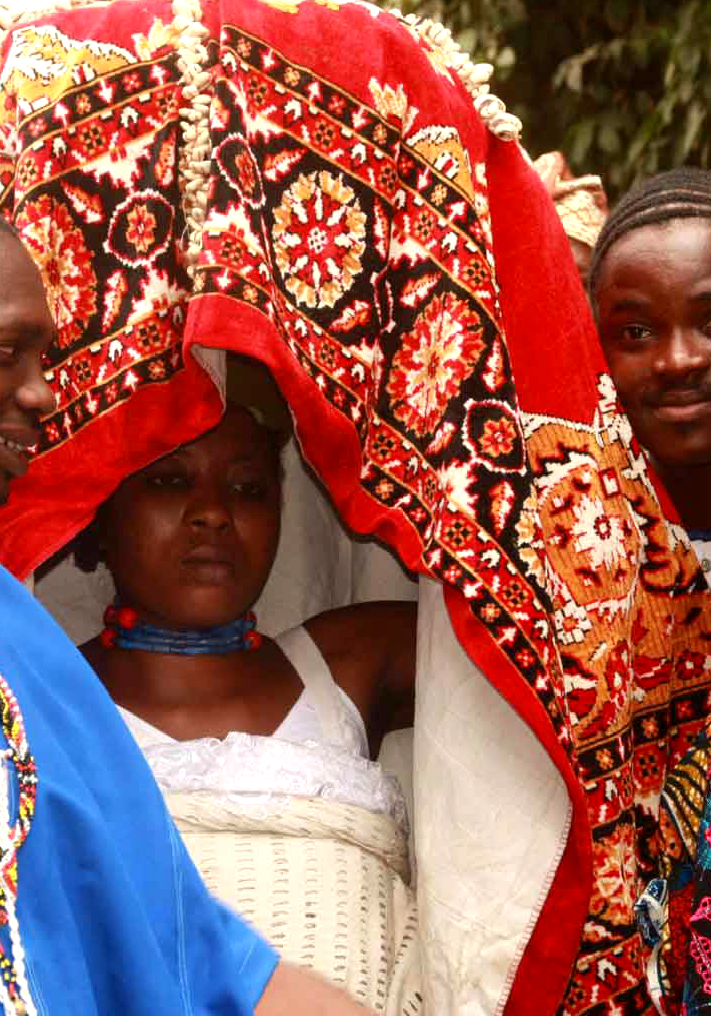
The Arugba leading the procession to the Osun grove

The Yoruba are a very expressive people who celebrate major events with colorful festivals and celebrations (Ayeye). Some of these festivals (about thirteen principal ones) are secular and only mark achievements and milestones in the achievement of mankind. These include wedding ceremonies (Ìgbéyàwó), naming ceremonies (Ìsomolórúko), funerals (Ìsìnkú), housewarming (Ìsílé), New-Yam festival (Ìjesu), Harvest ceremonies (Ìkórè), birth (Ìbí), chieftaincy (Ìjòyè) and so on. Others have a more spiritual connotation, such as the various days and celebrations dedicated to specific Orisha like the Ogun day (Ojó Ògún) or the Osun festival, which is usually done at the Osun-Osogbo sacred grove located on the banks of the Osun river and around the ancient town of Osogbo. The festival is dedicated to the river goddess Osun, which is usually celebrated in the month of August (Osù Ògùn) yearly. The festival attracts thousands of Osun worshippers from all over Yorubaland and the Yoruba diaspora in the Americas, spectators and tourists from all walks of life. The Osun-Osogbo Festival is a two-week-long programme. It starts with the traditional cleansing of the town called 'Iwopopo', which is then followed in three days by the lighting of the 500-year-old sixteen-point lamp called Ina Olojumerindinlogun, which literally means The sixteen eyed fire. The lighting of this sacred lamp heralds the beginning of the Osun festival. Then comes the 'Ibroriade', an assemblage of the crowns of the past ruler, the Ataoja of Osogbo, for blessings. This event is led by the sitting Ataoja of Osogbo and the Arugba Yeye Osun (who is usually a young virgin from the royal family dressed in white), who carries a sacred white calabash that contains propitiation materials meant for the goddess Osun. She is also accompanied by a committee of priestesses. A similar event holds in the New World as Odunde Festival.

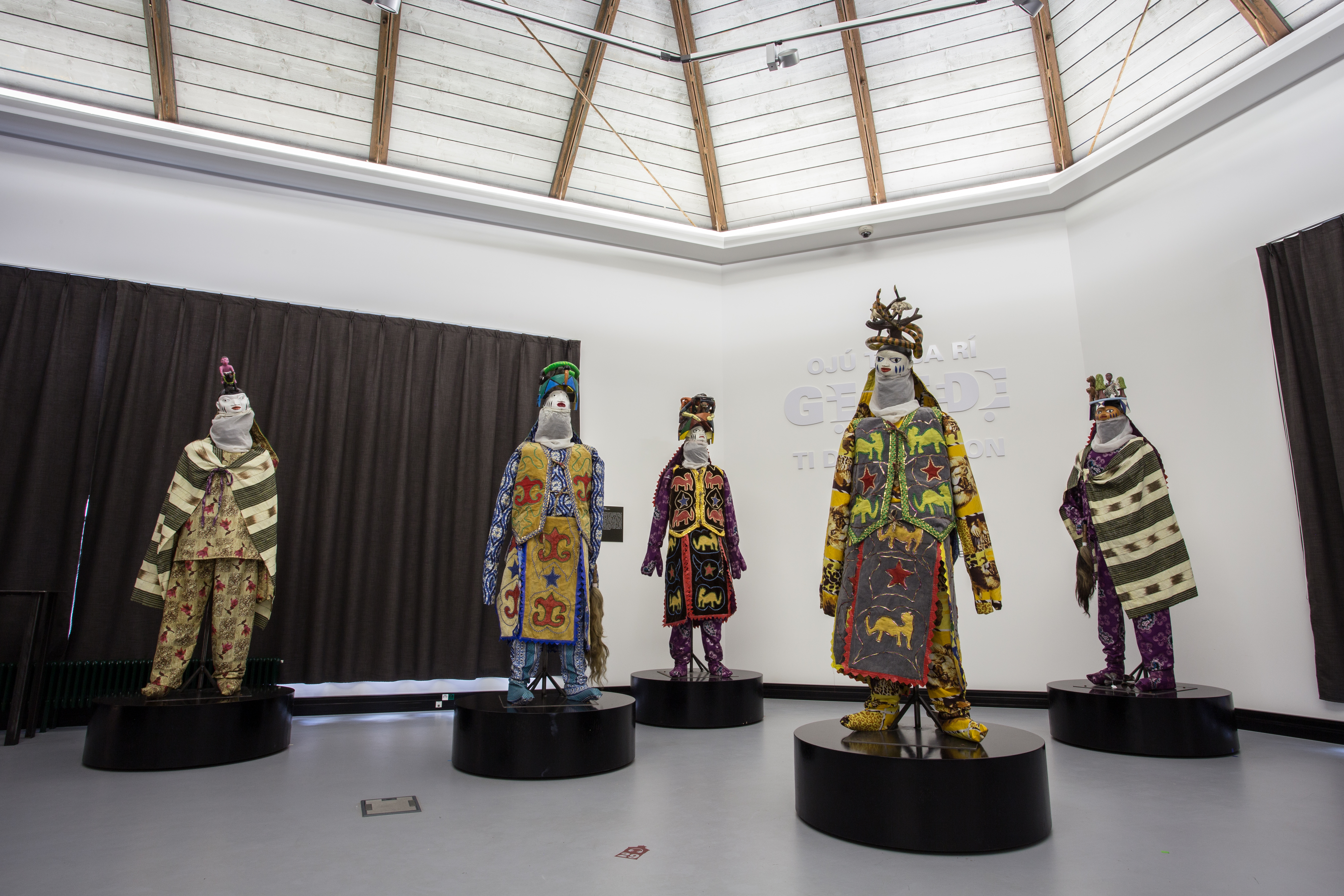
Gèlèdé costumes from a Yoruba-Nago community in Benin

Another very popular festival with spiritual connotations is the Eyo Olokun festival or Adamu Orisha play, celebrated by the people of Lagos. The Eyo festival is a dedication to the god of the Sea Olokun, who is an Orisha, and whose name literally mean Owner of the Seas. Generally, there is no customarily defined time for the staging of the Eyo Festival. This leads to a building anticipation as to what date would be decided upon. Once a date for its performance is selected and announced, the festival preparations begin. It encompasses a week-long series of activities, and culminates in a striking procession of thousands of men clothed in white and wearing a variety of coloured hats, called Aga. The procession moves through Lagos Island Isale Eko, which is the historical centre of the Lagos metropolis. On the streets, they move through various crucial locations and landmarks in the city, including the palace of the traditional ruler of Lagos, the Oba, known as the Iga Idunganran. The festival starts from dusk to dawn, and has been held on Saturdays (Ojó Àbáméta) from time immemorial. A full week before the festival (always a Sunday), the 'senior' Eyo group, the Adimu (identified by a black, broad-rimmed hat), goes public with a staff. When this happens, it means the event will take place on the following Saturday. Each of the four other 'important' groups – Laba (red), Oniko (yellow), Ologede (green) and Agere (purple) — take their turns in that order from Monday to Thursday.

The Eyo masquerade essentially admits tall people, which is why it is described as Agogoro Eyo (literally meaning the tall Eyo masquerade). In the manner of a spirit (An Orisha) visiting the earth on a purpose, the Eyo masquerade speaks in a ventriloquial voice, suggestive of its otherworldliness; and when greeted, it replies: Mo yo fun e, mo yo fun ara mi, which in Yoruba means: I rejoice for you, and I rejoice for myself. This response connotes the masquerades as rejoicing with the person greeting it for the witnessing of the day, and its own joy at taking the hallowed responsibility of cleansing. During the festival, Sandals and foot wear, as well as Suku, a hairstyle that is popular among the Yorubas – one that has the hair converge at the middle, then shoot upward, before tipping downward – are prohibited. The festival has also taken a more touristic dimension in recent times, which like the Osun Osogbo festival, attracts visitors from all across Nigeria, as well as Yoruba diaspora populations. In fact, it is widely believed that the play is one of the manifestations of the customary African revelry that serves as the forerunner of the modern carnival in Brazil and other parts of the New World, which may have been started by the Yoruba slaves transplanted in that part of the world due to the Atlantic slave trade.

=== Music ===
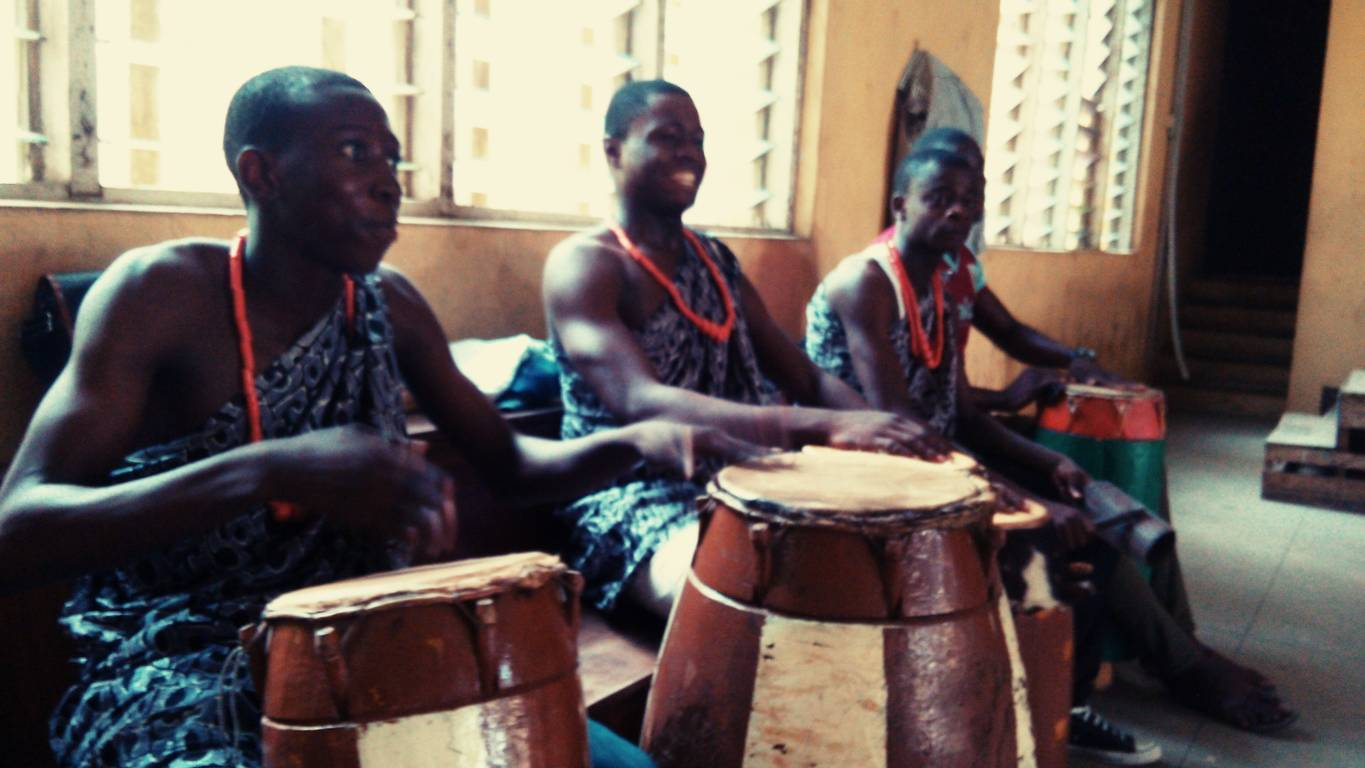
Gbedu drummers

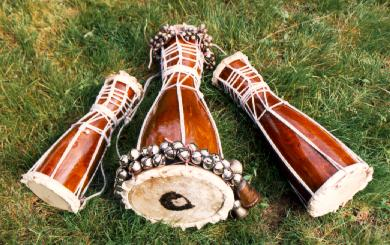
The Batá drum – from left: Okónkolo, Iyá, Itótele

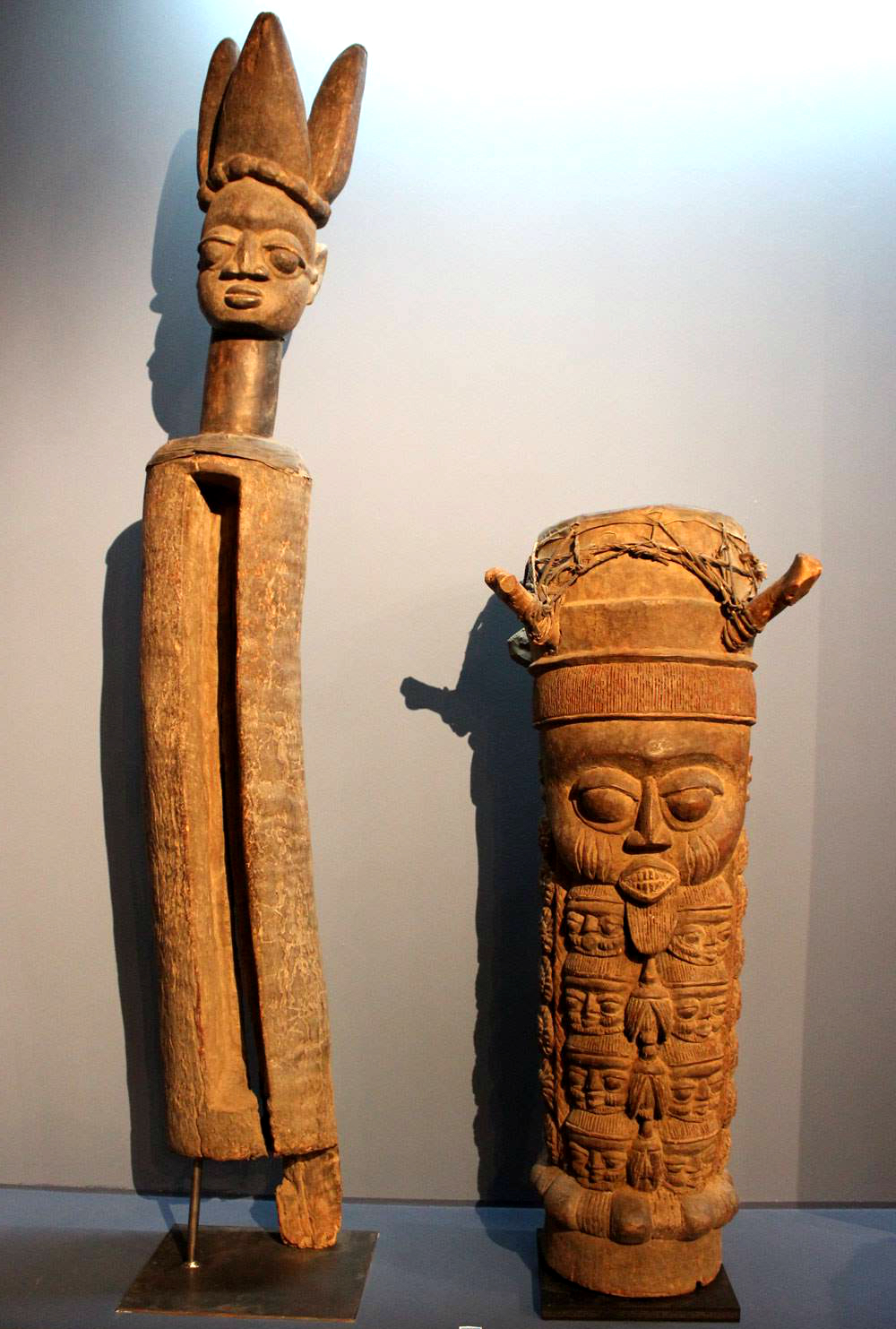
A Yoruba slit drum (on the left) together with a traditional membrane drum (on the right)

The music of the Yoruba people is perhaps best known for an extremely advanced drumming tradition, especially using the dundun hourglass tension drums. The representation of musical instruments on sculptural works from Ile-Ife, indicates, in general terms a substantial accord with oral traditions. A lot of these musical instruments date back to the classical period of Ile-Ife, which began at around the tenth century AD Some were already present prior to this period, while others were created later. The hourglass tension drum (Dùndún) for example, may have been introduced around the 15th century (1400s), the Benin bronze plaques of the middle period depicts them. Others like the double and single iron clapper-less bells are examples of instruments that preceded classical Ife. Yoruba folk music became perhaps the most prominent kind of West African music in Afro-Latin and Caribbean musical styles. Yoruba music left an especially important influence on the music of Trinidad, the Lukumi religious traditions, Capoeira practice in Brazil and the music of Cuba.

Yoruba drums typically belong to four major families, which are used depending on the context or genre where they are played. The Dùndún / Gángan family, is the class of hourglass shaped talking drums, which imitate the sound of Yoruba speech. This is possible because the Yoruba language is tonal in nature. It is the most common and is present in many Yoruba traditions, such as Apala, Jùjú, Sekere and Afrobeat. The second is the Sakara family. Typically, they played a ceremonial role in royal settings, weddings and Oríkì recitation; it is predominantly found in traditions such as Sakara music, Were and Fuji music. The Gbedu family (literally, "large drum") is used by secret fraternities such as the Ogboni and royal courts. Historically, only the Oba might dance to the music of the drum. If anyone else used the drum they were arrested for sedition of royal authority. The Gbèdu are conga shaped drums played while they sit on the ground. Akuba drums (a trio of smaller conga-like drums related to the gbèdu) are typically used in afrobeat. The Ogido is a cousin of the gbedu. It is also shaped like a conga but with a wider array of sounds and a bigger body. It also has a much deeper sound than the conga. It is sometimes referred to as the "bass drum". Both hands play directly on the Ogido drum.

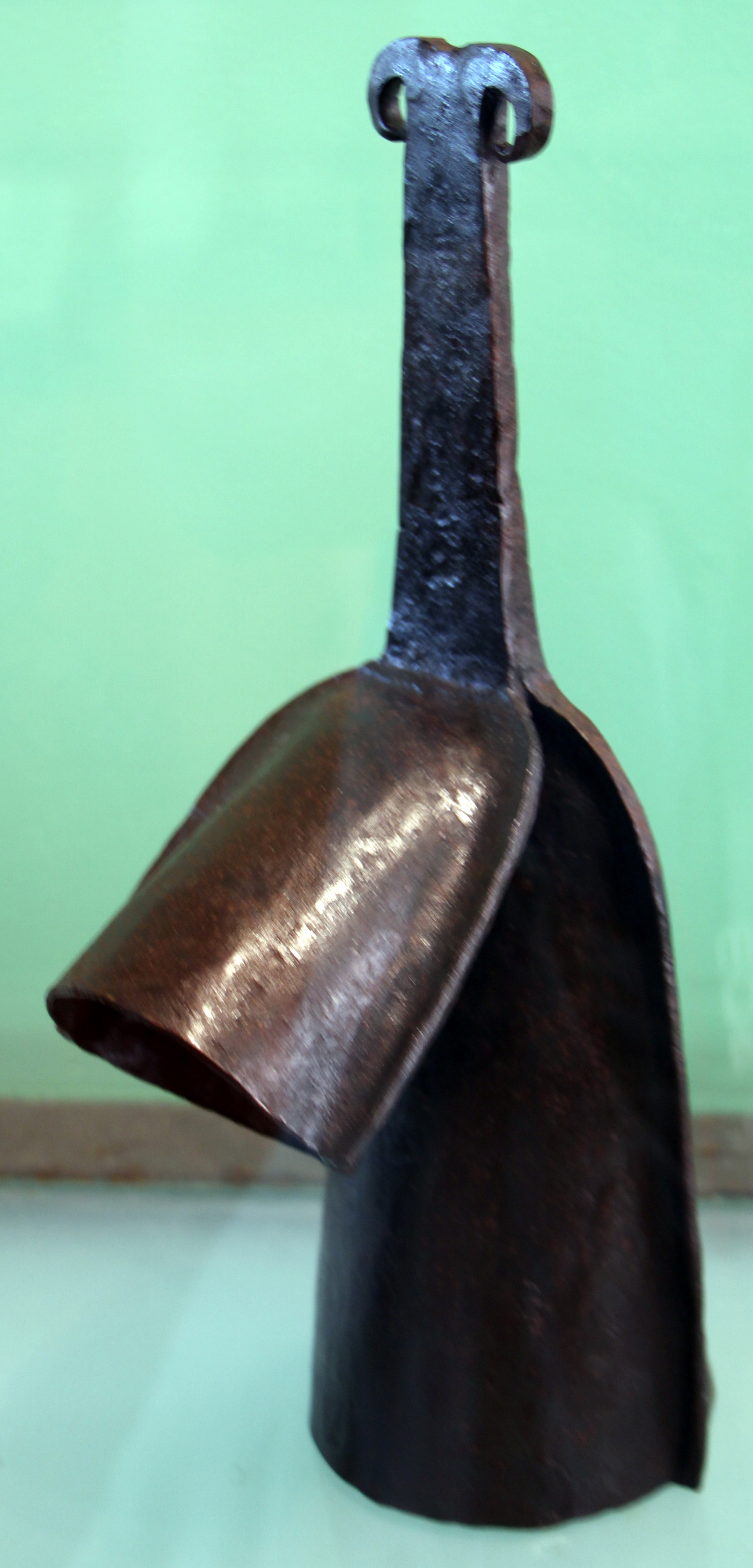
Traditional Agogo metal gongs

Today, the word Gbedu has also come to be used to describe forms of Nigerian Afrobeat and Hip Hop music. The fourth major family of Yoruba drums is the Bàtá family, which are well-decorated double-faced drums, with various tones. They were historically played in sacred rituals. They are believed to have been introduced by Shango, an Orisha, during his earthly incarnation as a warrior king.

Traditional Yoruba drummers are known as Àyán. The Yoruba believe that Àyángalú was the first drummer, one who became the patron Orisha of drumming following his demise. As a result, he is believed to be the spirit or muse that inspires contemporary drummers during renditions. This is why some Yoruba family names contain the prefix 'Ayan-' such as Ayangbade, Ayantunde, Ayanwande. Ensembles using the dundun play a type of music that is also called dundun. The Ashiko (Cone shaped drums), Igbin, Gudugudu (Kettledrums in the Dùndún family), Agidigbo and Bèmbé are other drums of importance. The leader of a dundun ensemble is the oniyalu meaning; ' Owner of the mother drum ', who uses the drum to "talk" by imitating the tonality of Yoruba. Much of this music is spiritual in nature, and is often devoted to the Orisas.

Within each drum family there are different sizes and roles; the lead drum in each family is called Ìyá or Ìyá Ìlù, which means "Mother drum", while the supporting drums are termed Omele. Yoruba drumming exemplifies West-African cross-rhythms and is considered to be one of the most advanced drumming traditions in the world. Generally, improvisation is restricted to master drummers. Some other instruments found in Yoruba music include, but are not limited to; The Gòjé (violin), Shèkèrè (gourd rattle), Agidigbo (thumb piano that takes the shape of a plucked Lamellophone), Saworo (metal rattles for the arm and ankles, also used on the rim of the bata drum), Fèrè (whistles), Aro (Cymbal)s, Agogô (bell), different types of flutes include the Ekutu, Okinkin and Igba.

Oriki (or praise singing), a genre of sung poetry that contains a series of proverbial phrases, praising or characterizing the respective person and which is of Egba and Ekiti origin, is often considered the oldest Yoruba musical tradition. Yoruba music is typically Polyrhythmic, which can be described as interlocking sets of rhythms that fit together somewhat like the pieces in a jigsaw puzzle. There is a basic timeline and each instrument plays a pattern in relation to that timeline. The resulting ensemble provides the typical sound of West African Yoruba drumming. Yoruba music is a component of the modern Nigerian popular music scene. Although traditional Yoruba music was not influenced by foreign music, the same cannot be said of modern-day Yoruba music, which has evolved and adapted itself through contact with foreign instruments, talent, and creativity.

=== Twins in Yoruba society ===
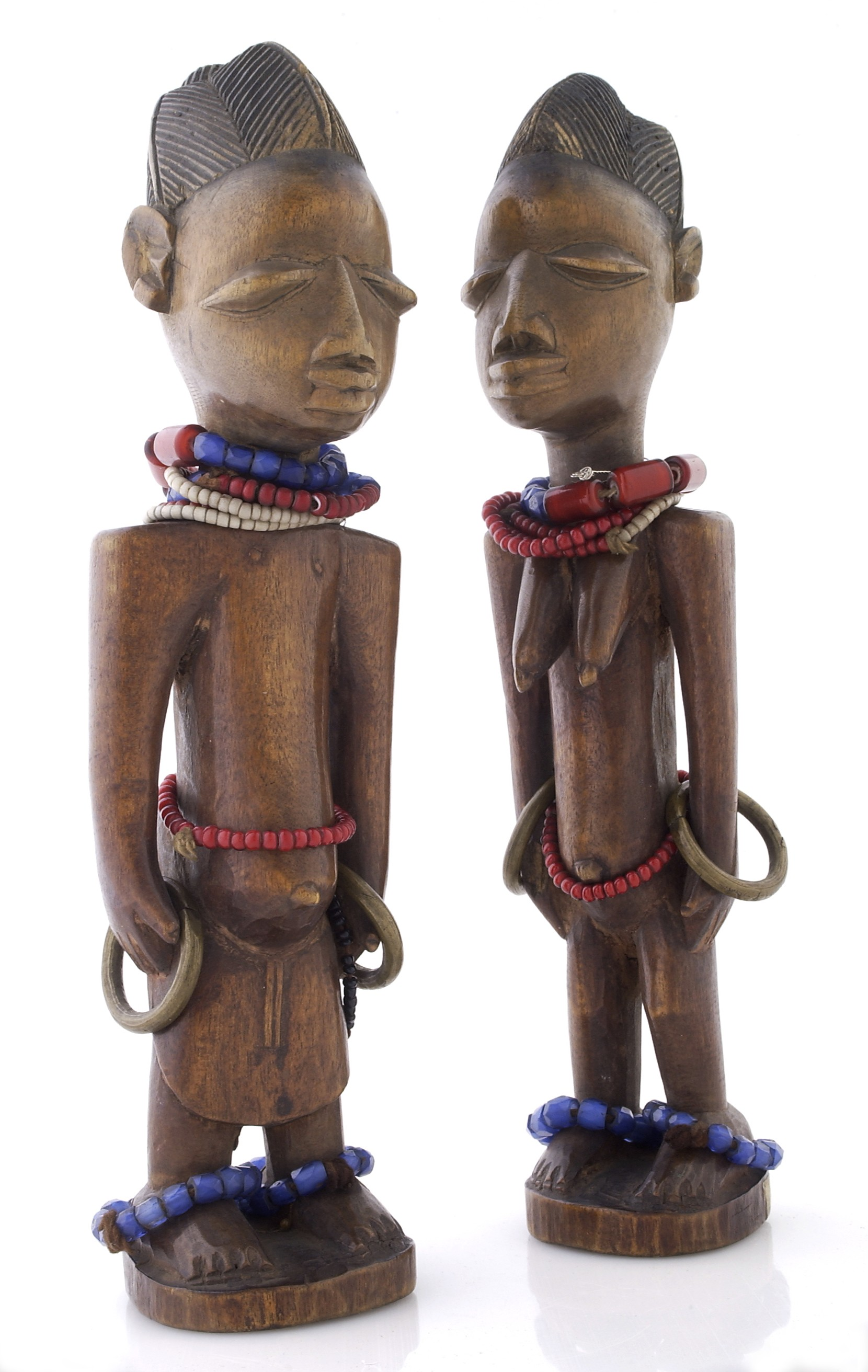
Wooden Ere Ibeji figures representing twins. Yorubas have the highest twinning rate in the world.

The Yoruba present the highest dizygotic twinning rate in the world (4.4% of all maternities). They manifest at 45–50 twin sets (or 90–100 twins) per 1,000 live births, possibly because of high consumption of a specific type of yam containing a natural phytoestrogen that may stimulate the ovaries to release an egg from each side.

Twins are very important for the Yoruba and they usually tend to give special names to each twin. The first of the twins to be born is traditionally named Taiyewo or Tayewo, which means 'the first to taste the world', or the 'slave to the second twin', this is often shortened to Taiwo, Taiye or Taye. Kehinde is the name of the last born twin. Kehinde is sometimes also referred to as Kehindegbegbon, which is short for; Omo kehin de gba egbon and means, 'the child that came behind gets the rights of the elder'.

Twins are perceived as having spiritual advantages or as possessing magical powers. This is different from some other cultures, which interpret twins as dangerous or unwanted.

=== Calendar ===
Time is measured in "ọgán" or "ìṣẹ́jú-àáyá" (seconds), ìṣẹ́jú (minutes), wákàtí (hours), ọjọ́ (days), ọ̀sẹ̀ (weeks), oṣù (months) and ọdún (years). There are 60 (ọgọta) ìṣẹ́jú in 1 (okan) wákàtí; 24 (merinleogun) wákàtí in 1 (okan) ọjọ́; 7 (meje) ọjọ́ in 1 (okan) ọ̀sẹ̀; 4 (merin) ọ̀sẹ̀ in 1 (okan) oṣù and 52 (mejilelaadota) ọ̀sẹ̀ in 1 (okan)ọdún. There are 12 (mejila) oṣù in 1 ọdún.

Approximate relation between Yoruba months and Gregorian months
Months in Yoruba calendar:	Months in Gregorian calendar:
Ṣẹrẹ	January
Erélé	February
Erénà	March
Igbe	April
Èbìbí	May
Okúdù	June
Agẹmọ	July
Ògún	August
Owérè (Owéwè)	September
Ọwàrà (Owawa)	October
Belu	November
Ọ̀pẹ	December

The Yoruba week consists of four days. Traditionally, the Yoruba count their week starting from the Ojó Ògún, this day is dedicated to Ògún. The second day is Ojó Jákúta, the day is dedicated to Sàngó. The third day is known as the Ojó Òsè – this day is dedicated to Òrìshà ńlá (Obàtálá), while the fourth day is the Ojó Awo, in honour of Òrúnmìlà.

Yoruba calendar traditional days
Days:
Ojó Ògún (Ògún)
Ojó Jákúta (Shàngó)
Ojó Òsè (Òrìshà ńlá / Obàtálá)
Ojó Awo (Òrúnmìlà / Ifá)

The Yoruba calendar (Kojoda) year starts from 3 to 2 June of the following year. According to this calendar, the Gregorian year 2021 is the 10,063th year of Yoruba culture, which starts with the creation of Ìfẹ̀ in 8042 BC To reconcile with the Gregorian calendar, Yoruba people also often measure time in seven days a week and four weeks a month:

Modified days in Yoruba calendar	Days in Gregorian calendar
Ọjọ́-Àìkú	Sunday
Ọjọ́-Ajé	Monday
Ọjọ́-Ìṣẹ́gun	Tuesday
Ọjọ́-'Rú	Wednesday
Ọjọ́-Bọ̀	Thursday
Ọjọ́-Ẹtì	Friday
Ọjọ́-Àbámẹ́ta	Saturday

=== Cuisine ===
Yoruba food involves a variety of crops and methods, including boiling, steaming, frying and roasting and barbecue. Okele, a group of solid food pounded or prepared with hot water, are basic staple foods of the Yoruba eaten with soups and stews. These foods are all by-products of crops like cassava, yams, cocoyam. Others like plantain, corn, and rice also feature. In Yoruba cuisine, rice, beans, vegetables, meat, and fish are also chief ingredients in cooking.

Some common Yoruba foods are iyan (pounded yam), amala, eba, semo, fufu, (generally called "Okele"), moin moin (bean cake), and akara. Soups which include egusi, ewedu, efo, okra, and all sorts of locally grown vegetables are also very common as part of the Yoruba diet. Items like rice and beans (locally called ewa) are also featured. Some dishes are prepared for festivities and ceremonies, such as jollof rice and fried rice. Other popular dishes are ekuru, stews, corn, cassava and flours – e.g. maize, yam, plantain and beans, eggs, chicken, beef and assorted forms of meat (ponmo is made from cow skin). Some less well known meals and many miscellaneous staples are arrowroot gruel, sweetmeats, fritters, and coconut concoctions; and some breads – yeast bread, rock buns, and palm wine bread amongst others.

Yoruba cultural dishes

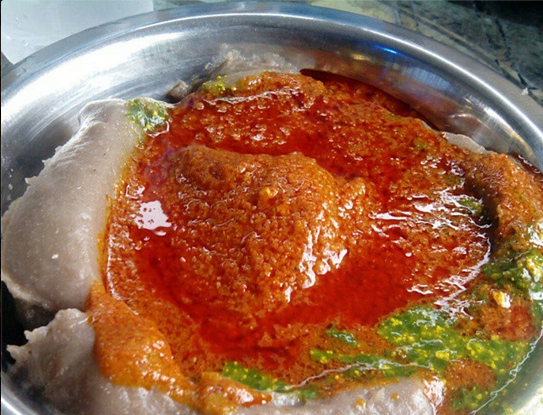
Amala is a Yoruba food.

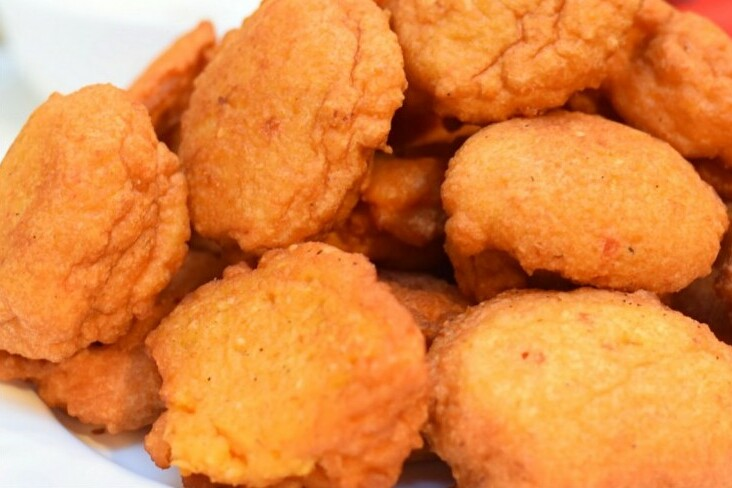
Akara is a Yoruba bean fritter.

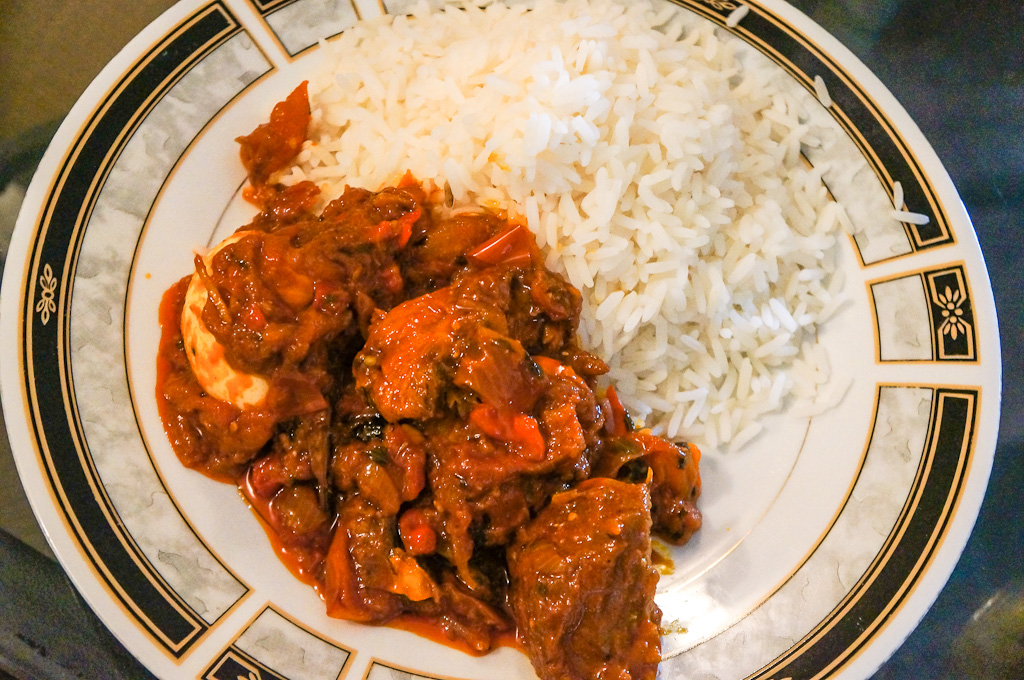
Ofada rice is a Yoruba dish.

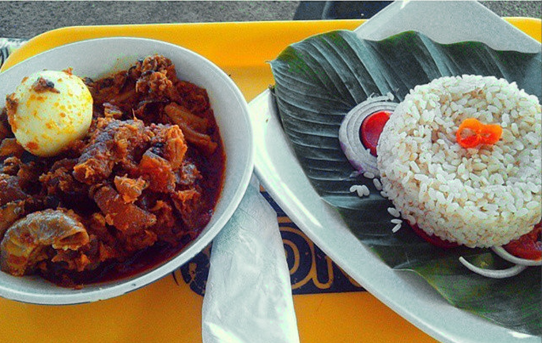
Ofada rice is traditionally in a leaf.

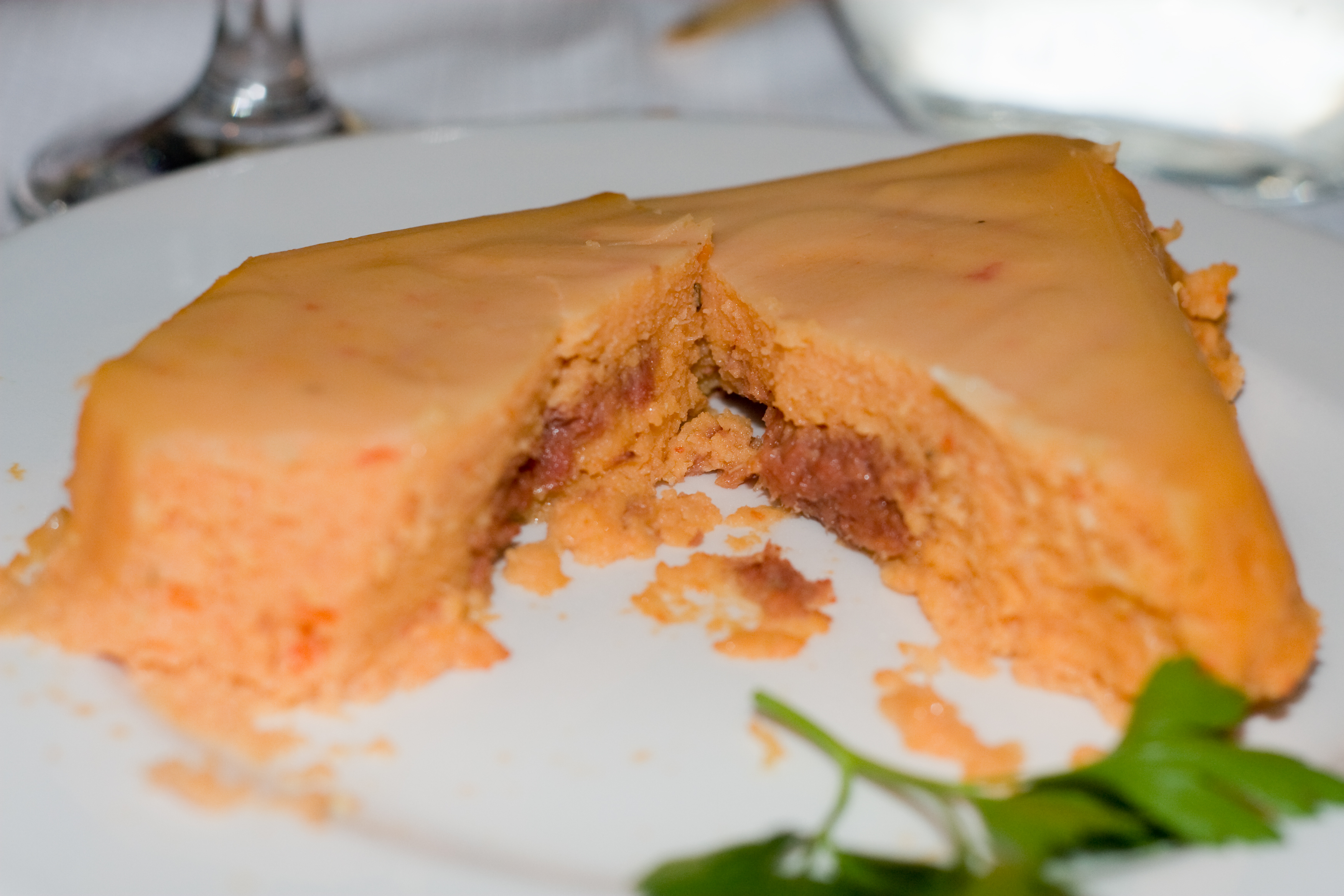
Moin moin is a Yoruba steamed bean pudding.

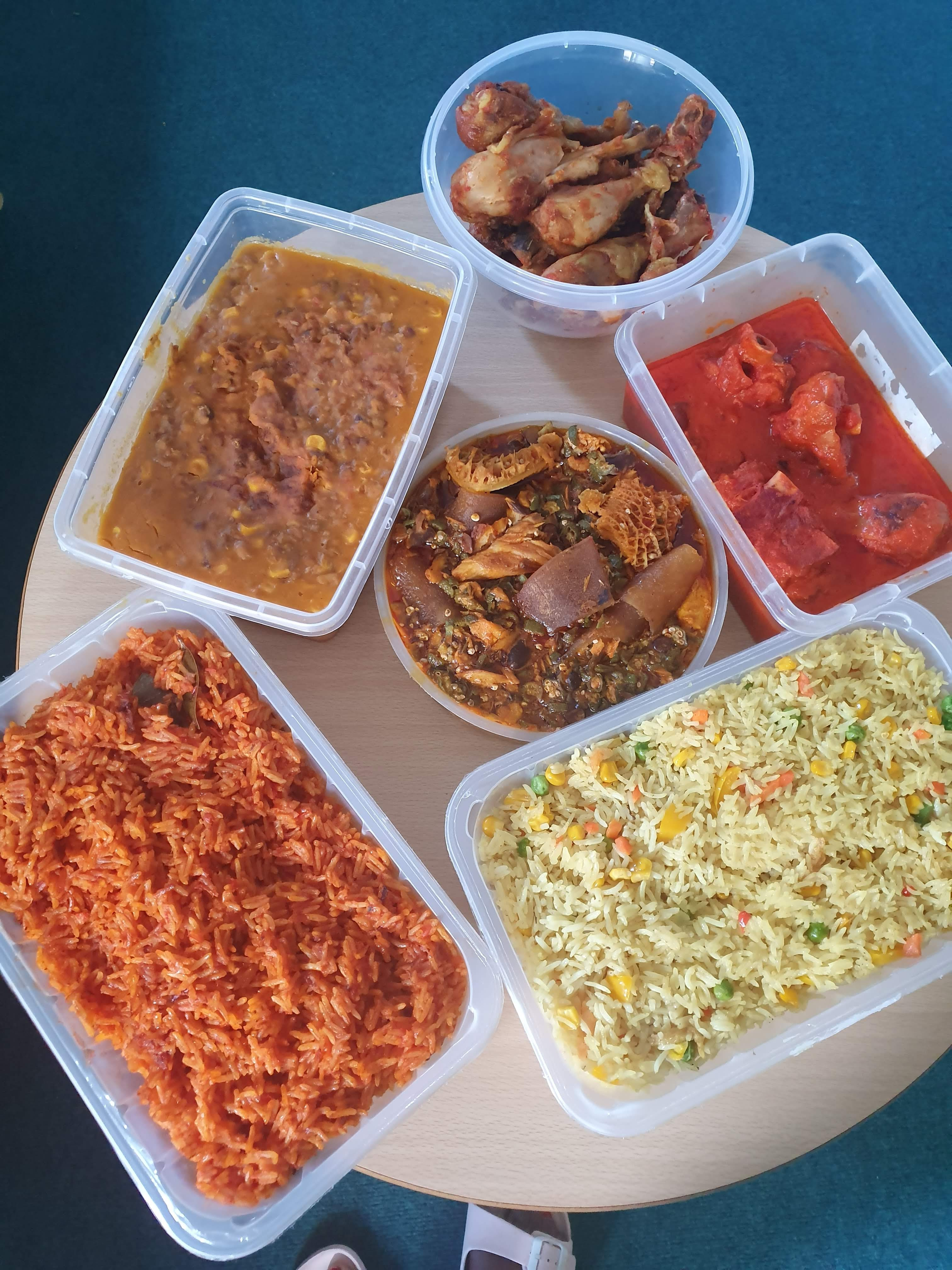
A collection of foods eaten by Yorubas in general

== Dress and body ornamentation ==
Some common Yoruba cultural wear

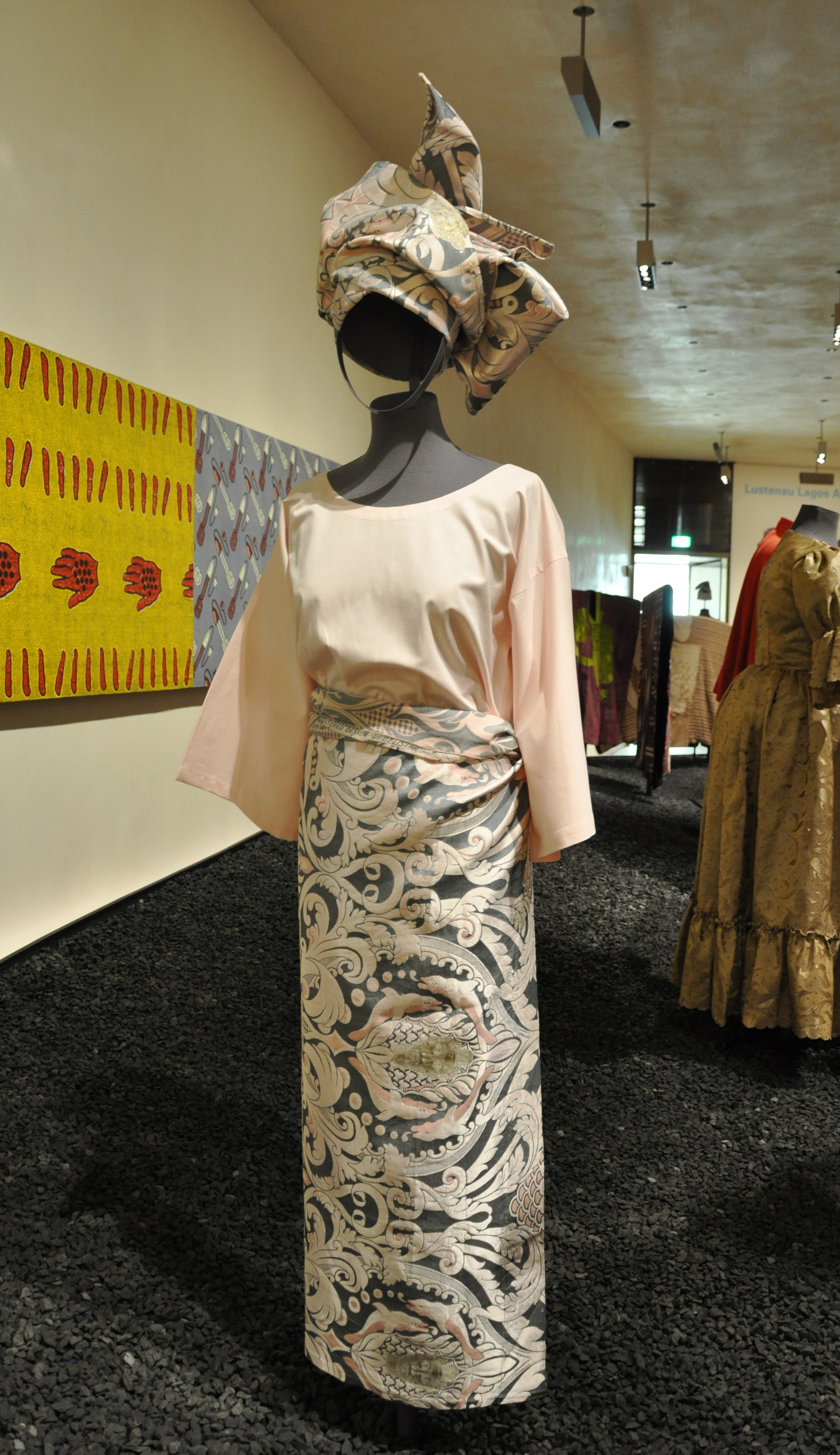
Simple Iro and Buba with Gele

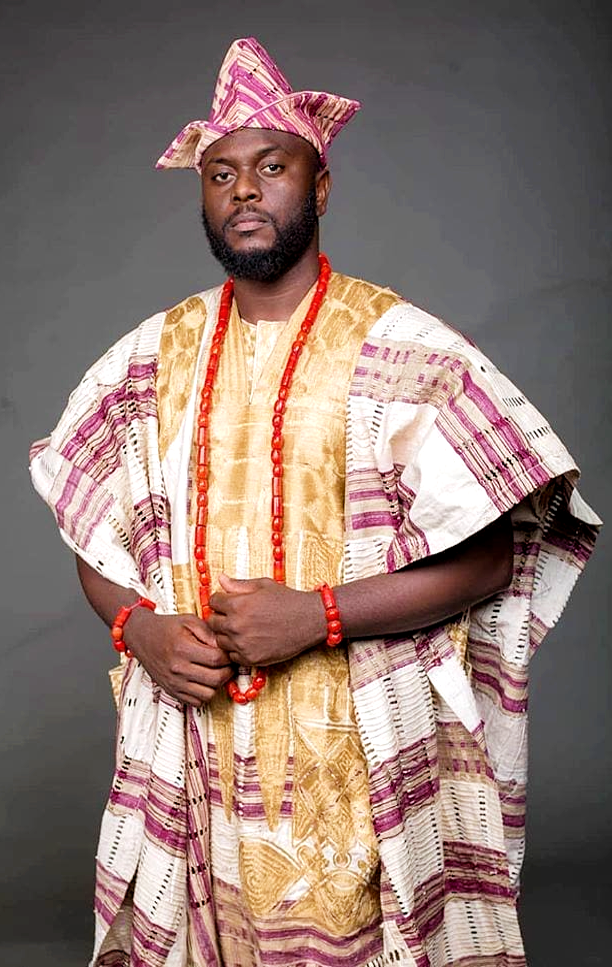
Agbádá àti Fìlà

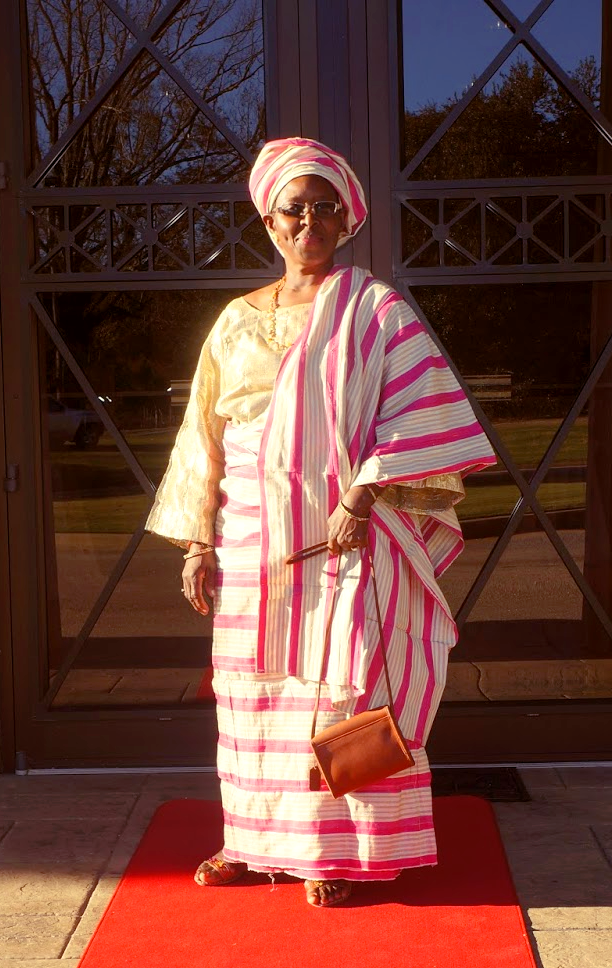
Iro and Bùbá, with Gele and Ipele. Blouse, wrapper and headgear

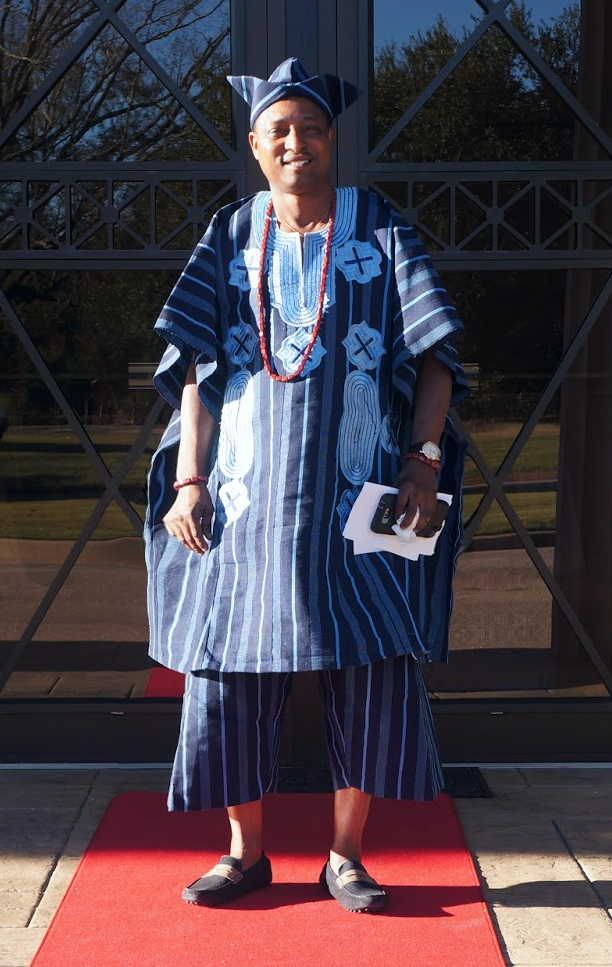
Bùbá àti Kèmbè. Agbada top with short baggy pants

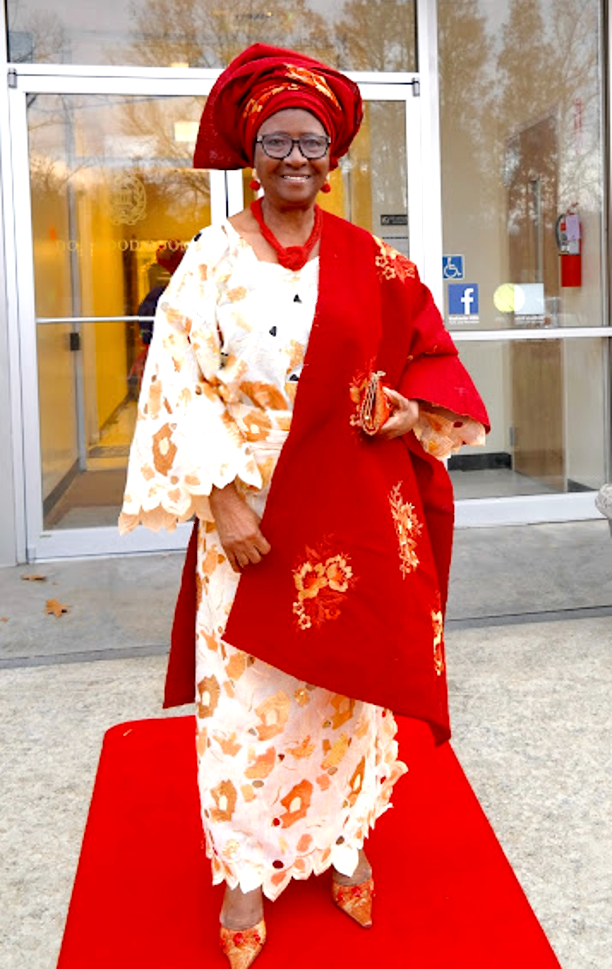
Iro and Bùbá, with Gele and Ipele made from Òfì

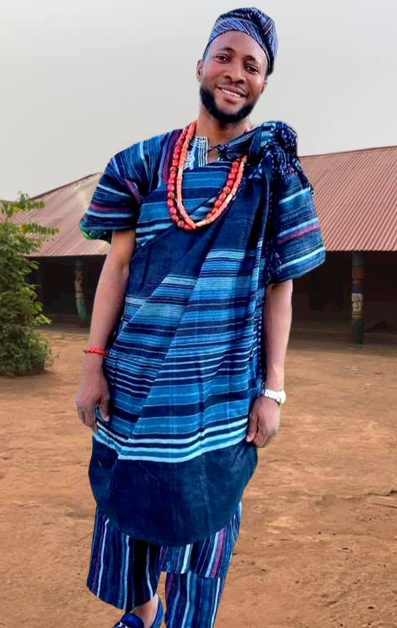
Kájà and Kẹmbẹ, A toga-like style. Kájà is thrown over the body as Pakájà

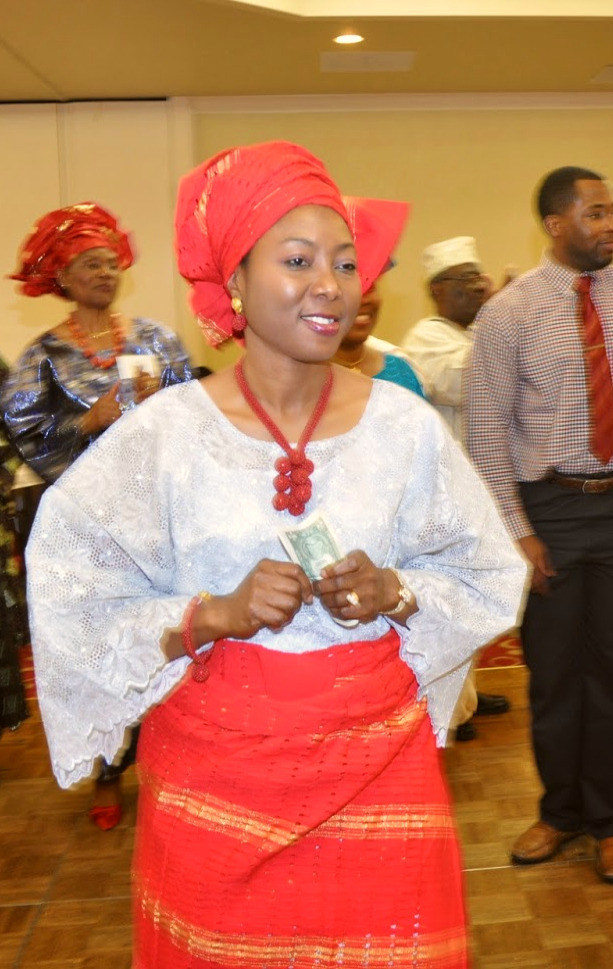
Ìró and Bùbá with gele

The Yoruba take immense pride in their attire, for which they are well known. Clothing materials traditionally come from processed cotton by traditional weavers. They also believe that the type of clothes worn by a man depicts his personality and social status, and that different occasions require different clothing outfits.

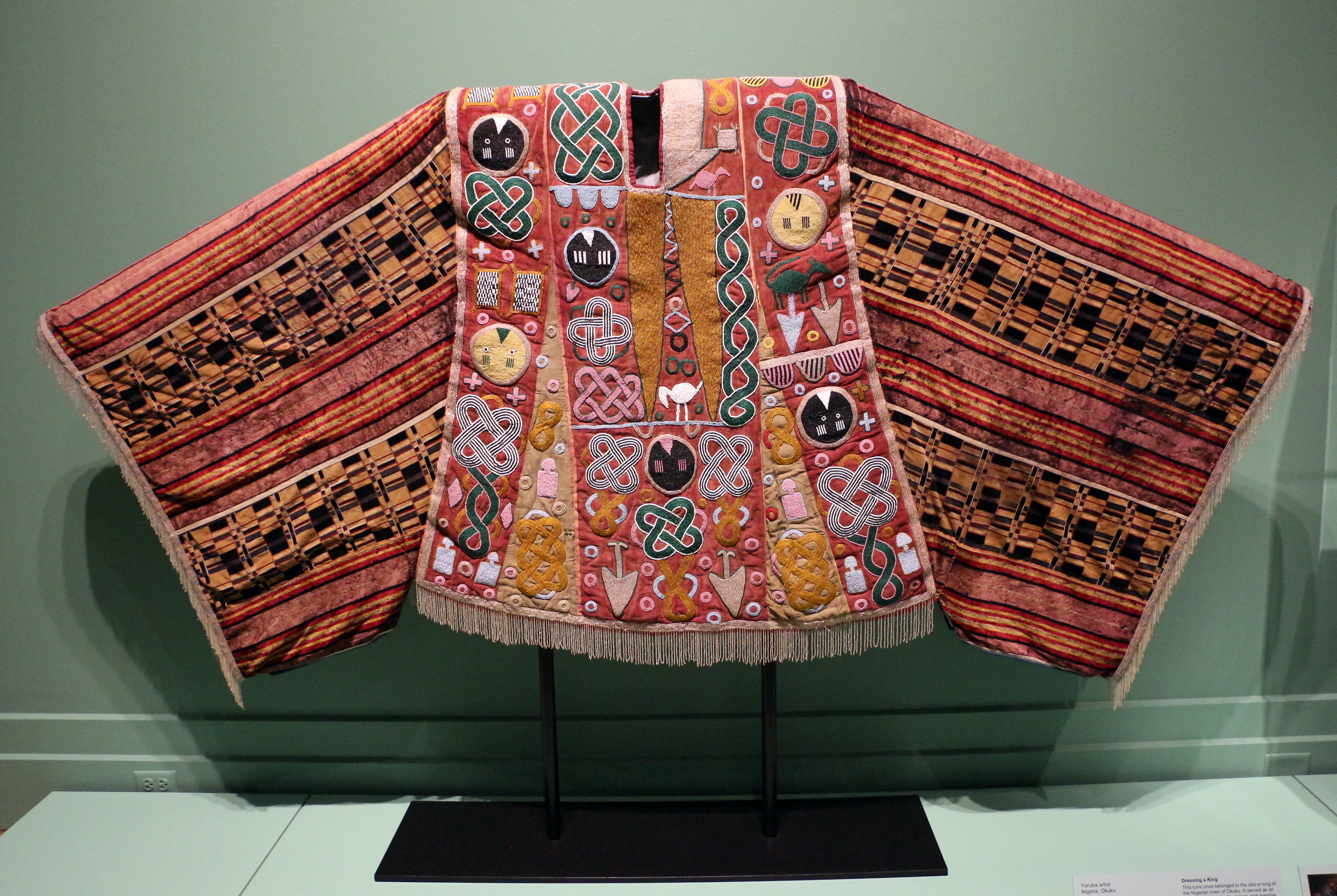
An older traditional Agbada clothing historically worn by Yoruba men. This exhibit was obtained in the town of Òkukù.

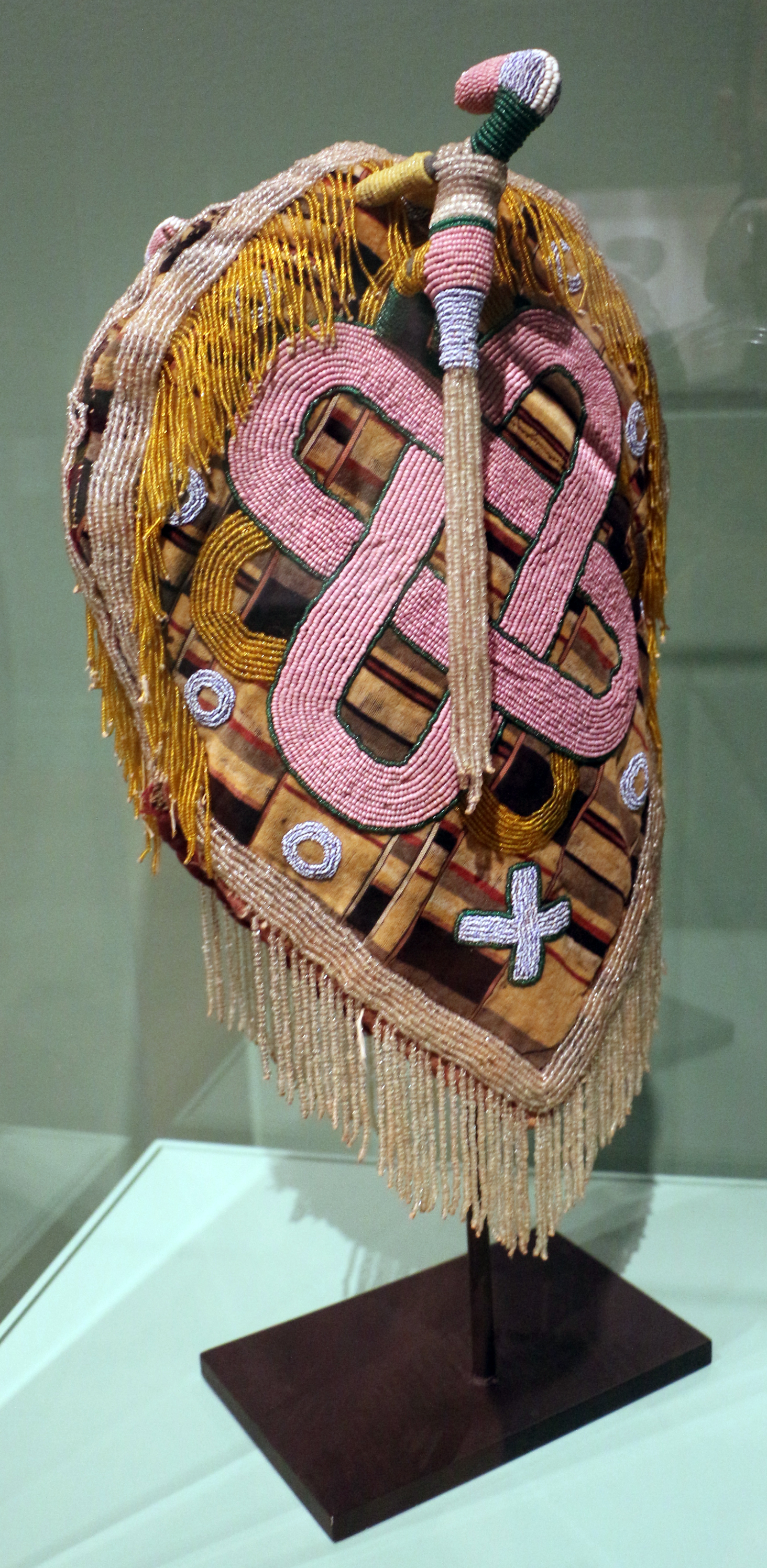
An Àkẹtè, outdoor cap that tapers off at angles.

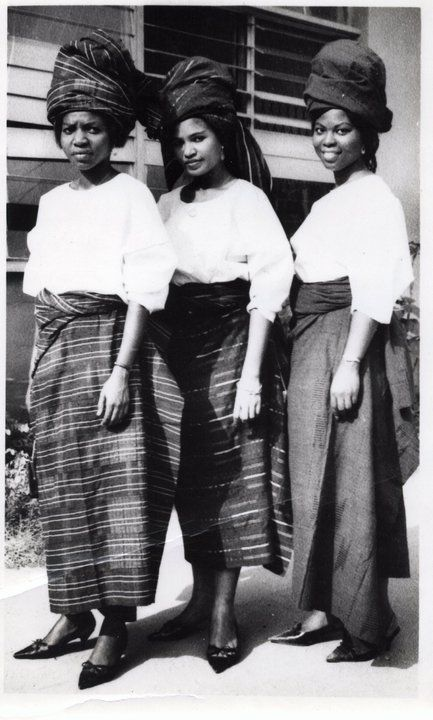
Yoruba ladies, wearing aso oke, 1961, Nigeria

Typically, the Yoruba have a very wide range of materials used to make clothing, the most basic being the Aṣo-Oke, which is a hand loomed cloth of different patterns and colors sewn into various styles. This comes in very many different colors and patterns. Aso Oke comes in three major styles based on pattern and coloration;

- Alaari – a rich red Aṣọ-Oke,
- Sanyan – a brown and usual light brown Aṣọ-Oke, and
- Ẹtu – a dark blue Aṣọ-Oke.

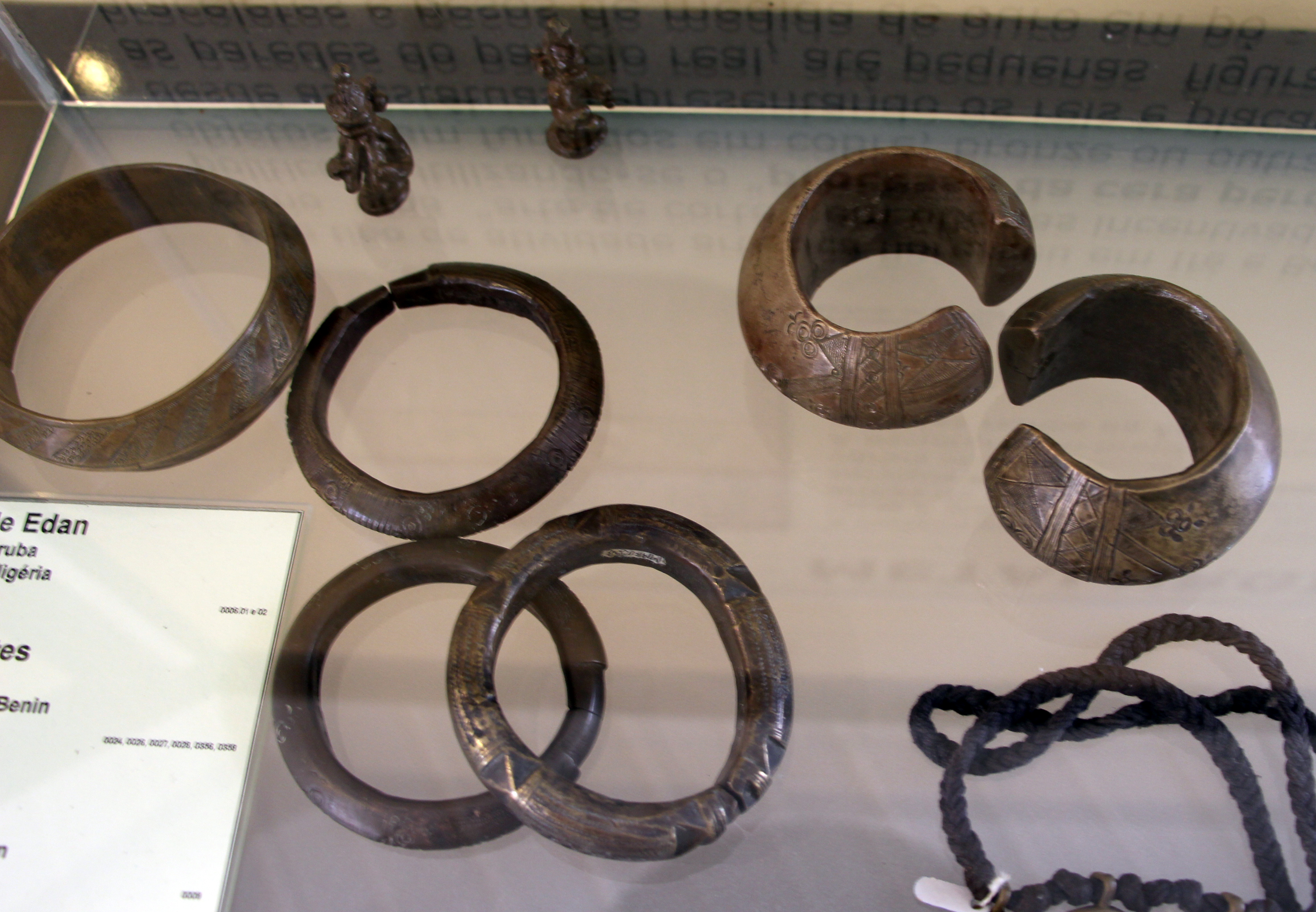
Yoruba metal bracelets and jewellery of old. Collection of The Afro-Brazilian museum of Salvador, Bahia

Other clothing materials include but are not limited to:

- Ofi – pure white yarned cloths, used as cover cloth, it can be sewn and worn.
- Aran – a velvet clothing material of silky texture sewn into Danṣiki and Kẹmbẹ, worn by the rich.
- Adirẹ – cloth with various patterns and designs, dye in indigo ink (Ẹlu or Aro).

Clothing in Yoruba culture is gender sensitive, despite a tradition of non-gender conforming families. For menswear, they have Bùbá, Esiki and Sapara, which are regarded as Èwù Àwòtélè or underwear, while they also have Dandogo, Agbádá, Gbariye, Sulia and Oyala, which are also known as Èwù Àwòlékè / Àwòsókè or overwear. Some fashionable men may add an accessory to the Agbádá outfit in the form of a wraparound (Ìbora).

They also have various types of Sòkòtò or native trousers that are sewn alongside the above-mentioned dresses. Some of these are Kèmbè (Three-Quarter baggy pants), Gbáanu, Sóóró (Long slim / streamlined pants), Káamu and Sòkòtò Elemu. A man's dressing is considered incomplete without a cap (Fìlà). Some of these caps include, but are not limited to, Gobi (Cylindrical, which when worn may be compressed and shaped forward, sideways, or backward), Tinko, Abetí-ajá (Crest-like shape that derives its name from its hanging flaps that resembles a dog's hanging ears. The flaps can be lowered to cover the ears in cold weather, otherwise, they are upwardly turned in normal weather), Alagbaa, Oribi, Bentigoo, Onide, and Labankada (a bigger version of the Abetí-ajá, and is worn in such a way as to reveal the contrasting color of the cloth used as underlay for the flaps).

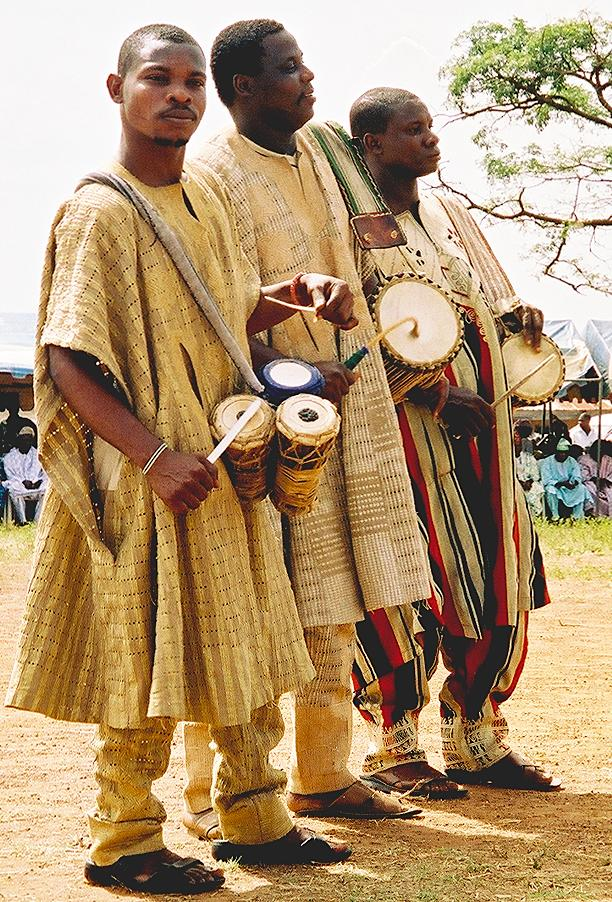
Yoruba drummers, wearing very basic traditional clothing

Women also have different types of dresses. The most commonly worn are Ìró (wrapper) and Bùbá (blouse-like loose top). Women also have matching Gèlè (headgear) that must be put on whenever the Ìró and Bùbá is on. Just as the cap (Fìlà) is important to men, women's dressing is considered incomplete without Gèlè. It may be of plain cloth or costly as the women can afford. Apart from this, they also have ìborùn (Shawl) and Ìpèlé (which are long pieces of fabric that usually hang on the left shoulder and stretch from the hind of the body to the fore). At times, it is tied round their waists over the original one piece wrapper. Unlike men, women have two types of underwear (Èwù Àwòtélè), called; Tòbi and Sinmí. Tòbi is like the modern day apron with strings and spaces in which women can keep their valuables. They tie the tòbi around the waists before putting on the Ìró (wrapper). Sinmí is like a sleeveless T-shirt that is worn under before wearing any other dress on the upper body.

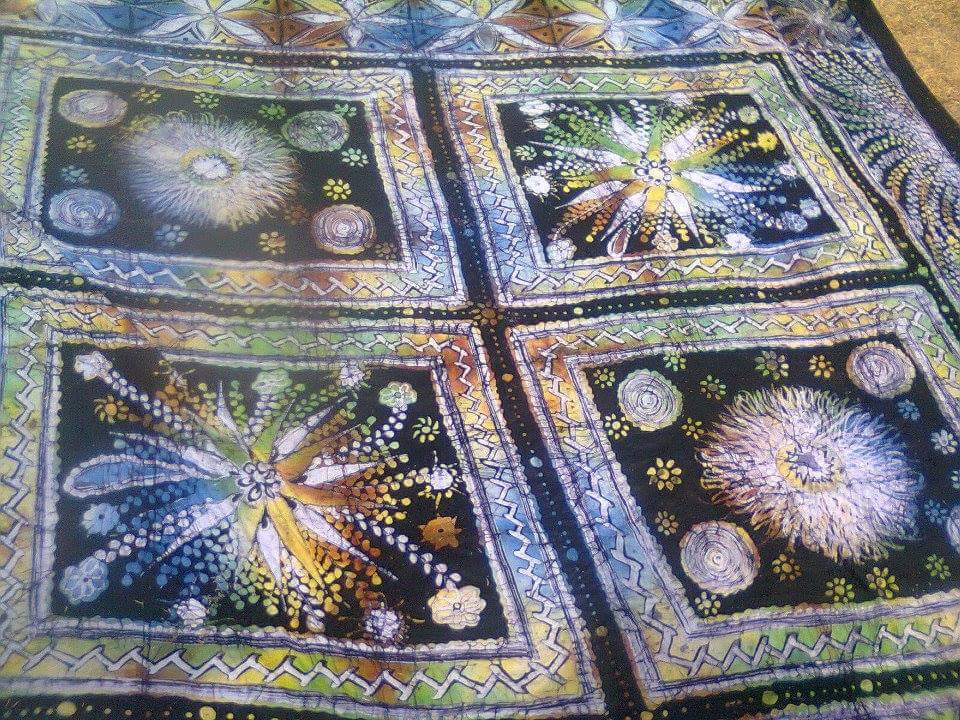
Finished Adire clothing material

There are many types of beads (Ìlèkè), hand laces, necklaces (Egba orùn), anklets (Egba esè) and bangles (Egba owó) that are used in Yorubaland. These are used by both males and females, and are put on for bodily adornment. Chiefs, priests, kings or people of royal descent, especially use some of these beads as a signifier of rank. Some of these beads include Iyun, Lagidigba, Àkún etc. An accessory especially popular among royalty and titled Babalawos / Babalorishas is the Ìrùkèrè, which is an artistically processed animal tail, a type of Fly-whisk. The horsetail whiskers are symbols of authority and stateliness. It can be used in a shrine for decoration but most often is used by chief priests and priestesses as a symbol of their authority or Ashe. As most men go about with their hair lowly cut or neatly shaven, the reverse is the case for women. Hair is considered the ' Glory of the woman '. They usually take care of their hair in two major ways; plaiting and weaving. There are many types of plaiting styles, and women readily pick any type they want. Some of these include kòlésè, Ìpàkó-elédè, Sùkú, Kojúsóko, Alágogo, Konkoso, etc. Traditionally, the Yoruba consider tribal marks ways of adding beauty to the face of individuals. This is apart from the fact that they show clearly from which part of Yorubaland an individual comes from, since different areas are associated with different marks. Different types of tribal marks are made with local blades or knives on the cheeks. These are usually done at infancy, when children are not pain conscious. Some of these tribal marks include Pélé, Abàjà-Ègbá, Abàjà-Òwu, Abàjà-mérin, Kéké, Gòmbò, Ture, Pélé Ifè, Kéké Òwu, Pélé Ìjèbú etc. Not everyone back in the past had tribal marks and sometimes it was given to first borns of a household or for some reason or the other. So, many did not have one. This practice is near extinct today.

The Yoruba believe that development of a nation is akin to the development of a man or woman. Therefore, the personality of an individual has to be developed to fulfil his or her responsibilities. Clothing among the Yoruba people is a crucial factor upon which the personality of an individual is anchored. This belief is anchored in Yoruba proverbs. Different occasions also require different outfits among the Yoruba.

== Demographics ==
=== Benin ===
Estimates of the Yoruba in Benin vary from around 1.3 to 1.6 million people. The Yoruba are the main group in the Benin department of Ouémé, all Subprefectures including Porto Novo (Ajasè), Adjara; Collines Province, all subprefectures including Savè, Dassa-Zoume, Bante, Tchetti, Gouka; Plateau Province, all Subprefectures including Kétou, Sakété, Pobè; Borgou Province, Tchaourou Subprefecture including Tchaourou; Donga Province, Bassila Subprefecture.

Places

The chief Yoruba cities or towns in Benin are: Porto-Novo (Ajase), Ouèssè (Wese), Ketu, Savé (Tchabe), Tchaourou (Shaworo), Bantè-Akpassi, Bassila, Adjarra, Adja-Ouèrè (Aja Were), Sakété (Itchakete), Ifangni (Ifonyi), Pobè, Dassa (Idatcha), Glazoue (Gbomina), Ipinle, Aledjo-Koura, Aworo etc.

=== Ghana ===
There exists an old and thriving Yoruba community in Ghana tracing back to more than three centuries of establishment. The presence of Yoruba people in Ghana traces back to before the concept of the modern Ghanaian nation and are therefore Ghanaian citizens by law. The Yoruba communities became established through various waves and layers for centuries before the colonial era. The earliest wave were long distance merchants, artisans, labourers and explorers who settled in both southern and northern Ghanaian locales such as Salaga, Sekondi-Takoradi, Kumasi, Accra (Jamestown, Ngleshie Alata, Tudu), Yendi, Tamale, Kintampo, Nandom. In Ngleshie Alata (A corruption of English ' Alata ', the Fante and Ga word for Yoruba people based on the region where the majority came from) and the area around the James Fort, the Yoruba presence dates back to 1673 when they were employed to build the fort and settled in large numbers on the eastern coastal region. It is on record that the first 'Alata Akutso Mantse ' or Alata division head, a Yoruba speaker named Ojo employed by the Royal African Company ascended an Accra royal stool becoming head of the Alata quarter of James Town in 1748, a position his descendants continue to hold to this very day.

In the popular 18th century Gonja Salaga Slave Market, the Yoruba residents of the town would not allow their fellow countrymen captured and brought to the markets to be sold to the Ashantis who would march them to the coast. Rather, they would barter for the release of the Yoruba captives who would in turn work for their benefactors as tradesmen until they earned their release. This earliest wave was followed by an intermediate wave of slave returnees who were predominantly of Yoruba descent like the Taboms/Agudas who settled along the Ghanaian coast. Then came the third wave who came during the Gold Coast colonial period. By this period, they had firmly entrenched themselves in the country's commerce and distribution systems and constituted a substantial percentage of merchants and traders in the country's large markets as proprietors of wholesale enterprises. They were the largest group of immigrants established in the pre-independence Gold Coast. In 1950 they constituted 15% of traders in Accra, 23% in Kumasi, and over a third in Tamale. They were usually referred to in southern Ghana as Yoruba, Lagosian, Alata, or Anago. It was the early stream of this wave in the 1830s that established places like Accra New Town which was previously known as Lagos town and before then as Araromi.

There is no codification for the Yoruba ethnicity in the most recent Ghanaian censuses but in previous ones, they were considered an indigenous Ghanaian group with origins outside modern Ghana. In the 1960 Ghanaian population census, there were 109,090 Yorubas. Of this figure; 100,560 were Yoruba 'proper ' while 8,530 were Atakpame (Ana). This represented 1.6% of the Ghanaian population.

=== Nigeria ===
The Yorubas are the main ethnic group in the Nigerian states of Ekiti, Ogun, Ondo, Osun, Kwara, Oyo, Lagos, and in the Western Third of Kogi State, and can be found as a minority population to varying proportions in Delta and Edo.

=== Togo ===
Estimates of the Yoruba in Togo vary from around 500,000 to 600,000 people. There are both immigrant Yoruba communities from Nigeria, and indigenous ancestral Yoruba communities living in Togo. Footballer Emmanuel Adebayor is an example of a Togolese from an immigrant Yoruba background. Indigenous Yoruba communities in Togo, however can be found in the Togolese departments of Plateaux Region, Anie, Ogou and Est-Mono prefectures; Centrale Region (Tchamba Prefecture). The chief Yoruba cities or towns in Togo are: Atakpame, Anié, Morita (Moretan), Ofe, Elavagnon, Goubi, Kambole, Akpare, Kamina.

=== West Africa (other) ===
The Yoruba in Burkina Faso are numbered around 77,000 people, and around 80,000 in Niger. In the Ivory Coast, they are concentrated in the cities of Abidjan (Treichville, Adjamé), Bouake, Korhogo, Grand Bassam and Gagnoa where they are mostly employed in retail at major markets. Otherwise known as "Anago traders", they dominate certain sectors of the retail economy and number at least 135,000 people.

=== The Yoruba diaspora ===
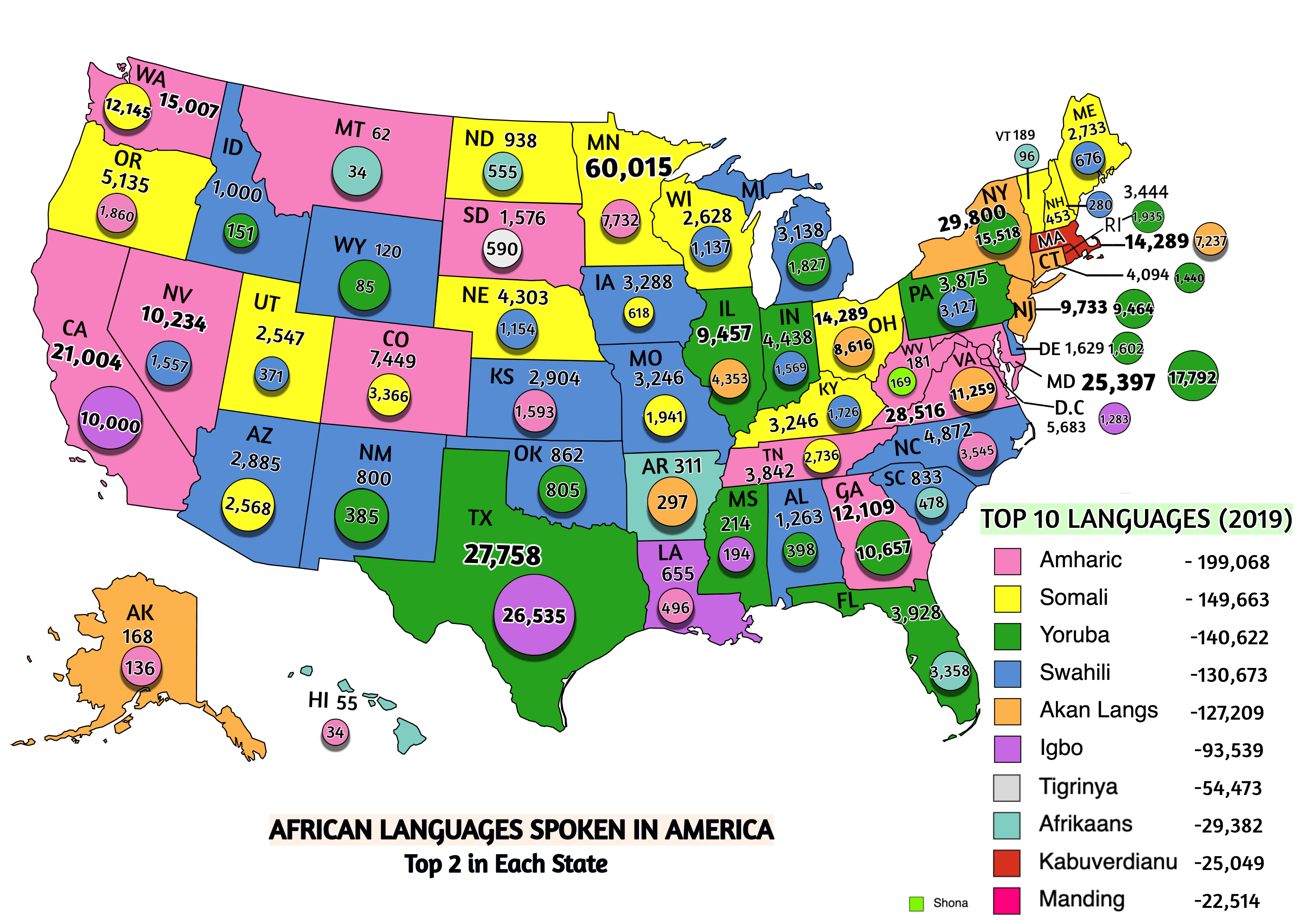
African Languages Spoken in American Households (2019)

Yoruba people or descendants can be found all over the world especially in the United Kingdom, Canada, the United States, Brazil, Latin America, and the Caribbean (especially in Cuba).

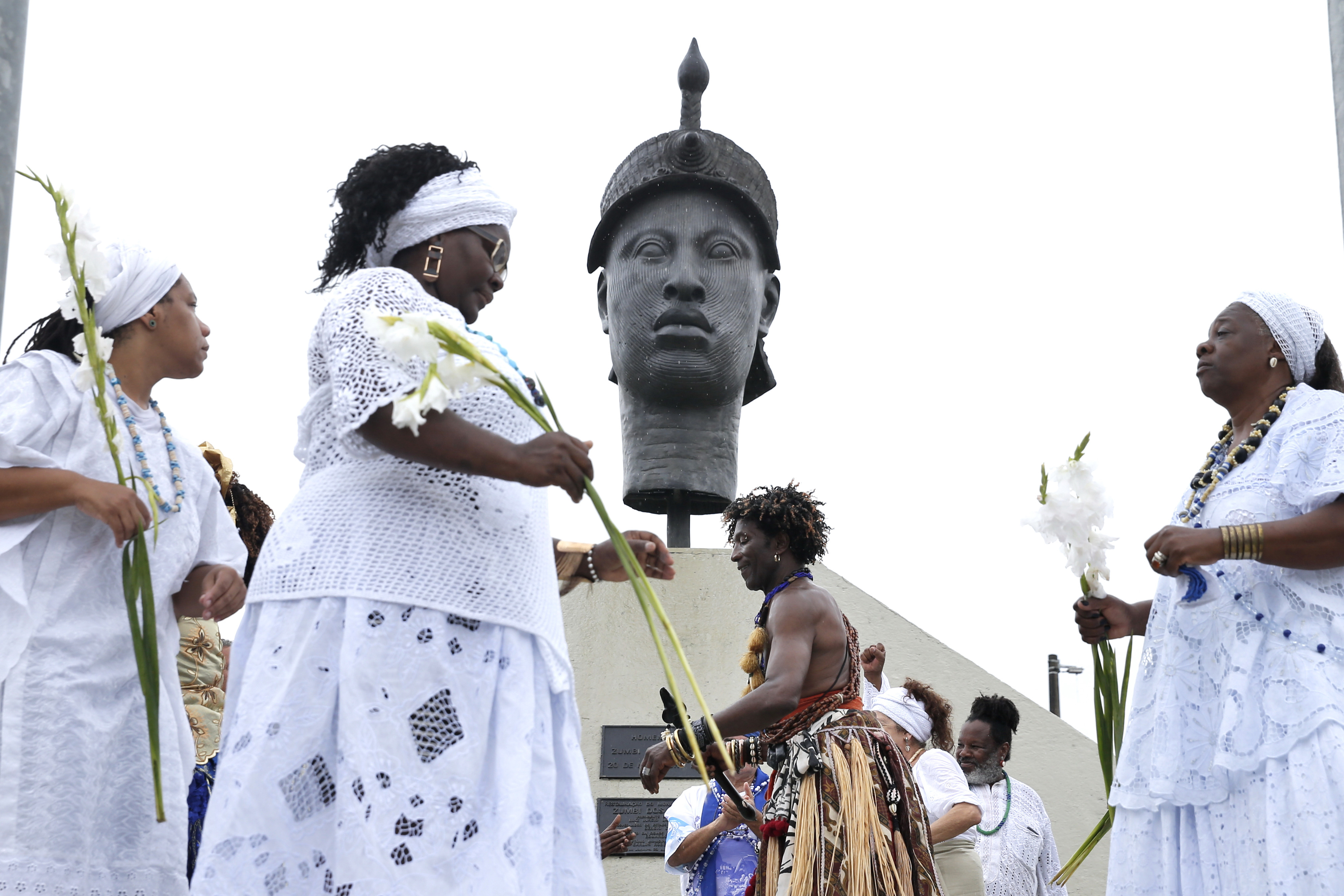
Commemoration of Black consciousness, Rio de Janeiro, Brazil

In the United States, similar to its status on the African continent, the Yoruba language is the most spoken African Niger-Congo language by native speakers. It is the most spoken African language in; Delaware, Florida, Illinois, Indiana, Mississippi, New Hampshire, North Carolina, Pennsylvania, Texas and West Virginia. It constitutes the second largest African linguistic community in; Georgia, Kentucky, Maine, Maryland, Mississippi, New Jersey, New York, Rhode Island and Washington, D.C. with over 207,000 speakers in 2022.

The migration of Yoruba people all over the world has led to a spread of the Yoruba culture across the globe. Yoruba people have historically been spread around the globe by the combined forces of the Atlantic slave trade and voluntary self migration. Their exact population outside Africa is unknown. In their Atlantic world domains, the Yorubas were known by the designations: "Nagos/Anago", "Terranova", "Lucumi" and "Aku", or by the names of their various clans.

The Yoruba left an important presence in Cuba and Brazil, particularly in Havana and Bahia. According to a 19th-century report, "the Yoruba are, still today, the most numerous and influential in this state of Bahia. The most numerous are those from Oyo, capital of the Yoruba kingdom". Others included Ijexa (Ijesha), Lucumi, Ota (Aworis), Ketus, Ekitis, Jebus (Ijebu), Egba, Lucumi Ecumacho (Ogbomosho), and Anagos. In the documents dating from 1816 to 1850, Yorubas constituted 69.1% of all slaves whose ethnic origins were known, constituting 82.3% of all slaves from the Bight of Benin. The proportion of slaves from West-Central Africa (Angola – Congo) dropped drastically to just 14.7%.

Between 1831 and 1852, the African-born slave and free population of Salvador, Bahia surpassed that of free Brazil born Creoles. Meanwhile, between 1808 and 1842 an average of 31.3% of African-born freed persons had been Nagos (Yoruba). Between 1851 and 1884, the number had risen to a dramatic 73.9%.

Other areas that received a significant number of Yoruba people and are sites of Yoruba influence are: The Bahamas, Puerto Rico, the Dominican Republic, Saint Lucia, Grenada, Santa Margarita, Trinidad and Tobago, Belize, Guyana, Haiti, Jamaica (where they settled and established such places as Abeokuta, Naggo head in Portmore, and by their hundreds in other parishes like Hanover and Westmoreland, both in western Jamaica- leaving behind practices such as Ettu from Etutu, the Yoruba ceremony of atonement among other customs of people bearing the same name, and certain aspects of Kumina such as Sango veneration), Barbados, Montserrat, etc.

On 31 July 2020, the Yoruba World Congress joined the Unrepresented Nations and Peoples Organization (UNPO).

== Genetics ==
Genetic studies have shown the Yoruba to cluster most closely with other West African peoples, followed by Central and Eastern African groups speaking Niger-Congo languages.

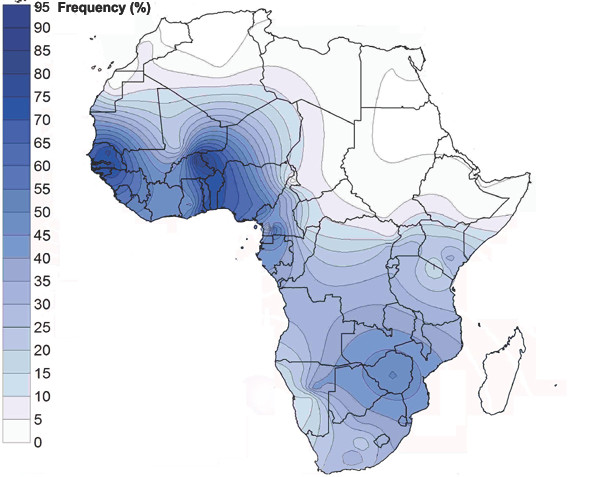
Map showing the average distribution and concentration of the haplogroup E1b1a (E-M2), the most common Sub-Saharan African-associated clade.

Yoruba people belong largely to the E1b1a1 subclade of the E-M2 haplogroup along with the Ewe, Ga, and Bamileke peoples of West Africa and Cameroon. Genetic studies have also found evidence of minute Neanderthal admixture in Yoruba populations at low frequencies, estimated at 0.5% ±0.06% among modern samples. This occurrence is largely assumed to be derived via indirect gene flow from West Eurasian ancestry component among Yorubas which amounts to about 8.6% ±3%. This admixture may have been introduced 7,500–10,500 years ago from North Africa during the Green Saharan period. Another full genome study on African populations found that the Yoruba (Yoruba/Esan cluster of West Africa) received varying degrees of West-Eurasian admixture, although generally at low frequency, indirectly through contact with Northern African pastoralists.

E1b1a1-M2 is the predominant paternal haplogroup in West Africa (70-97%). The gradual movement of the Proto Yoruboid within West-Central Africa may have been associated with the expansion of Sahel agriculture in the African Neolithic period, following the desiccation of the Sahara in c. 3500 BCE.

== Foreign representation ==
The Yoruba people have participated in more recent cultural exchange programs with members of the African diaspora to preserve shared cultural and identity relationships between the two parties. One of these programs is a cultural site, the Oyotunji African Village in Sheldon County, South Carolina, founded by Oba Efuntola Oseijeman Adelabu and established in 1970.

More recent diplomatic efforts centered around Yoruba cross-cultural celebration include the voyage of the Ooni (King) of Ife to the city of Salvador in Bahia, Brazil, home to a large number of Yoruba descendants, to celebrate the city as the cultural capital of the Yoruba people in the Western Hemisphere.

== Yoruba organizations ==
- Afenifere
- Amotekun
- Oodua Peoples Congress

== Issues ==
Along with people of other regions that are largely representative of ethnic enclaves within Nigeria, Yorubas have faced growing concerns over increased insecurity and instability within the country. On 9 January 2020, the governors of 6 of the country's western states became associated with the formation of state security networks which would operate in each state. This security network is called Amotekun and is managed by the office of each state governor with full co-operation of the legal protocols of Nigeria.

== Prominent chiefs ==
- Aare Baasofin
- Aare Ona Kakanfo
- Akoni Oodua
- Alaafin
- Alake
- Alaketu
- Awujale
- Eleko
- Olubadan
- Ooni

== See also ==
- Beninois Yoruba
- Ebira
- Igala people
- Itsekiri people
- Nupe
- Timeline of Yoruba history

== Bibliography ==
- Ogundiran, Akinwumi (2020). The Yoruba: A New History. Indiana University Press. ISBN 9780253051509.
- Akintoye, Stephen (2010). A History of the Yoruba People. Amalion. ISBN 978-2-35926-005-2.
- Bascom, William (1984). The Yoruba of Southwestern Nigeria. Waveland Pr Inc. ISBN 978-0-88133-038-0.
- Blier, Suzanne Preston (2015). Art and Risk in Ancient Yoruba: Ife History, Power, and Identity, c.1300. Cambridge University Press. ISBN 978-1-107-02166-2.
- Falola, Toyin; Childs, Matt D (2005). The Yoruba Diaspora in the Atlantic World. Indiana University Press. ISBN 978-0-253-21716-5.
- Johnson, Samuel (1997). The History of the Yorubas. Paperpack. ISBN 978-978-32292-9-7.
- Law, Robin (1977). The Oyo Empire, c. 1600 – c. 1836: A West African Imperialism in the Era of the Atlantic Slave Trade. Clarendon Press. ISBN 978-0-19-822709-0.
- Lucas, Jonathan Olumide (1996). The Religion of the Yorubas. Athelia Henrietta Press. ISBN 978-0-9638787-8-6.
- Ogunyemi, Yemi D. (2010). The Oral Traditions in Ile-Ife. Academica Press. ISBN 978-1-933146-65-2.
- Olumola, Isola; et al. Prominent Traditional Rulers of Yorubaland, Ibadan 2003.
- Smith, Robert (1988). Kingdoms of the Yoruba. Paperpack. ISBN 978-0-299-11604-0.
