= Beninois Yoruba =

Yoruba ethnic group in Benin Republic

The Beninese or Beninois Yoruba, also referred to as the Yoruba of Benin Republic, are ethnic Yoruba people native to areas primarily situated in southeastern and central Benin. They form part of the larger Yoruba ethnolinguistic group found mainly in southwestern Nigeria but also present in parts of central Togo and the diaspora. In Benin, they are concentrated in the departments of Ouémé, Plateau and Collines with smaller numbers in Borgou, and Donga.

== Distribution ==
The Yoruba are found natively in seven of Benin's twelve Departments, which are the first level administrative divisions of Benin. Just as in Nigeria, they exist in series of cluster groups speaking dialects such as; Ohori (Holli), Isha/Ica, Kura, Shabe/Cabe, Ife (Ana) and more.

Major Yoruba towns in Benin include Porto-Novo, Pobè, Kétou, Sakété, Ifangni, Dassa (Igbo Idaasha), Savé, Glazoue (Gbomina), Tchaourou, Takon, Bante, Adjohoun, Adja-Ouèrè . These communities maintain strong historical and cultural ties with the Yoruba of southwestern Nigeria. The Yoruba language is recognized as one of Benin's national languages, and is spoken chiefly in the southeastern and east-central parts of the country as well as in major urban centres across the country by itinerant trading Yoruba communities.

=== Indiginious Yoruba communities, and their administrative locations ===
Alibori Department

- Kandi
  - Angaradébou
  - Guénè
  - Saah

Borgu Department

- Tchaourou (Shaworo)
  - Papane (Kpakpanin)
  - Wari-Maro

Collines Department

- Bantè
  - Agoua
  - Akpassi
  - Atokoligbé
  - Bobè
  - Gouka
  - Koko
  - Lougba
  - Pira
- Dassa (Igbo Idaatcha) ★
  - Akofodjoulè
  - Kèrè
  - Kpingni
  - Lèma Idaasha
  - Tré
- Glazoue (Gbomina)
  - Gomè
  - Kpakpaza
  - Magoumi
  - Sokponta
  - Zaffé
- Ouèssè (Wese) ■
  - Challa-Ogoye
  - Kèmon (Ikemon)
  - Kilibo
  - Toui
- Savalou ■
  - Djaloukou (Ija Oku)
  - Doumè
  - Lèma Ifè
  - Ottola
  - Tchetti (Itcheti)
- Savé (Tchabe) ★
  - Adido
  - Bèssè
  - Boni
  - Kaboua
  - Ofè
  - Okpara (Opara)
  - Sakin ◆

Donga Department

- Bassila ■
  - Aledjo-Koura ■
    - Boutou
    - Kaoute (Kawute)
    - Katoulanga
    - Kpartao (Partago)
  - Bassila
    - Dogue
    - Igbomakoro
    - Kikele
    - Modogui
    - Prekete ◆
    - Aworo
  - Manigri (Manyibiri)
    - Igbere
    - Manigri Oke/Ikanni
    - Odola
    - Wannou
  - Pénéssoulou ●
    - Bodi ◆
- Djougou ●
  - Bougou ■
    - Kpaou
  - Pélébina ■
    - Yarakeou
- Ouake ●
  - Semere I ●
    - Awotebi (Awotobi)
    - Mami

Oueme Department

- Porto-Novo (Ajase)
  - 1st Arrond (Akoro)
  - 2nd Arrond
  - 3rd Arrond
  - 4th Arrond

Plateau Department

- Adja-Ouèrè (Aja Were)
  - Ikpinlè
  - Kpoulou
  - Massè ◆
  - Oko-Akarè
- Ifangni (Ifonyin)
  - Banigbe
  - Daagbé ◆
  - Kokumolu ◆
  - Lagbé
  - Tchaada
- Ketu ★
  - Idigny (Idiyin)
    - Ilara-Kanga
  - Odometa
  - Okpometa
  - Kpankou (Panku) ◆
- Pobè (Ipobe)
  - Ahoyéyé
  - Igana
  - Issaba
  - Towé
- Sakété (Itakete) ★
  - Agidi
  - Ita-Djèbou (Ita Ijebu)
  - Takon (Itakon)
  - Yoko

Zou Department

- Zagnanado (Zañanado) ●
  - Kpedekpo
- Ouinhi ■
  - Dasso ◆

★ − Commune headquarters that are ancient historic capitals of Yoruba kingdoms and are recognized by the constitution of the Republic of Benin as homes of constituent monrchies.[10]
■ − Commune or arrondissement headquarters that are partially Yoruba and have other 'Yoruba-speaking' towns/villages/communities (arrondissements) within their official borders.
◆ − Mixed (Yoruba and another ethnicity) towns/villages/communities a.k.a. or arrondissements that are not commune or arrondissement headquarters.
● − Commune headquarters and arrondissement chief towns that are completely Non-Yoruba but have 'Yoruba-speaking' towns/villages/communities/quarters (arrondissements) within their official borders.

== Language ==
As members of the Yoruba language continuum, the Yoruba spoken in Benin consists of several dialects mutually intelligible both with standard Yoruba spoken in Nigeria as well as with other dialects across the border. Some of these dialects, such as; Ohori, Anago (of Ketu and of Shabe actually straddle the Nigeria-Benin international border, with several towns and villages of the afore mentioned groups falling into either side, some such as Ilara even straddle it.

The language is used in daily communication, media, and religious practices. Variation is present, often influenced by neighboring languages such as Fon (including Gun) and other Gbe and Gur languages.

== Culture and religion ==
Beninese Yoruba retain and maintain traditional Yoruba cultural practices including music, dance, festivals, and oral literature such as; Oríkì, Ifá, Oro and Egungun festivals. Religious life is diverse: many worship the Orishas and practice traditional Yoruba religion, while others are adherents of Christianity and Islam.

The Vodun religion, which shares roots and several deities with Yoruba religion, also influences spiritual practices in the region.

== Contemporary issues ==
Beninese Yoruba participate in national politics, education, commerce and social life. However, there have been concerns regarding political persecution and cultural marginalization. Cultural groups and Yoruba scholars in Benin and Nigeria continue to advocate for the preservation and promotion of Yoruba identity across West Africa.

== See also ==
- Yoruba people
- Languages of Benin
- Porto-Novo
- Ketu (Benin)
- Ife/Ana people
- Idaasha people
- Oyo Empire
- Mokole People
