= Demographics of Benin =

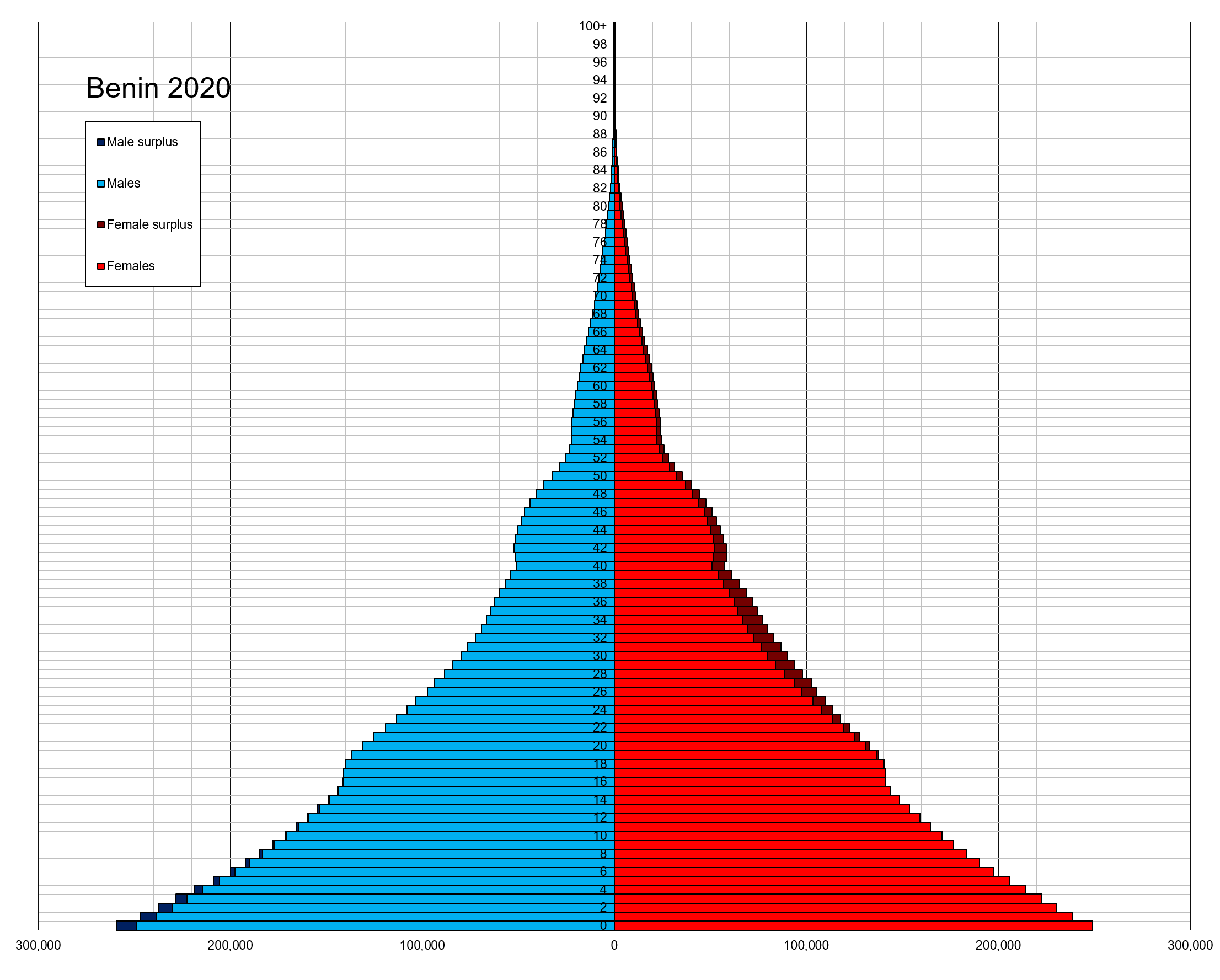
- Population pyramid of Benin in 2020
- Population: 15,170,420 (2026 est.)
- Growth rate: 3.34% (2022 est.)
- Birth rate: 41.15 births/1,000 population (2022 est.)
- Death rate: 8.01 deaths/1,000 population (2022 est.)
- Life expectancy: 62.21 years
  - male: 60.39 years
  - female: 64.14 years
- Fertility rate: 5.43 children born/woman (2022 est.)
- Infant mortality: 55.76 deaths/1,000 live births
- Net migration rate: 0.24 migrant(s)/1,000 population (2022 est.)

Age structure
- 0–14 years: 45.56%
- 65 and over: 2.39%

Sex ratio
- Total: 0.97 male(s)/female (2022 est.)
- At birth: 1.05 male(s)/female
- Under 15: 1.02 male(s)/female
- 65 and over: 0.72 male(s)/female

Nationality
- Nationality: Beninese

Language
- Official: French

The demographics of Benin include population density, ethnicity, education level, health of the populace, economic status, religious affiliations and other aspects of the population.

The majority of Benin's 13.3 million people live in the south. The population is young, with a life expectancy of 62 years.

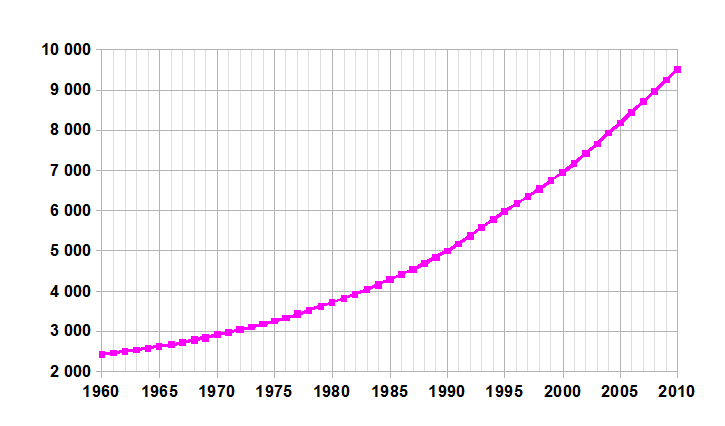
Demographics of Benin. Data from FAO, 2005. Number of inhabitants in thousands.

About 42 African ethnic groups live in this country; these various groups settled in Benin at different times and have also migrated within the country. Ethnic groups include:

- the Yoruba in the southeast (migrated from what is now Nigeria in the 12th century);
- the Dendi in the north-central area (they came from what is now Mali in the 16th century);
- the Bariba and the Fula (or Fulani) (Fula: Fulɓe; French: Peul) in the northeast;
- the Betammaribe and the Somba in the Atacora Range;
- the Fon in the area around Abomey in the South Central; and
- the Mina, Xweda, and Aja (who came from what is now Togo in the 12th century) on the coast.
- the Ewe people on the coast

French is the official language but is spoken more in urban than in rural areas. The literacy rate is 54% among adult males and 31% among adult females as of 2018; these rates are slowly growing. Recent migrations have brought other African nationals to Benin, including Nigerians, Togolese and Malians. The foreign community also includes many Lebanese and Indians involved in trade and commerce. The personnel of the many European embassies, foreign aid missions, nongovernmental organizations and missionary groups account for much of the 5,500 European population.

Several religions are practiced in Benin. Traditional African religions are widespread (50%), and their practices vary from one ethnic group to the other. Arab merchants introduced Islam in the north and among the Yoruba. European missionaries brought Christianity to the south and central areas of Benin. Muslims account for 20% of the population and Christians for 30%. Many nominal Muslims and Christians continue to practice traditional African religion traditions. It is believed that West African Vodun originated in Benin and was introduced to Brazil and the Caribbean Islands by slaves taken from this particular area of the Slave Coast.

== Population ==
Population, fertility rate and net reproduction rate, United Nations estimates

According to the 2022 revision of the World Population Prospects the total population of Benin was 12,996,895 in 2021, compared to only 2,255,000 in 1950. The proportion of children below the age of 15 in 2010 was 43.7%; 53.3% were between 15 and 65 years of age, while 3% were of 65 years or older.

View source data.
View source data.
View source data.
View source data.

	Total population	Population aged 0–14 (%)	Population aged 15–64 (%)	Population aged 65+ (%)
1950	2 255 000	35.2	57	7.8
1955	2 302 000	37.0	56.6	6.3
1960	2 420 000	38.4	56.1	5.5
1965	2 602 000	40.7	54.3	5
1970	2 850 000	42.7	52.7	4.6
1975	3 182 000	44.2	51.4	4.4
1980	3 611 000	45.2	50.7	4.0
1985	4 140 000	45.9	50.4	3.7
1990	4 773 000	46.2	50.4	3.4
1995	5 651 000	45.5	51.3	3.1
2000	6 518 000	45.6	51.4	3.0
2005	7 634 000	44.6	52.4	3.0
2010	8 850 000	43.7	53.3	3.0

Population Estimates by Sex and Age Group (01.VII.2011) (Data refer to national projections.):

Age group	Male	Female	Total	%
Total	4 446 877	4 620 199	9 067 076	100
0–4	828 064	801 448	1 629 512	17.97
5–9	675 912	659 254	1 335 166	14.73
10–14	572 756	564 312	1 137 068	12.54
15–19	553 241	527 958	1 081 199	11.92
20–24	398 920	369 026	767 946	8.47
25–29	291 598	317 891	609 489	6.72
30–34	227 400	310 493	537 893	5.93
35–39	213 385	281 234	494 619	5.46
40–44	175 956	202 155	378 111	4.17
45–49	142 056	166 810	308 866	3.41
50–54	110 074	122 576	232 650	2.57
55–59	82 190	89 780	171 970	1.90
60–64	64 968	70 800	135 768	1.50
65-69	35 915	39 619	75 534	0.83
70-74	36 511	46 229	82 740	0.91
75-79	15 591	20 862	36 453	0.40
80+	22 340	29 752	52 092	0.57
Age group	Male	Female	Total	Percent
0–14	2 076 732	2 025 014	4 101 746	45.24
15–64	2 259 788	2 458 723	4 718 511	52.04
65+	110 357	136 462	246 819	2.72

Population Estimates by Sex and Age Group (01.VII.2019) (Projections based on the 2013 Population Census.):

Age group	Male	Female	Total	%
Total	5 832 926	6 024 701	11 857 627	100
0–4	940 701	900 981	1 841 682	15.53
5–9	849 322	827 010	1 676 332	14.14
10–14	849 093	828 651	1 677 744	14.15
15–19	700 987	665 779	1 366 766	11.53
20–24	539 908	515 230	1 055 138	8.90
25–29	405 041	468 706	873 747	7.37
30–34	333 366	445 579	778 945	6.57
35–39	298 390	364 433	662 823	5.59
40–44	245 129	279 544	524 673	4.42
45–49	204 983	214 033	419 016	3.53
50–54	136 813	139 819	276 632	2.33
55–59	120 528	130 415	250 943	2.12
60–64	65 462	67 250	132 712	1.12
65-69	62 527	72 418	134 945	1.14
70-74	31 651	37 112	68 763	0.58
75-79	24 810	33 122	57 932	0.49
80+	24 217	34 620	58 837	0.50
Age group	Male	Female	Total	Percent
0–14	2 639 116	2 556 642	5 195 758	43.82
15–64	3 050 605	3 290 787	6 341 392	53.48
65+	143 205	177 272	320 477	2.70

== Vital statistics ==
Benin's registration of vital events is incomplete. The Population Department of the United Nations has prepared the following estimates. Population estimates account for under numeration in population censuses.

	Mid-year population	Live births	Deaths	Natural change	CBR (Note: CBR = crude birth rate (per 1000); CDR = crude death rate (per 1000); NC = natural change (per 1000); TFR = total fertility rate (number of children per woman); IMR = infant mortality rate per 1000 births)	CDR	NC	TFR	IMR	Life expectancy (years)
1950	2,264,000	92,000	72,000	21,000	40.6	31.5	9.1	5.75	210.2	34.95
1951	2,281,000	93,000	72,000	21,000	40.8	31.6	9.2	5.78	208.0	35.20
1952	2,298,000	95,000	72,000	22,000	41.1	31.4	9.8	5.83	205.4	35.47
1953	2,317,000	96,000	72,000	24,000	41.5	31.0	10.5	5.88	203.0	35.82
1954	2,337,000	98,000	72,000	26,000	42.0	30.8	11.2	5.94	200.4	36.05
1955	2,360,000	100,000	72,000	28,000	42.4	30.4	12.0	5.99	197.7	36.39
1956	2,385,000	103,000	71,000	31,000	42.9	29.9	13.0	6.05	195.0	36.83
1957	2,413,000	105,000	72,000	34,000	43.5	29.6	13.9	6.11	192.2	37.09
1958	2,443,000	108,000	71,000	36,000	44.0	29.2	14.8	6.17	189.4	37.48
1959	2,476,000	111,000	71,000	39,000	44.6	28.8	15.8	6.23	186.5	37.86
1960	2,512,000	113,000	72,000	42,000	45.1	28.5	16.6	6.28	183.6	38.18
1961	2,551,000	117,000	72,000	46,000	46.0	28.1	17.8	6.40	180.5	38.54
1962	2,593,000	120,000	72,000	48,000	46.3	27.8	18.6	6.46	177.5	38.93
1963	2,638,000	123,000	72,000	51,000	46.7	27.3	19.3	6.51	174.4	39.33
1964	2,686,000	126,000	72,000	54,000	46.9	26.9	20.0	6.57	171.3	39.76
1965	2,736,000	129,000	72,000	56,000	47.0	26.4	20.6	6.61	168.2	40.18
1966	2,789,000	131,000	72,000	59,000	47.0	25.9	21.1	6.64	165.0	40.65
1967	2,844,000	133,000	72,000	61,000	46.8	25.4	21.4	6.65	162.0	41.06
1968	2,901,000	136,000	72,000	64,000	46.8	24.9	21.9	6.68	159.1	41.52
1969	2,961,000	139,000	73,000	66,000	46.7	24.5	22.2	6.71	156.3	41.85
1970	3,023,000	141,000	73,000	68,000	46.7	24.1	22.6	6.74	153.7	42.19
1971	3,088,000	144,000	73,000	71,000	46.7	23.7	23.1	6.79	151.2	42.58
1972	3,156,000	148,000	73,000	75,000	46.7	23.1	23.6	6.82	148.2	43.16
1973	3,227,000	150,000	73,000	77,000	46.5	22.6	23.9	6.83	145.3	43.60
1974	3,301,000	153,000	73,000	80,000	46.4	22.1	24.3	6.84	142.4	44.09
1975	3,379,000	157,000	73,000	84,000	46.4	21.6	24.8	6.85	139.5	44.68
1976	3,460,000	161,000	72,000	88,000	46.3	20.9	25.5	6.86	136.5	45.49
1977	3,546,000	164,000	72,000	92,000	46.3	20.3	26.0	6.85	133.5	46.18
1978	3,637,000	168,000	71,000	96,000	46.1	19.6	26.5	6.84	130.7	46.96
1979	3,732,000	174,000	72,000	102,000	46.5	19.3	27.2	6.91	128.1	47.36
1980	3,834,000	180,000	73,000	108,000	47.0	18.9	28.1	6.99	125.7	47.88
1981	3,942,000	186,000	73,000	113,000	47.3	18.6	28.7	7.05	123.3	48.31
1982	4,054,000	191,000	74,000	117,000	47.2	18.2	28.9	7.05	121.2	48.81
1983	4,172,000	195,000	74,000	121,000	46.8	17.8	29.1	7.03	119.1	49.33
1984	4,293,000	201,000	75,000	126,000	46.8	17.4	29.3	7.02	117.1	49.75
1985	4,420,000	206,000	75,000	131,000	46.6	17.0	29.6	6.99	115.2	50.37
1986	4,551,000	211,000	75,000	137,000	46.4	16.5	30.0	6.95	113.1	51.08
1987	4,689,000	217,000	75,000	142,000	46.3	16.0	30.3	6.90	111.0	51.66
1988	4,832,000	223,000	75,000	147,000	46.0	15.5	30.5	6.85	108.8	52.29
1989	4,980,000	227,000	76,000	151,000	45.5	15.2	30.3	6.80	106.8	52.68
1990	5,133,000	233,000	76,000	157,000	45.4	14.8	30.6	6.73	104.6	53.29
1991	5,293,000	239,000	77,000	162,000	45.1	14.5	30.7	6.67	102.6	53.62
1992	5,458,000	244,000	77,000	167,000	44.7	14.1	30.6	6.60	100.3	54.09
1993	5,706,000	251,000	77,000	174,000	44.6	13.7	30.8	6.51	98.1	54.54
1994	5,923,000	270,000	80,000	190,000	45.3	13.5	31.8	6.41	96.0	54.91
1995	6,047,000	267,000	80,000	187,000	44.0	13.2	30.8	6.31	94.1	55.30
1996	6,204,000	270,000	80,000	190,000	43.5	12.9	30.5	6.26	92.3	55.56
1997	6,387,000	275,000	80,000	195,000	43.0	12.6	30.4	6.20	90.5	55.98
1998	6,584,000	280,000	81,000	199,000	42.6	12.4	30.2	6.10	88.6	56.22
1999	6,789,000	287,000	82,000	204,000	42.2	12.1	30.1	6.00	86.8	56.53
2000	6,998,000	292,000	84,000	208,000	41.7	12.0	29.7	5.89	85.0	56.58
2001	7,212,000	298,000	85,000	213,000	41.4	11.8	29.6	5.82	83.3	56.66
2002	7,432,000	307,000	87,000	219,000	41.3	11.8	29.5	5.78	81.6	56.61
2003	7,659,000	317,000	89,000	228,000	41.4	11.6	29.8	5.77	79.9	56.74
2004	7,895,000	325,000	91,000	234,000	41.2	11.5	29.7	5.72	78.1	56.83
2005	8,149,000	333,000	92,000	241,000	40.9	11.3	29.6	5.68	76.5	57.13
2006	8,403,000	344,000	94,000	250,000	40.9	11.1	29.8	5.64	75.0	57.46
2007	8,648,000	350,000	95,000	255,000	40.4	11.0	29.5	5.56	73.6	57.68
2008	8,906,000	355,000	96,000	259,000	39.9	10.8	29.1	5.48	72.2	57.87
2009	9,173,000	364,000	98,000	265,000	39.6	10.7	28.9	5.44	70.9	57.96
2010	9,446,000	372,000	99,000	273,000	39.3	10.5	28.9	5.39	69.6	58.36
2011	9,726,000	381,000	101,000	280,000	39.2	10.4	28.8	5.37	68.2	58.46
2012	10,014,000	392,000	102,000	289,000	39.1	10.2	28.9	5.35	66.9	58.72
2013	10,309,000	404,000	104,000	299,000	39.1	10.1	29.0	5.35	65.6	58.97
2014	10,615,000	416,000	106,000	310,000	39.2	10.0	29.2	5.35	64.3	59.13
2015	10,933,000	427,000	108,000	319,000	39.0	9.9	29.2	5.32	63.1	59.38
2016	11,260,000	438,000	110,000	329,000	38.9	9.8	29.2	5.30	61.9	59.54
2017	11,597,000	449,000	111,000	337,000	38.7	9.6	29.1	5.27	60.6	59.86
2018	11,941,000	456,000	113,000	343,000	38.2	9.4	28.8	5.20	59.3	60.14
2019	12,290,000	463,000	114,000	349,000	37.7	9.2	28.4	5.13	57.9	60.45
2020	12,898,000	462,000	120,000	342,000	35.3	9.2	26.2	4.80	56.2	60.2
2021	13,242,000	467,000	125,000	341,000	34.8	9.3	25.4	4.71	54.9	59.6
2022	13,585,000	473,000	123,000	350,000	34.4	8.9	25.4	4.63	53.7	60.5
2023	13,934,000	478,000	124,000	354,000	33.9	8.8	25.1	4.56	52.3	60.8

Source: UN DESA, World Population Prospects, 2022

=== Fertility ===
Total Fertility Rate (TFR) (Wanted Fertility Rate) and Crude Birth Rate (CBR):

Year	CBR (Total)	TFR (Total)	CBR (Urban)	TFR (Urban)	CBR (Rural)	TFR (Rural)
1996	42.2	6.32 (5.0)	37.8	5.24 (4.0)	44.8	7.02 (5.6)
2001	41.1	5.6 (4.6)	36.0	4.4 (3.6)	43.8	6.4 (53)
2006	41.5	5.7 (4.8)	38.7	4.9 (4.1)	43.0	6.3 (5.3)
2011–12	33.3	4.9 (4.0)	33.1	4.3 (3.6)	33.3	5.4 (4.4)
2017–18	40.5	5.7 (4.9)	39.1	5.2 (4.5)	41.6	6.1 (5.2)

Fertility data as of 2011-2012 (DHS Program):

Department	Total fertility rate	Percentage of women age 15-49 currently pregnant	Mean number of children ever born to women age 40-49
Alibori	5.8	15.0	6.4
Atacora	5.8	9.1	6.0
Atlantique	5.1	9.2	4.8
Borgou	5.2	9.3	5.2
Collines	4.7	8.1	5.8
Couffo	5.1	11.7	6.0
Donga	4.7	11.0	6.0
Littoral	3.6	6.3	3.4
Mono	4.6	10.8	4.7
Ouémé	5.2	10.0	5.1
Plateau	5.3	7.3	4.9
Zou	5.0	10.2	5.1

==== Before 1950 ====
Years	1925	1926	1927	1928	1929	1930	1931	1932	1933	1934
Total Fertility Rate in Benin	5.66	5.66	5.67	5.67	5.67	5.68	5.68	5.69	5.69	5.69

Years	1935	1936	1937	1938	1939	1940	1941	1942	1943	1944
Total Fertility Rate in Benin	5.70	5.70	5.70	5.71	5.71	5.71	5.72	5.72	5.73	5.73

Years	1945	1946	1947	1948	1949
Total Fertility Rate in Benin	5.73	5.74	5.74	5.74	5.75

=== Life expectancy ===
Period	Life expectancy in years
1950–1955	33.72
1955–1960	▲36.13
1960–1965	▲38.42
1965–1970	▲40.87
1970–1975	▲43.48
1975–1980	▲46.22
1980–1985	▲48.30
1985–1990	▲51.92
1990–1995	▲55.14
1995–2000	▼54.96
2000–2005	▲56.18
2005–2010	▲58.56
2010–2015	▲59.93

== Ethnic groups ==
There are several dozen ethnolinguistic groups in Benin, representing three of Africa's language families: Niger–Congo, Nilo-Saharan, and Afroasiatic. The latter is represented by Hausa, living mostly as merchants in the north, while Nilo-Saharan is represented by the Dɛndi people, descending from the Songhai Empire. The Songhay language Dɛndi predominates along the Niger River in the far north, and is used as a lingua franca in Muslim areas throughout the north, in Alibori, Borgou, and Donga provinces. Of the Niger–Congo family, five branches are represented:

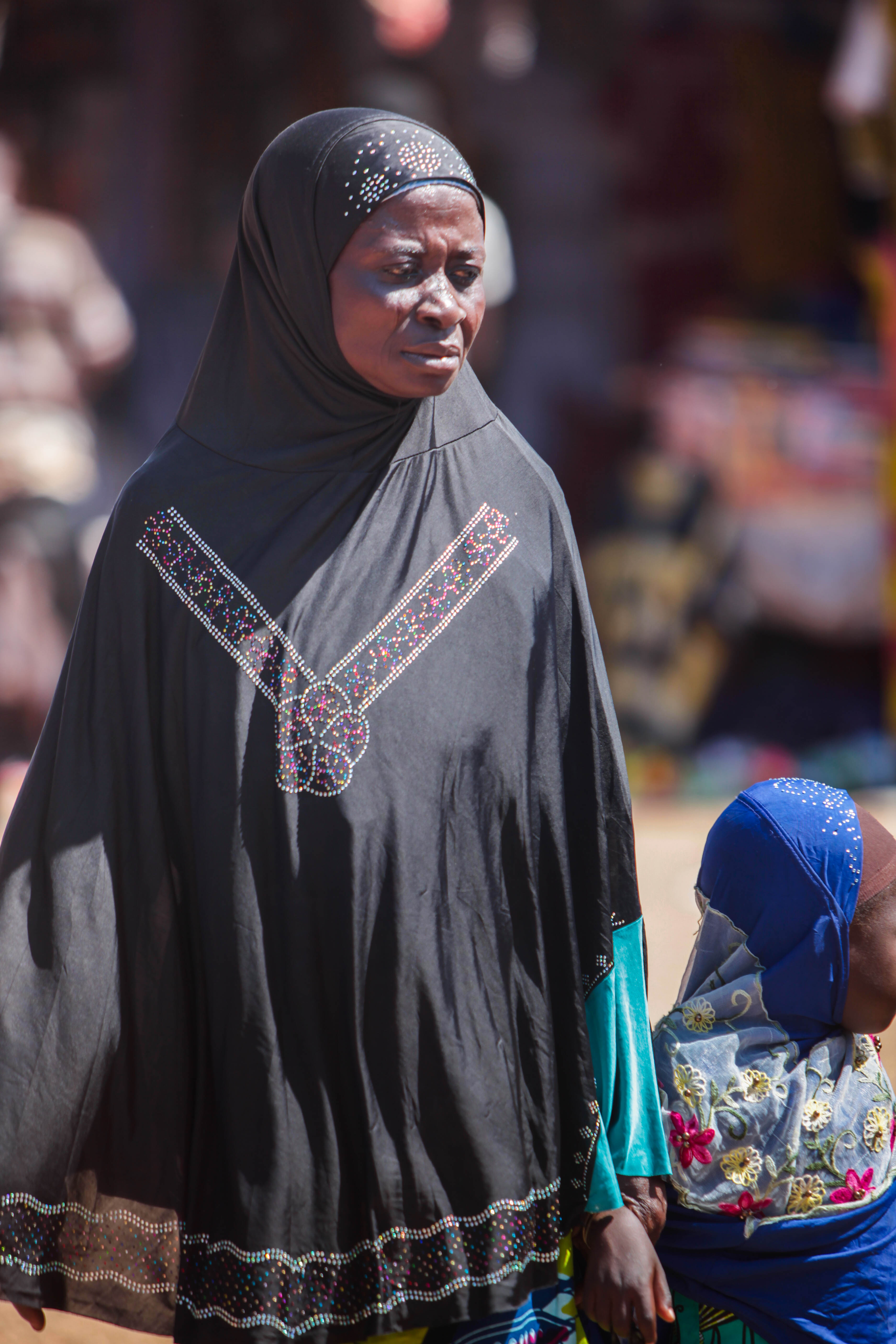
Fula woman in Benin.

- Mande by the Boko or Busa, now in the far eastern corner (southern Alibori-northern Borgou), but previously more widely spread before being largely absorbed by the Bariba
- Senegambian by the nomadic Fulani scattered across the northeast
- Benue–Congo by the Yoruba such as those of the old kingdom of Sakete, and the capital city of Porto-Novo, having expanded west from the Yoruba cities of Oyo and Ife in the 12th to 19th centuries
- Gur (Voltaic) languages predominate in the four northern provinces, with the Batɔmbu (Bariba) of the old Borgou (Bariba) Kingdom occupying most of the countryside in its successor provinces of Borgou and Alibori, as well as the provincial capital of Parakou; the Yom throughout much of Donga province and its capital Djougou; and several groups in the Atakora, including the Bɛtamaribɛ of the Otammari country around the provincial capital of Natitingou, the Biali, the Waama of Tanguiéta, and the Gulmàceba.
- Kwa, especially the Gbe languages spoken by the Tado peoples in the southern and central provinces: the Aja who established themselves in Kouffo province from neighboring Togo and gave rise to the other Tado peoples of Benin, except for the Mina of Mono province, who arrived separately from Togo or Ghana: The Fɔn culture centered in Zou province around the old Fɔn capital of Abomey, but also dominant in Cotonou and southern Atlantique areas such as Ouidah; the Maxi in central Collines, especially around Savalou; the Ayizɔ of central Atlantique (Allada); the Xwla and Xueda in the lagoons of the coast; the Tɔfin of Ouémé; and the Gun. Other Kwa languages are spoken by the Anii in southern Donga in the region of Bassila, and the Fooɖo in western Donga near the town of Ouaké.

The largest ethnic group are the Fon, with 1.7 million speakers of the Fon language (2001), followed by the various Yoruba groups (1.2 million), the Aja (600,000), the Bariba (460,000), the Ayizo (330,000), the Fulani (310,000), and the Gun (240,000). Near the ports in the south can be found many people who are descended from returned Brazilian slaves.

== Languages ==
Over 50 languages are spoken in Benin. The official language is French. Of the many indigenous African languages, Fon and Yoruba are the most important in southern Benin. In the north there are at least six major languages, including Baatonum and Fulani.

== Religion ==
Religion in Benin (ARDA 2020 est.)
1. Catholic (23.5%)
2. Protestant (8.01%)
3. Other Christian (12.4%)
4. Islam (29.1%)
5. Ethnic Religion (26.6%)
6. Irreligion (0.23%)
7. Other (0.16%)

Islam 27.7%, Roman Catholic 25.5%, Protestant 13.5% (Celestial 6.7%, Methodist 3.4%, other Protestant 3.4%), Vodoun 11.6%, other Christian 9.5%, other traditional religions 2.6%, Other 2.6%, None 5.8%, (2013 est.)
Pew Forum estimated that, in 2010, that Roman Catholics constituted 30% of the country, Protestants 23.2%, and other Christians 0.3%, with all Christians making up 53.4% of the population.

== See also ==
- 1992 Benin census
