= Illoulofin Solar Power Station =

Solar farm in Plateau, Benin

- Country: Benin
- Location: Pobè, Plateau Department
- Coordinates: 06°57′59″N 02°39′07″E
- Status: Operational
- Construction began: August 2021
- Commission date: July 2022
- Construction cost: US$72 million (€60.5 million) (first phase)
- Owner: Government of Benin
- Operator: Eiffage Énergie Systèmes

Solar farm
- Type: Flat-panel PV
- Site area: 96 hectares (240 acres)

Power generation
- Nameplate capacity: 50 megawatts (67,000 hp)
- Annual net output: 70GWh

Illoulofin Solar Power Station, is a 50 megawatts (67,000 hp) solar power plant in Benin, whose first 25 MW was commissioned on 19 July 2022, and the next 25 MW is under construction and is expected to come online in 2025.

The solar farm is under development by the Government of Benin, with funding from the European Union (EU), the French Development Agency (AFD) and the Beninese Electricity Company (SBEE). The power station will be built in phases, with the first phase of 25 megawatts capacity followed by the second phase of equal magnitude. The energy from this solar plant will be integrated into the Beninese national electricity grid, during the 25 years of the solar farm's expected lifespan.

== Location ==
The power station is located in the town of Pobè, in Plateau Department, in southeastern Benin, close to the international border with Nigeria. Pobè is located approximately 34 kilometres (21 mi), by road, north of Sakété, the capital of Plateau Department. This is approximately 103 kilometres (64 mi), northeast of Cotonou, the financial and business capital of Benin. The power station, whose construction began during the third quarter of 2021, sits on a piece of land measuring 96 hectares (240 acres), provided by SBEE.

== Overview ==
The first phase of this power station, comprises 47,212 crystalline PV panels, each rated at 530 Watts, for a generation capacity of 25.02 megawatts. The energy generated here is evacuated via a 20kV medium-voltage transmission line measuring 2.5 kilometres (2 mi) in length, to a location where it enters the national electricity grid of Benin.

In December 2021, the Beninese Minister of Energy announced that the design and size of the solar farm had been increased from the original 25MW to a new capacity of 50MW.

== Developers ==
The Beninese government selected the French engineering and construction conglomerate Eiffage to design, construct, operate, maintain the solar farm for the first three years of commercial operation, then transfer it to SBEE. Eiffage in turn, tasked two of its subsidiaries, Eiffage Énergie Systèmes and RMT to carry out the task. During the first three years of commercial operations, Eiffage engineers will train SBEE engineers and technicians on the solar farm operations and maintenance.

== Construction timeline, costs and funding ==
The engineering, procurement and construction (EPC) contractor is a consortium comprising Eiffage Energy Systems and RMT, both of whom are subsidiaries of the Eiffage Group. The first phase of the power station cost US$72 million. It is expected that with the doubling of capacity during the second phase, the cost will increase.

During the first phase, the power station has benefitted from loans provided by the European Union and the French Development Agency. Construction of the first phase started during the second half of 2021 and was expected to conclude in April 2022. Commercial commissioning of the first phase was achieved in July 2022.

In August 2023, Toyota Tsusho of Japan signed a public-private partnership (PPP) agreement with Société béninoise de production d'électricité (SBPE) (English: Beninese Electricity Production Company), to develop the second phase of Illoulofin Solar Power Station. Toyota Tsusho will work with RMT, a German subsidiary of the Eiffage Group to execute the task. The second phase is expected to bring another 25 megawatts online in 2024, bring capacity generation to 50 MW.

== See also ==
- List of power stations in Benin
