= Ifè people (Togo) =

Ethnic group in West Africa

Ifẹ̀
Àná
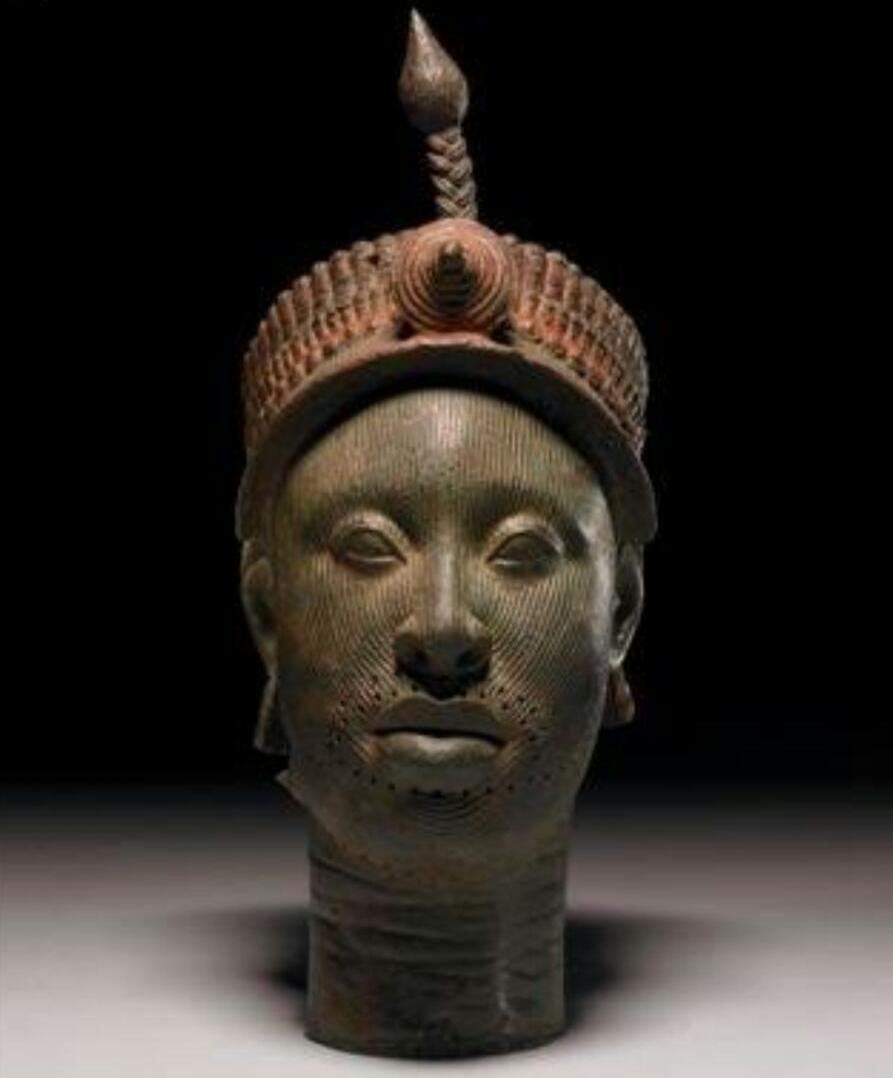
- Brass head cast of an Ooni of Ife

Total population
- 452,000

Regions with significant populations
- Benin: 111,130 (2013)
- Ghana: 45,000
- Togo: 240,000 (2013)

Languages
- Ede Ife and Ede Yoruba; Ewe; French

Religion
- Predominantly Christianity; Minor: Yoruba religion, Islam

Related ethnic groups
- Other Yoruba people Akposo, Ewe, Mahi

The Ifè people also known as the Ana, Atakpame or Baate people, are an ethnic group of Benin and Togo. In Togo, the Ifè are indigenously concentrated around Atakpame, primarily in the Gnagna (Ñaña) and Djama (Jama) quarters, and on the vertical land strip between the towns of Glei and Sokode on the west and the Togo-Benin international border in the east. In Benin, they are found domiciled in the area between the aforementioned border and the town of Savalou.

Ethnologists identify the Ifè (Ana) as the most western of the Yoruba subgroups. In fact, the Ana trace their origins to Ife, and their language is also called Ifè, which has more than 400,000 speakers.

== Geography ==
=== In Togo ===
In Togo, the Ife or Ana people can be found domiciled in the eastern half of the Plateaux Region mostly east of the N1 National highway that runs vertically through the spine of the country, specifically in the prefectures of;

- Est-Mono: Gbadjahe, Elavagnon, Nyamassila, Kamina, Kpessi, Badin-kope, Moretan-Igberioko.
- Anie: Adogbenou (Okeloukoutou), Pallakoko, Anié, Kolo-kope, Glitto, Atchinedji.
- Ogou: Atakpamé, Woudou, Djama, Gnagna, Datcha, Akpare, Ountivou, Glei, Katore.

There is also a smaller Ana-Ife community in the immediate environment of Esse-Ana community in the Yoto Prefecture. The biggest settlements of the Ife people are; Atakpame, Elavagnon, Kamina, Datcha (Dadja), Adogbenou, and Moretan (Morita).

The Yoruboid dialect spoken in the Cantons of Goubi and Kaboli in the Tchamba Prefecture of the Central Region, although sometimes erroneously considered to be one and same with Ife, is simply another Yoruba linguistic community of the Manigri-Kambole variety located to the north of the Ifes with which it shares 87-91% lexical similarity.

=== In Benin ===
In Benin, the Ife (Ana) communities can be found domiciled mostly in the commune of Savalou in the west of the Collines Department. They inhabit the Arrondissements of; Doumè, Tchetti, Ottola, Lema, Djaloukou and partially within Savalou township itself.

It is also spoken in some villages in the communes of Bante and Djidja (in the Agouna arrondissement). These towns and villages are bordered by the Isha-Yoruba communities of the Bantè commune to the north and the Mahi ethnic community to the east.

These are all within the Collines Department of south-central Benin.

== Language ==
The Ife (Ana) people speak the Ife language or Ede Ife. In Togo, there are three major varieties based on the towns of Atakpame (Djama variant), the Dassa variant is spoken in Dadja town, and a third one is based in Kamina. In Benin, the language is based on the dialect of Tchetti. Like all the other dialects of Yoruba, Ife has three tones; (High, Mid and Low). Many speakers of Ife are bilingual in Ewe in the south of Togo and Standardized Yoruba (SY) in the North.

On the converse, Ede Ife is in turn used as a second language (L2) by speakers of; Bago-Kusuntu and Kpessi in Togo, those of Anii in Benin, as well as the Northern Nago and Aguna speakers in both countries.

=== Media ===
The Ife language enjoys vigorous use as first language among all members of its ethnic community and geographic region. It is used on the local radio based in Tchetti, [Radio FM Ore Ọ̀fẹ́] 102.1 Mhz, disseminating news to the surrounding region.
