= List of departments of Benin by Human Development Index =

This is a list of the 12 departments of Benin by Human Development Index as of 2025 with data for the year 2023.

Rank	Department	HDI (2023)
Medium human development
1	Atlantique with Littoral (Cotonou)	0.573
Low human development
2	Oueme with Plateau	0.533
3	Zou with Collines	0.518
-	Benin	0.515
4	Mono with Kouffo	0.499
5	Atakora with Donga	0.469
6	Borgou with Alibori	0.455

== See also ==
- List of countries by Human Development Index
