= Djègbè =

Djègbè may refer to several places in Benin:

- Djègbè, Collines
- Djègbè, Zou
