= Challa-Ogoi =

Coordinates: 8.4497°N 2.4737°E

- Arrondissement
- Interactive map of Challa-Ogoi
- Country: Benin
- Department: Collines Department
- Commune: Ouèssè

Population (2002)
  - Total: 8,659
- Time zone: UTC+1 (WAT)

Challa-Ogoi is an arrondissement in the Collines department of Benin. It is an administrative division under the jurisdiction of the commune of Ouèssè. According to the population census conducted by the Institut National de la Statistique Benin on February 15, 2002, the arrondissement had a total population of 8,659.
