= Aguidi =

Coordinates: 6.7550°N 2.6729°E

- Arrondissement
- Interactive map of Aguidi
- Country: Benin
- Department: Plateau Department
- Commune: Sakété

Population (2002)
  - Total: 12,739
- Time zone: UTC+1 (WAT)

Aguidi is an arrondissement in the Plateau department of Benin. It is an administrative division under the jurisdiction of the commune of Sakété. According to the population census conducted by the Institut National de la Statistique Benin on February 15, 2002, the arrondissement had a total population of 12,739.
