= Zaffé =

Coordinates: 8.1684°N 2.2320°E

- Arrondissement
- Interactive map of Zaffé
- Country: Benin
- Department: Collines Department
- Commune: Glazoué

Population (2002)
  - Total: 9,268
- Time zone: UTC+1 (WAT)

Zaffé is an arrondissement in the Collines department of Benin. It is an administrative division under the jurisdiction of the commune of Glazoué. According to the population census conducted by the Institut National de la Statistique Benin on February 15, 2002, the arrondissement had a total population of 9,268.
