= IFE =

IFE or Ife may refer to:

- Ifẹ, an ancient city and subgroup of the Yoruba people domiciled in south-western Nigeria
- Ifẹ people, a West African ethnic group of Togo, Benin and Ghana, connected in language and origin to the other Yoruba people
- Ifè language, a Niger–Congo language spoken by some 180,000 people in Togo and Benin
- Ìfẹ́, a Nigerian LGBT romantic film
- "Ife", a composition from Miles Davis' 1974 compilation album Big Fun
- In-flight entertainment, the entertainment available to aircraft passengers during a flight
- Ife Ibrahim (born 2008), Nigerian footballer

== Organizations ==
- Institute for Energy Technology
- Institution of Fire Engineers, a worldwide body that provides research, training, conferences and professional qualifications for firefighters
- Instituto Nacional Electoral, an autonomous, public organization responsible for organizing federal elections in Mexico
- Islamic Forum of Europe, an Islamic organisation based in the United Kingdom with affiliates in Europe
- State Railways Institution (Instituto de Ferrocarriles del Estado), a state-run organization of Venezuela that manages the railway systems of the country
- University of Finance and Economics (Mongolia) (previously Institute of Finance and Economics), one of the largest educational institutions of Mongolia
