= Issaba =

Coordinates: 7°05′N 2°37′E

- Arrondissement
- Interactive map of Issaba
- Country: Benin
- Department: Plateau Department
- Commune: Pobè

Population (2002)
  - Total: 19,732
- Time zone: UTC+1 (WAT)

Issaba is an arrondissement in the Plateau department of Benin. It is an administrative division under the jurisdiction of the commune of Pobè. According to the population census conducted by the Institut National de la Statistique Benin on 15 February 2002, the arrondissement had a total population of 19,732.
