= Adido =

Coordinates: 8°45′N 2°36′E

- Arrondissement
- Interactive map of Adido
- Country: Benin
- Department: Collines Department
- Commune: Savé

Population (2002)
  - Total: 8,183
- Time zone: UTC+1 (WAT)

Adido is an arrondissement in the Collines department of Benin. It is an administrative division under the jurisdiction of the commune of Savé. According to the population census conducted by the Institut National de la Statistique Benin on February 15, 2002, the arrondissement had a total population of 8,183.
