= Daagbé =

Coordinates: 6°34′N 2°41′E

- Arrondissement
- Interactive map of Daagbé
- Country: Benin
- Department: Plateau Department
- Commune: Ifangni

Population (2002)
  - Total: 9,498
- Time zone: UTC+1 (WAT)

Daagbé is an arrondissement in the Plateau department of Benin. It is an administrative division under the jurisdiction of the commune of Ifangni. According to the population census conducted by the Institut National de la Statistique Benin on February 15, 2002, the arrondissement had a total population of 9,498.
