= Massè =

Coordinates: 7°09′28″N 2°32′37″E

- Arrondissement
- Interactive map of Massè
- Country: Benin
- Department: Plateau Department
- Commune: Adja-Ouèrè

Population (2002)
  - Total: 16,902
- Time zone: UTC+1 (WAT)

Massè is an arrondissement in the Plateau department of Benin. It is an administrative division under the jurisdiction of the commune of Adja-Ouèrè. According to the population census conducted by the Institut National de la Statistique Benin on February 15, 2002, the arrondissement had a total population of 16,902.
