= Idigny =

Coordinates: 7°29′N 2°42′E

- Arrondissement
- Interactive map of Idigny
- Country: Benin
- Department: Plateau Department
- Commune: Kétou

Population (2002)
  - Total: 26,882
- Time zone: UTC+1 (WAT)

Idigny is an arrondissement in the Plateau department of Benin. It is an administrative division under the jurisdiction of the commune of Kétou. According to the population census conducted by the Institut National de la Statistique Benin on February 15, 2002, the arrondissement had a total population of 26,882.
