= Tré =

Tré may refer to:

- Tré Cool, drummer for the American band Green Day
- ¡Tré!, the eleventh studio album by the same band.
- Tré, Benin, a town and arrondissement in the Collines department of Benin
- A fermented pork product found in Central Vietnam (see nem chua)
