= Doumè =

Coordinates: 8°01′N 1°38′E

- Arrondissement
- Interactive map of Doumè
- Country: Benin
- Department: Collines Department
- Commune: Savalou

Population (2002)
  - Total: 13,592
- Time zone: UTC+1 (WAT)

Doumè is an arrondissement in the Collines department of Benin. It is an administrative division under the jurisdiction of the commune of Savalou. According to the population census conducted by the Institut National de la Statistique Benin on February 15, 2002, the arrondissement had a total population of 13,592.
