= Tré, Benin =

Coordinates: 7.6937°N 2.2673°E

Tré
- Arrondissement and town
- Interactive map of Tré
- Country: Benin
- Department: Collines Department
- Commune: Dassa-Zoumé

Population (2002)
  - Total: 4,903
- Time zone: UTC+1 (WAT)

Tré is a town and arrondissement in the Collines department of Benin. It is an administrative division under the jurisdiction of the commune of Dassa-Zoumé. According to the population census conducted by the Institut National de la Statistique Benin on February 15, 2002, the arrondissement had a total population of 4,903.
