= Maria Gleta Power Plant =

Power plant in Godomey, Atlantique, Benin

- Country: Benin
- Location: Godomey, Atlantique Department
- Coordinates: 6°25′34.3″N 2°18′23.5″E
- Status: Operational
- Construction began: 2017
- Commission date: 2019

Thermal power station
- Primary fuel: Natural gas

Power generation
- Units operational: 7
- Nameplate capacity: 127 MW

The Maria Gleta Power Plant is a gas-fired power plant in Godomey, Atlantique Department, Benin.

== History ==
The power plant was inaugurated on 29 August 2019 after two years of construction works.

== Technical specifications ==
The power plant has an installed capacity of 127 MW. It consists of seven generators.

== See also ==
- Energy in Benin
- List of power stations in Benin
