= 1992 Benin census =

Deuxième Recensement Général de la Population et de l'Habitation
← 1978	2002 →

General information
- Country: Benin
- Authority: Institut national de la statistique et de l'analyse économique

Results
- Total population: 4,915,555
- Most populous department: Atlantique (1,066,373)
- Least populous department: Atakora (649,308)

The 1992 Benin Census was conducted in February 1992 and was the second census conducted in Benin. Population data was collected and categorized according to ethnic group and commune. The census was conducted by 4,800 census takers who underwent between 2–4 weeks of training. The census consisted of 52 questions that were asked in French and translated as necessary.

The 1992 Benin Census was one of a few done by a developing country up to this point to collect data that could be used to calculate maternal mortality. (Note: The other countries being Iran, Laos, Madagascar, and Zimbabwe.)

== Accuracy ==
A 2001 report by the MEASURE evaluation uses the Brass Growth Balance Method and Brass PF Ratio Method to evaluate the accuracy of the census. The report found that the census undercounted births, significantly undercounted overall deaths, and that the actual population growth may have been undercounted. The Growth Balance Method calculated that recorded overall deaths were a third of the actual amount, and that recorded female deaths were between 1/2 and 1/3 of the actual amount.
