= List of power stations in Benin =

This article lists all power stations in Benin.

== Hydroelectric ==
Hydroelectric station	Community	Coordinates	Type	Capacity	Year completed	Name of reservoir	River

== Thermal ==
Thermal power station	Community	Coordinates	Fuel type	Capacity	Year completed	Name of owner	Notes
Maria Gleta Power Plant	Maria Gleta, Cotonou		Natural gas	80 MW	2010	Combustion Associates, Inc. (CAI) of California	Operational

== Solar ==
Solar power station	Community	Coordinates	Fuel type	Capacity	Year completed	Name of owner	Notes
Defissol solar project	Pobé		Solar	25MW	N/A		

== See also ==
- List of power stations in Africa
- List of largest power stations in the world
- Energy in Benin
