= Lucie Ablawa Sessinou =

Benin politician

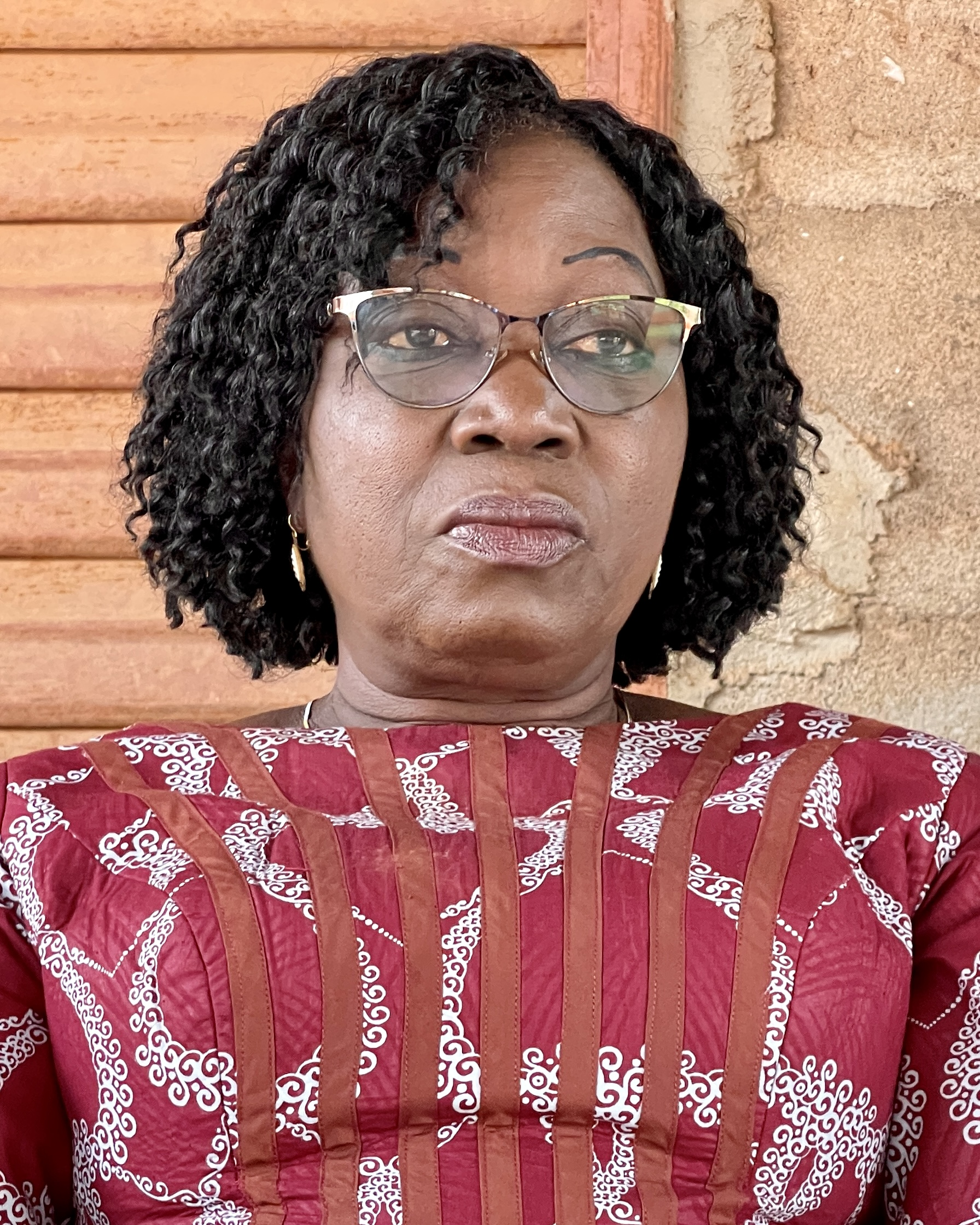
- Lucie Ablawa Sessinou

Mayor of Kétou
- Incumbent
- Assumed office June 6, 2020
- Preceded by: Théophile Dessa

Personal details
- Party: Progressive Union
- Profession: Teacher

Lucie Ablawa Sessinou is a Beninese politician and the mayor of Kétou. She was elected on the ticket of the Beninese political party Progressive Union in the municipal elections of 2020. In July 2018, she became the president of the network of elected female councilors in Benin.

== Biography ==
Lucie Ablawa Sessinou became the first mayor of Kétou in 2003 during the first decentralization mandate in Benin following the municipal elections of 2002. She lost the position in 2008 during the municipal elections of 2008.

A former teacher turned entrepreneur, Lucie Ablawa Sessinou advocates for the involvement of Beninese women in the management of urban affairs and national governance. She co-founded the network of elected female councilors in Benin and served as its president as of July 2018.

Re-elected as mayor of Kétou in the municipal elections of 2020, she was inaugurated into office on Saturday, June 6, 2020, in a ceremony presided over by the Prefect of the Plateau Department, Daniel Valère Setonnougbo.

== See also ==
- Aurélie Adam Soulé
- Claudine Prudencio
- Geneviève Boko Nadjo
- Véronique Brun Hachémè
- Zinatou Saka Osseni Alazi
