= Ohori people =

Ọhọri
Total population
- ~200,000; 124,829 in Benin (2013)

Regions with significant populations
- Benin: Plateau Department (20%) · Zou Department (Ouinhi, Zogbodomè); Nigeria: Ogun State - Ipokia · Yewa North · Imeko Afon LGAs

Religion
- Yoruba religion · Christianity

The Ohori (sometimes called Ije) or Ọ̀họ̀rí-Ìjè are a subgroup of the Yoruba people of West Africa. The local domain of the Ohori is South-eastern Benin north of Pobè (Pọ̀bẹ́ / Ìpọ̀bẹ́) town expanding westwards to and west of the Ouémé River. Often, Ohoris, together with groups of Ifonyins, Aworis and Ketus are known collectively as 'Nagos" in Benin.

== Geography ==
Ohori areas are bound by various Yoruba subgroups to the North, East and South. Egbados (Yewas) are to be found towards the East, the Ifonyins bound them to the South, while to their Northern boundary are the Ketus. They are bounded by the Gbe speaking Fon/Mahi group towards the West.

== History ==
The Ohori natural environment is a naturally swampy/marshy waterlogged depression (Kumi swamp) with what could be described as adverse physical conditions, therefore the area had historically been a safe haven for people fleeing persecution from the larger entities of Ketu, Oyo and others. Because of their relative inaccessibility during the rainy season, the Ohori were considered by their neighbours to be among the most conservative Yoruba, and their speech is quite distinct. By the 19th century, Ohori area fell under an area of French colonial ambitions. Unfavorable policies by the French led to an Ohori uprising. By 1914, there was a full-scale rebellion against French rule. The rebellion was brutally crushed and Ohori-Ije the main town was totally destroyed. After that, a large population of Ohori began mass migrations to the British-ruled Nigeria to the east. By their own classifications the Ohoris can be subdivided into two groups: The Ohori-Ije who live in the great samps between Ipobe and Ketu, and the Ohori-Ketu who can be destribed as the 'drylanders'

== Dialect ==
The local Ohori speech is known as Ede Ije which is mutually intelligible to speakers of other dialectal forms of Yoruba. According to Ethnologue, Ede Ije has a 91% lexical similarity with Ede Nago, and an 85% similarity with spoken Yoruba of Porto-Novo. Although even more dialectal levelling is taking place among the Ohori with increasing social and geographical mobility, as they become more exposed to more popular forms of Yoruba, as well as through increasing Education and Media exposure.
