= Ōhori =

Ōhori, Ohori or Oohori (written: 大堀 lit. "big canal") is a Japanese surname. Notable people with the surname include:

- Aya Ohori (大堀 彩; born 1996), Japanese badminton player
- Kouichi Oohori (大堀 こういち; born 1963), Japanese actor
- Megumi Ohori (大堀 恵; born 1983), Japanese singer and television personality
- Takashi Ohori (大堀 孝; born 1969), Japanese bobsledder

== Etymology ==
"Ōhori" originally meant a large moat. It is derived from Kuroda Nagamasa, a lord of Fukuoka, who reclaimed the northern half of Kusage, an inlet facing Hakata Bay. He then made a moat for the Fukuoka castle.

== See also ==
- Ōhori Park, a park in Chūō-ku, Fukuoka Prefecture, Japan
- Ōhori Station, a railway station in Mogami, Yamagata Prefecture, Japan
