= Ifè language =

Niger–Congo language spoken in Togo and Benin

Ifẹ̀
- Native to: Togo, Benin
- Native speakers: 271,000
- Language family: Niger–Congo?: Atlantic–Congo; Volta–Niger; yeai; Yoruboid; Edekiri; Ede; Ifẹ̀
- Dialects: Tschetti; Djama; Datcha; Kiliji
- Writing system: Latin

Official status
- Recognised minority language in: Benin

Language codes
- ISO 639-3: ife
- Glottolog: ifee1241

Ifẹ̀ (or Ifɛ) is a Yoruboid language spoken by some 271,000 ethnic Ana-Ife people in Togo, Benin and Ghana. It is also known as Ana, Ana-Ifé, Anago, Baate and Ede Ife. It has a lexical similarity of 87%–91% with Ede Nago.

In Togo, there are three major varieties based on the towns of Atakpame (Djama variant), the Dassa variant is spoken in Dadja town, and a third one is based in Kamina. In Benin, the language is based on the dialect of Tchetti. Like all the other dialects of Yoruba, Ife has three tones; (High, Mid and Low). Many speakers of Ife are bilingual in Ewe in the south of Togo and Standardized Yoruba (SY) in the North.

On the converse, Ede Ife is in turn used as a second language (L2) by speakers of; Bago-Kusuntu and Kpessi in Togo, those of Anii in Benin, as well as the Northern Nago and Aguna speakers in both countries.

The Yoruboid dialect spoken in the Cantons of Goubi and Kaboli in the Tchamba Prefecture of the Central Region, although sometimes erroneously considered to be one and same with Ife, is simply another Yoruba linguistic community of the Manigri-Kambole variety located to the north of the Ifes with which it shares 87-91% lexical similarity.

== Media ==
The Ife language enjoys vigorous use as first language among all members of its ethnic community and geographic region. It is used on the local radio based in Tchetti, [Radio FM Ore Ọ̀fẹ́] 102.1 Mhz, disseminating news to the surrounding region.

Written works began to be produced in the language in the 1980s, published by the Comité Provisoire de Langue Ifɛ̀ and SIL. An Ifè–French dictionary (Oŋù-afɔ ŋa nfɛ̀ òŋu òkpi-ŋà ŋa nfãrãsé), edited by Mary Gardner and Elizabeth Graveling, was produced in 2000.
