= Kétou =

- Commune and city
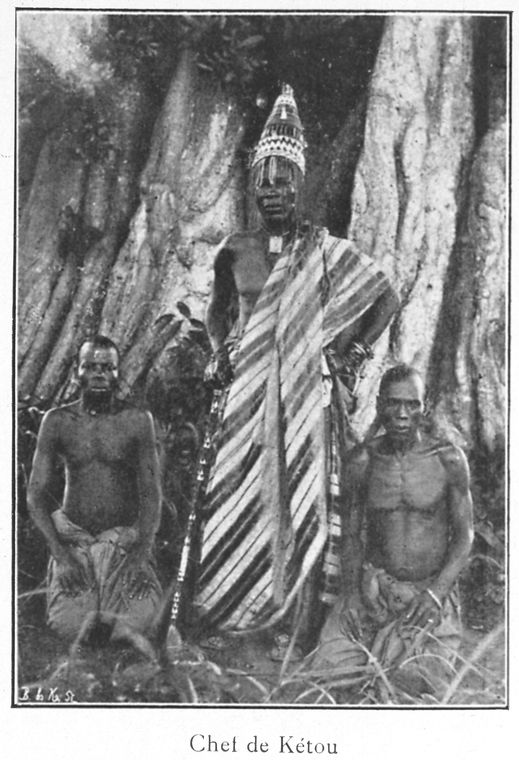
- Chief of Kétou (1900)

- Location in Benin
- Coordinates: 7°21′29″N 2°36′27″E
- Country: Benin
- Department: Plateau Department

Government
  - Mayor: Lucie Ablawa Sessinou, Progressive Union

Area
  - Total: 843 sq mi (2,183 km^{2})

Population (2013)
  - Total: 156,497 (2,013)
- Time zone: UTC+1 (WAT)

Kétou [ke.tu] is a Yoruba town, arrondissement, and commune located in the Plateau Department of the Republic of Benin (previously called Dahomey). The commune covers an area of 2183 square kilometres and as of 2013 had a population of 156,497 people, making it the 13th largest settlement in Benin.

The current mayor is Lucie Ablawa Sessinou of the Progressive Union.

== History ==
Kétou (Ketu) is said to have been founded by Ede, son of Sopasan and grandson of Oduduwa (also known as Odùduwà or Oòduà), who ruled the Yoruba kingdom of Ilé-Ifẹ̀ (also known as Ife) in present-day Nigeria. The oba (meaning 'king' or 'ruler' in the Yoruba language) is referred to as the Alákétu of Kétu.

Most Gbe speaking people (Ewe, Adja, Fon, and speakers of Phla-Phera languages) trace their origins to Ketou. According to their oral history, Ketou was originally known as Ketume (in the sand). Alternatively, they also refer to Ketou as Amedzorfe (place of human origin). They were displaced by the Yoruba because the Yoruba had larger population and access to horses / cavalry from the north. Ketu North and Ketu South administrative districts in the Volta region of Ghana are named in remembrance of these peoples' origins from Ketou in Benin. The indigenes of these two districts are mainly Ewes. Ketou was conquered by Dahomey in 1886, and restored by the French Protectorate in 1893.

== See also ==
- Beninois Yoruba
