= Adja-Ouèrè =

- Commune and city
- Location in Benin
- Coordinates: 7°0′N 2°37′E
- Country: Benin
- Department: Plateau Department

Area
  - Total: 210 sq mi (550 km^{2})

Population (2013)
  - Total: 115,953
- Time zone: UTC+1 (WAT)

Adja-Ouèrè [a.dʒa.wɛ.ʁɛ] is a town, arrondissement, and commune in the Plateau Department of south-eastern Benin. The commune covers an area of 550 square kilometres and as of 2013 had a population of 115,953 people.

== Notable people ==
- Sefou Fagbohoun, businessman and politician
