= Savalou =

- Commune and city
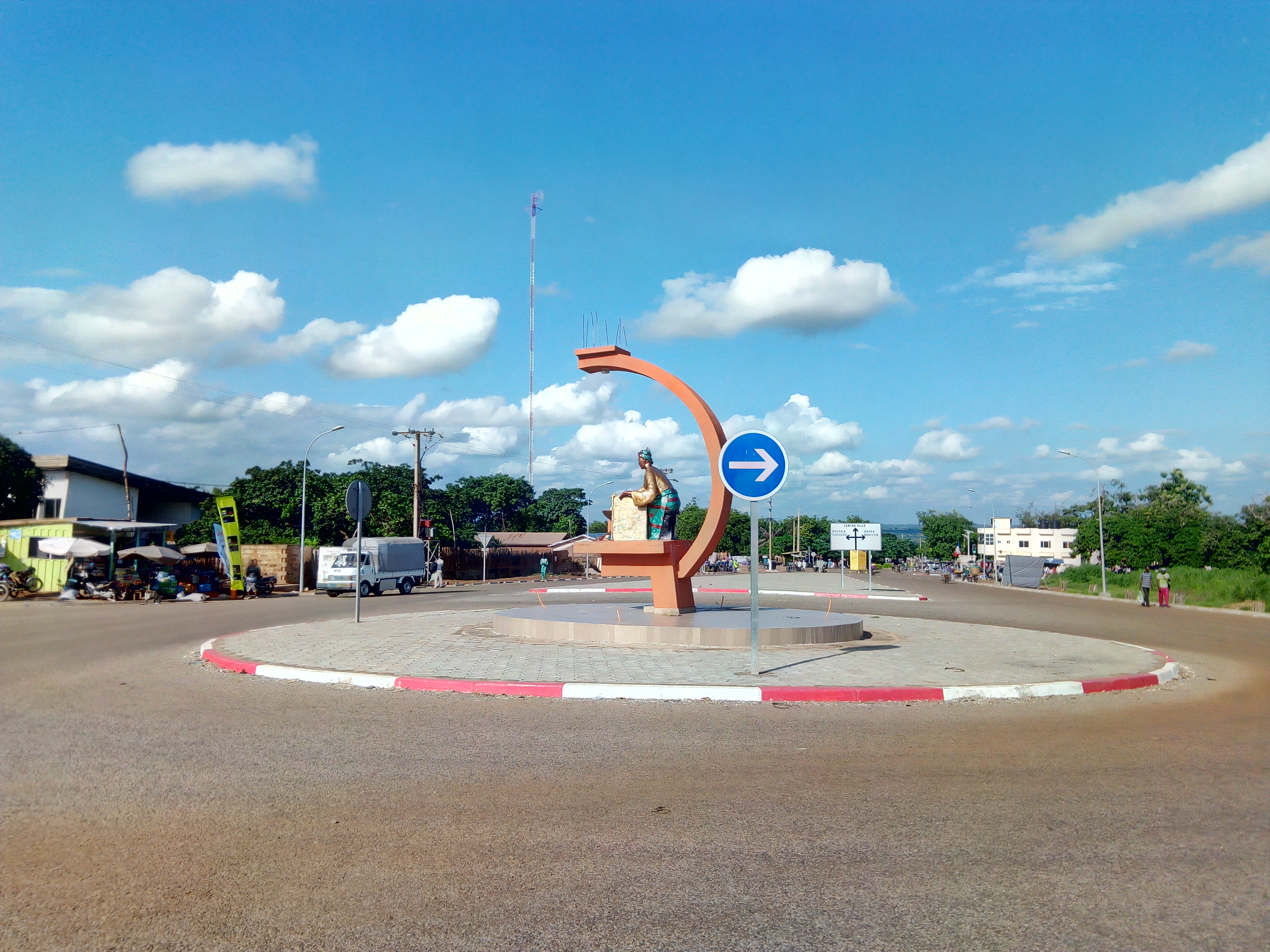

- Location in Benin
- Coordinates: 7°56′N 1°58′E
- Country: Benin
- Department: Collines Department

Area
  - Total: 2,674 km^{2} (1,032 sq mi)
- Elevation: 227 m (745 ft)

Population (2012)
  - Total: 35,433
  - Density: 13.25/km^{2} (34.32/sq mi)
- Time zone: UTC+1 (WAT)

Savalou [sa.va.lu] is a city located in the Collines Department of Benin. The commune covers an area of 2,674 square kilometres and as of 2012 had a population of 35,433 people. It is the birthplace of Olympic Beninese hurdler Odile Ahouanwanou.

Savalou, like many areas of Benin, is home to a constituent monarchy.

== Demographics ==
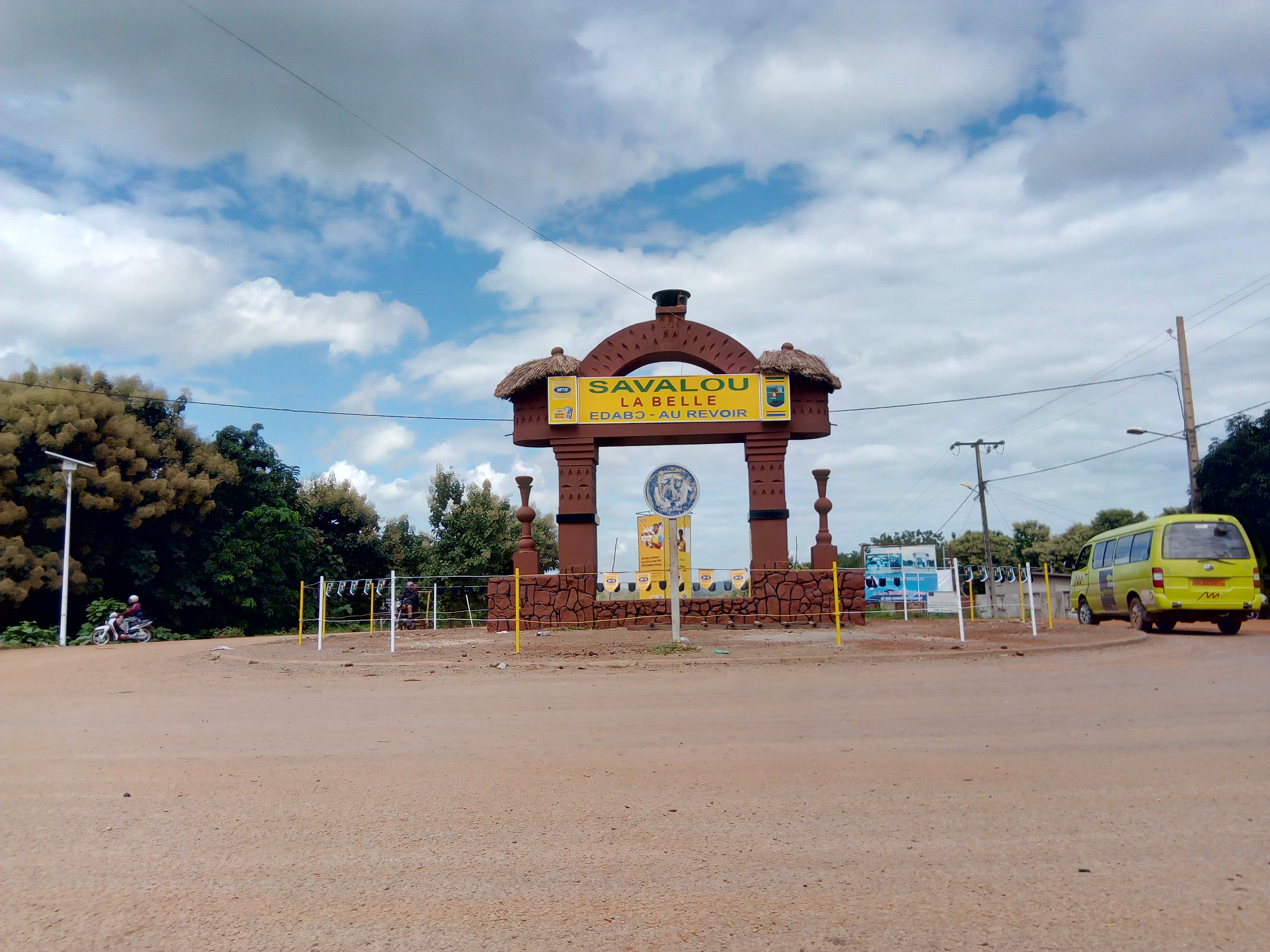
Road monument in Savalou bidding travellers goodbye, "Edabɔ"

According to the 2013 census, the town had 38,162 inhabitants and the commune had 144,549 inhabitants.

The population of Savalou is mostly made up of the Mahi and Ifè people. The Fon, Aja, Fulani, and Batammariba also live in the area. The main ethnic groups in the area are the Adja-Tado (made up of the Fon and Mahi), which make up 58% of the population, and Yoruba, which make up 32% of the population.

The main languages spoken in Savalou are French, Mahi, and Ifè.

A Vodún site called Dancoli (Dankoli), believed by adherents to be one of the most important sites to practice Vodún

== History ==
=== Kingdom of Savalou (1557–1894) ===
Savalou was historically the center of the Kingdom of Savalou, located in the western half of the Collines Department in modern-day Benin. The kingdom was founded in the sixteenth century by Soha Gbaguidi I.

==== Formation of the kingdom ====
The founder of the kingdom, Soha Gbaguidi (born Agba Rhako), became village chief of Damè when the former chief, Ligbo, died. Ligbo was Rhako's grandfather, as his father, who had fled his home village on the shores of Lake Ahémé after killing his brother, married Ligbo's daughter. After Ligbo's death, it was decided that whoever could succeed at taming a buffalo and riding it would become his successor. Rhako succeeded, becoming village chief, and was awarded the nickname 'Soha' (one who tamed the buffalo).

Soon, Rhako and his subordinates moved to the village of Houawé near Bohicon. He waged wars with the inhabitants of the region and eventually imposed his authority on them, mainly on the Yoruba, who nicknamed him 'Oba-Guidi' (true chief). This nickname would eventually transform into Gbaguidi over time. Rhako maintained good relations with another nearby chief, Do-Aklin, but after he died, his sons Gangni-Hessou and Dako-Donou were unable to tolerate Rhako's growing influence. Eventually, Dako-Donou forcefully subjugated all the chiefdoms in the region, including Rhako's.

Rhako, not wanting to resist Dako-Donou, migrated north with his subjects to the Honhoungo region, near the large Yoruba village of Tchébélou. Rhako soon conquered this village by tying burning straw to the feet of pigeons, who would land on the straw roofs of the village huts. Afterwards, he offered the chief of Tchébélou the help of his men to rebuild his village. He accepted and organized a banquet of gratitude to launch the reconstruction work. However, when the banquet ended, Rhako and his men surprise-massacred the population of Tchébélou and founded the village of Savalou on top of it to be the capital of his future kingdom.

Rhako subjugated the nearby localities of Doïssa, Ouèssè, Koutago, and Zounzonkanmè and founded the Kingdom of Savalou.

==== Vassal of Abomey ====
Though the kingdom enjoyed relative peace soon after its foundation, it suffered repeated attacks from the Kingdom of Abomey to the south. Savalou was able to resist them for over a century, but gradually became vassalized by Abomey in the middle of the 18th century after the capture of Gbowèlè in the kingdom's south.

After this, the rulers of Savalou were required to attend important events at the court of Abomey and kings of Savalou had to be approved by Kings of Abomey. The first instance of this was when King Tchaou Aditi Gbaguidi II, the second king and fifth ruler of Savalou, was deposed in favor of Baglo Gbaguidi III.

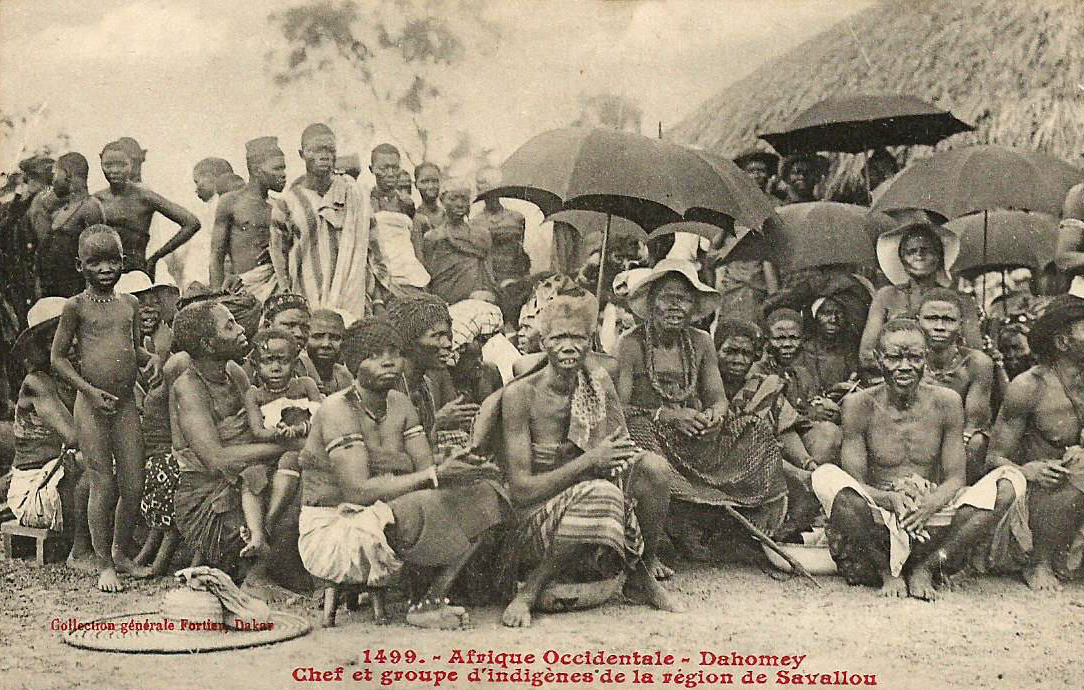
Chief and group of indigenous people from the Savallou region, Dahomey

==== French rule ====
Savalou was dependent on Abomey until Abomey's capture in December 1892 by the French general Alfred Dodds and his troops. On January 30, 1894, the seventh king of Savalou, Gbaguidi VIII, signed a treaty with Dodds to be put under protectorate status.

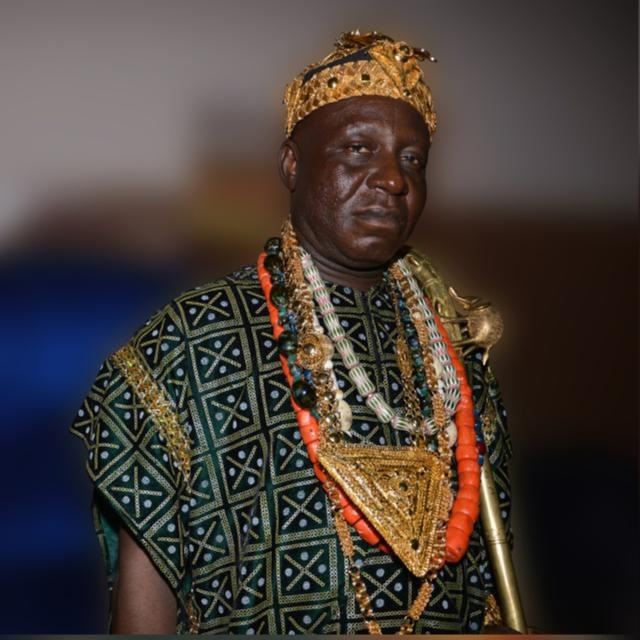
Former king of Savalou, Gbaguidi XIV (1956–2020)

=== List of Kings of Savalou ===
In total, four regents and seven kings have succeeded Soha Gbaguidi I on the throne of Savalou until the kingdom was placed under French protectorate status in 1894, during the reign of Gbaguidi VIII.

Name	Reign start	Reign end	Notes
Soha Gbaguidi I	1557	1642	King/founder
Adigli	1642	1657	Regent
Betêtê Ava	1657	1700	Regent
Gnahoui Kpoki	1700	1722	Regent
Tchaou Gbaguidi II	1722	1769	King (vassal to Abomey)
Baglo Gbaguidi III	1769	1794	King (vassal to Abomey)
Djeïzo Gbaguidi IV	1794	1804	King (vassal to Abomey)
Badébou Gbaguidi V	1804	1818	King (vassal to Abomey)
Gougnisso Gbaguidi VI	1818	1860	King (vassal to Abomey)
Lintonon Gbaguidi VII	1860	1878	King (vassal to Abomey)
Zoundégla Gbaguidi VIII	1878	1902	King (vassal to Abomey)
Zoundégla Gbaguidi VIII	1878	1902	King (vassal to Abomey) (1878–1892) King (1892–1894) King (under France) (1894–1902)
Goumoan Gbaguidi IX	July 14, 1902	February 4, 1928	King (under France)
Bahinnou Gbaguidi X	1928	1937	King (under France)
Gandigbé Gbaguidi XI	1937	1983	King (under France) King (in Benin)
Houessolin Gbaguidi XII	1983	2002	King (in Benin)
Tossoh Gbaguidi XIII	February 4, 2006	September 18, 2014	King (in Benin)
Gandjègni Awoyo Gbaguidi XIV	February 18, 2015	January 28, 2020	King (in Benin)
Dada Ganfon Gbaguidi XV	May 29, 2022		King (in Benin)
