= Ifangni =

- Commune and city
- Location in Benin
- Coordinates: 6°40′N 2°40′E
- Country: Benin
- Department: Plateau Department

Area
  - Total: 93 sq mi (242 km^{2})

Population (2013)
  - Total: 113,749
- Time zone: UTC+1 (WAT)

Ifangni [i.fɑ̃.ɲi] is a town, arrondissement, and commune in the Plateau Department of south-eastern Benin. The commune covers an area of 242 square kilometres and as of 2002 had a population of 113,749 (2013) people.
