= Glazoué =

- Commune and city
- Location in Benin
- Coordinates: 7°58′25″N 2°14′24″E
- Country: Benin
- Department: Collines Department

Area
  - Total: 520 sq mi (1,350 km^{2})

Population (2013)
  - Total: 124,431
- Time zone: UTC+1 (WAT)

Glazoué [gla.zu.e] is a town, arrondissement, and commune in the Collines Department of central Benin. It is located on the railway line from Cotonou to Parakou. The commune covers an area of 1350 square kilometres and as of 2013 had a population of 124,431 people.
