= Ouèssè =

- Commune and city
- Location in Benin
- Coordinates: 8°29′N 2°26′E
- Country: Benin
- Department: Collines Department

Area
  - Total: 1,200 sq mi (3,200 km^{2})

Population (2013)
  - Total: 141,760
- Time zone: UTC+1 (WAT)

Ouèssè [wɛ.sɛ] is a town, arrondissement, and commune in the Collines Department of central Benin.The commune covers an area of 3200 square kilometres and as of 2013 had a population of 141,760 people.
