= Dassa-Zoumé =

Dassa-Zoumé Igbó Ìdàáshà
- Commune and city
- View of Dassa from Coline des Princes, 2025

- Location in Benin
- Coordinates: 07°45′00″N 02°11′00″E
- Country: Benin
- Department: Collines Department

Area
  - Total: 661 sq mi (1,711 km^{2})

Population (2013)
  - Total: 112,118
- Time zone: UTC+1 (WAT)

Dassa-Zoumé [da.sa.zu.me], also known as Igbó Ìdàáshà or simply Dassa, is a city in central Benin, on the Cotonou-to-Parakou railway and the main north-south highway. It is the capital of Collines Department. The commune covers an area of 1,711 square kilometres (661 sq mi), and as of 2013 had a population of 112,118.

Jama'at Islamique Ahmadiyya Benin built its central mosque (Mosquée Moubarqiue) here in 2010, which has a tall 18-meter minaret, just outside the city on the main road towards Parakou. Jama'at Islamique Ahmadiyya Benin also built a French/English bilingual primary school here, called Ecole Primaire Publique Ahmadiyya.

The indigenous population of Dassa are the Idaasha. They migrated from the Egba subgroup of western Yoruba in present-day Nigeria to settle here. The city is known as a place of pilgrimage; the Virgin Mary is said to have appeared in the Grotte Notre-Dame d'Arigbo, around which a basilica has since been built containing several shrines. The city is also known for its surrounding forests and hills, many of which contain Orisa shrines.

Dassa is also home to a Yoruba constituent monarchy.

== History ==
The founders of the city of Dassa came from among the Egba people in Nigeria around the 12th century. The kingdom of Dassa was created around 1600 and was placed under a French protectorate in 1889.
