= Sakété =

- Commune and city
- Location in Benin
- Coordinates: 6°44′11″N 2°39′29″E
- Country: Benin
- Department: Plateau Department

Area
  - Total: 432 km^{2} (167 sq mi)

Population (2013)
  - Total: 114,207
- Time zone: UTC+1 (WAT)

Sakété [sa.ke.te] is a city of the Plateau Department of Benin. The commune covers an area of 432 square kilometres and as of 2013 had a population of 114,207 people. It is the birthplace of politician Rafiatou Karimou.
