= Savè =

- Commune and city
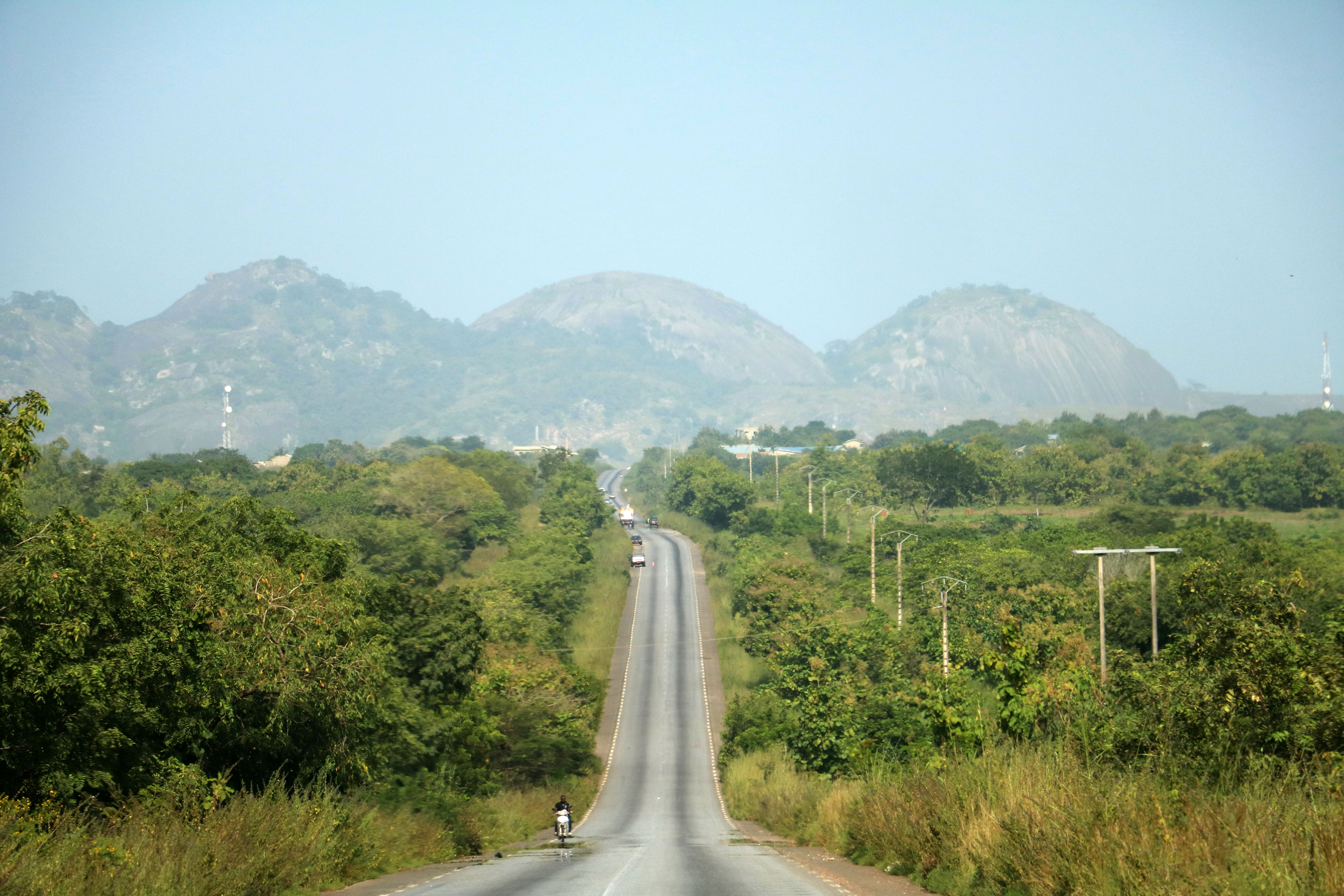

- Location in Benin
- Coordinates: 08°02′N 02°29′E
- Country: Benin
- Department: Collines Department

Area
  - Total: 2,228 km^{2} (860 sq mi)
- Elevation: 151 m (495 ft)

Population (2012)
  - Total: 97,309
- Time zone: UTC+1 (WAT)

Savè [sa.vɛ] is a city in Benin, lying on the Cotonou-Parakou railway and the main north–south road. It is known for its local boulders, popular with climbers. "Savè" is from the historical Yoruba name Ṣábẹ̀ẹ́.

The commune covers an area of 2228 square kilometres and as of 2002 had a population of 67,753 people.

== History ==
On the 30th of January 1894 there was a treaty for French protectorate status between Brigadier General Alfred-Amédée Dodds, the commander superior of French establishments in Benin and Oba Akenmu, King of the Confederation of Nago Tchabè. Subsequently in 1903, due to disagreements, the Oba (Onichabe) tried to shift the Anglo-French border delineation westwards from the Okpara river to the Weme river in order to integrate the Shabe territory beginning at the north of Tchatchou into the same colonial authority as that of the Oyo and the Egba to the east under British Nigeria. For this, the Oba was arrested and served a one year jail term. He was later deported to Porto-Novo in 1902-1911.

In 1922, a small building served as a chapel for the Protestant Methodist mission in "Anu Abata" located in front of the Royal Palace and then later on, the estate currently housing the Salem Temple of Savè donated by Oba Akenmu. In 1924 the first catholic missionaries arrived.

== Climate ==
Climate data for Save (1991–2020)
Month	Jan	Feb	Mar	Apr	May	Jun	Jul	Aug	Sep	Oct	Nov	Dec	Year
Mean daily maximum °C (°F)	35.9 (96.6)	37.5 (99.5)	36.9 (98.4)	35.1 (95.2)	33.6 (92.5)	31.9 (89.4)	30.2 (86.4)	29.5 (85.1)	30.6 (87.1)	32.2 (90.0)	34.8 (94.6)	35.6 (96.1)	33.6 (92.5)
Daily mean °C (°F)	28.9 (84.0)	30.6 (87.1)	30.6 (87.1)	29.5 (85.1)	28.5 (83.3)	27.3 (81.1)	26.3 (79.3)	25.7 (78.3)	26.4 (79.5)	27.3 (81.1)	28.8 (83.8)	28.8 (83.8)	28.2 (82.8)
Mean daily minimum °C (°F)	21.8 (71.2)	23.7 (74.7)	24.3 (75.7)	23.9 (75.0)	23.4 (74.1)	22.7 (72.9)	22.3 (72.1)	21.8 (71.2)	22.1 (71.8)	22.4 (72.3)	22.8 (73.0)	21.9 (71.4)	22.8 (73.0)
Average precipitation mm (inches)	8.1 (0.32)	19.2 (0.76)	57.7 (2.27)	106.7 (4.20)	123.2 (4.85)	154.3 (6.07)	154.1 (6.07)	139.8 (5.50)	170.1 (6.70)	121.4 (4.78)	12.5 (0.49)	2.5 (0.10)	1,069.6 (42.11)
Average precipitation days (≥ 1.0 mm)	1	2	5	9	12	13	14	14	16	12	1	0	99
Average relative humidity (%)	51	55.6	63.3	70.9	75.1	77.8	80.4	81.7	80.3	77.5	67.8	56.7	69.8
Mean monthly sunshine hours	223	211.4	223.1	215.2	219.4	182	124.3	96.4	127.4	194.6	231.9	239.3	2,288
Source: NOAA

== Transport ==
Savè is served by a station of the Benin Railways system.

== See also ==
- Railway stations in Benin
