= Pobè =

- Commune and city
- Location in Benin
- Coordinates: 6°58′N 2°41′E
- Country: Benin
- Department: Plateau Department

Area
  - Total: 400 km^{2} (150 sq mi)
- Elevation: 39 m (128 ft)

Population (2013)
  - Total: 123,740
  - Density: 310/km^{2} (800/sq mi)
- Time zone: UTC+1 (WAT)

Pobè [pɔ.bɛ] is a city and arrondissement located in the Plateau Department of Benin. The commune covers an area of 400 square kilometres and as of 2013 had a population of 123,740 people.
