= Plateau Department =

Department of Benin

Plateau
- Department
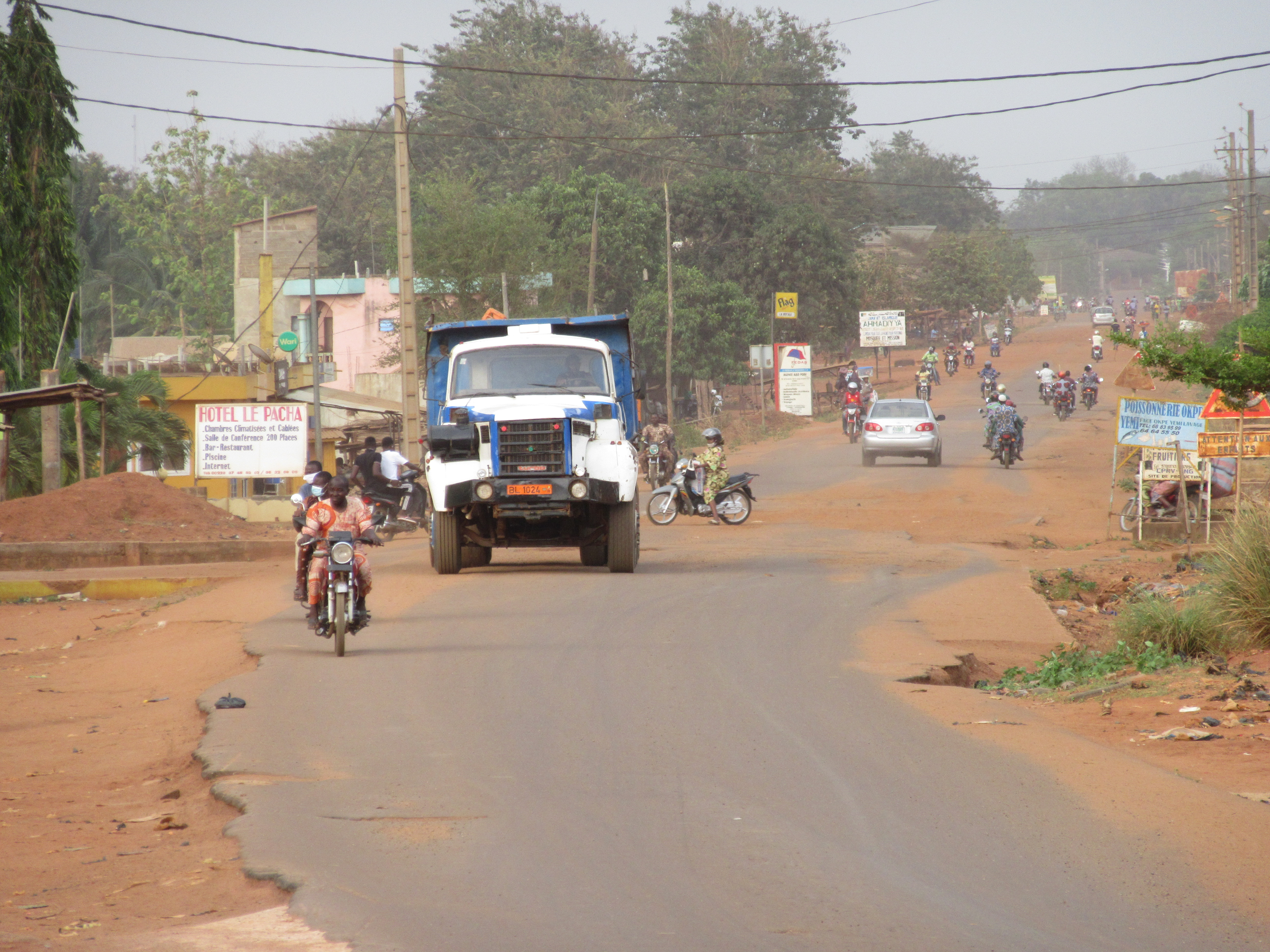
- Street scene from the town of Pobe

- Plateau Department is number 8 in the map.
- Coordinates: 6°58′N 2°41′E
- Country: Benin
- Capital: Pobè

Area
  - Total: 3,264 km^{2} (1,260 sq mi)

Population (2013 census)
  - Total: 624,146
  - Density: 191.2/km^{2} (495.3/sq mi)
- Time zone: UTC+1 (WAT)

Plateau [pla.to] is one of the twelve departments of Benin. The department of Plateau was created in 1999 with an area of 2,835 square kilometres (1,095 sq mi) when it was split off from Ouémé Department. Plateau is subdivided into five communes, each centred at one of the principal towns: Adja-Ouèrè, Ifangni, Kétou, Pobè and Sakété.

As of 2013, the total population of the department was 622,372, with 300,065 males and 322,307 females. The proportion of women was 51.80%. The total rural population was 54.80%, while the urban population was 45.20%. The total labour force in the department was 185,815, of which 43.10% were women. The proportion of households with no level of education was 65.50%.

== Geography ==
Plateau Department border Collines Department to the north, Nigeria to the east, Ouémé Department to the southwest, and Zou Department to the west. It is characterised by plateaus ranging from 20 to 200 m (66 to 656 ft) above the mean sea level. The plateaus are split by valleys running from north to south, created by the Iguidi river. The river deposits of clay have rich iron ore deposits underneath; there is siliceous clay and forested area around the river basin. The southern regions of Benin receive two spells of rain from March to July and September to November, while the northern regions of the country receive one season of rainfall from May to September. The country receives an average annual rainfall of around 1,200 mm (47 in).

=== Settlements ===
Sakété is the departmental capital; other major settlements include Idigny, Ifangni, Ita-Djèbou, Kétou and Pobè.

== Demographics ==
Religious census
Religion	Percent(%)
Catholic	24.6%
Muslim	18.6%
Other Christian	15.8%
Celestial Church	10%
Vodoun	7.4%
Methodist	5.6%
Other Traditional	3.3%
Other Protestant	3.8%
Other	4%

According to Benin's 2013 census, the total population of the department was 622,372, with 300,065 males and 322,307 females. The proportion of women was 51.80%. The total rural population was 54.80%, while the urban population was 45.20%. The proportion of women of childbearing age (15 to 49 years old) was 24.30%. The foreign population was 2,605, representing 0.40% of the total population in the department. The labour force participation rate among foreigners aged 15–64 years was 31.70%. The proportion of women among the foreign population constituted 42.50%. The number of households in the department was 110,532 and the average household size was 5.6. The intercensal growth rate of the population was 3.80%.

Among women, the average age of first marriage was 21.4 and the average age at maternity was 28.8. The synthetic index of fertility of women was 4.7. The average number of families in a house was 1.3 and the average number of persons per room was 1.7. The total labour force in the department was 185,815, of which 43.10% were women. The proportion of households with no level of education was 65.50% and the proportion of households with children attending school was 60.00%. The crude birth rate was 36.2, the general rate of fertility was 149.10 and the gross reproduction rate was 2.30.

The population is predominantly Yoruba of the following subgroups: the Nagot group at 45.7% and the Ohori (also known as the Holli) at 20.9%, for a total of 66.6% of the department's population. The Yoruba group is followed by the Fon group of the following subgroups: Ogu at 12.4% of the population, Fon at 8.2% of the population, and Torri at 6.5%.

== Administrative divisions ==
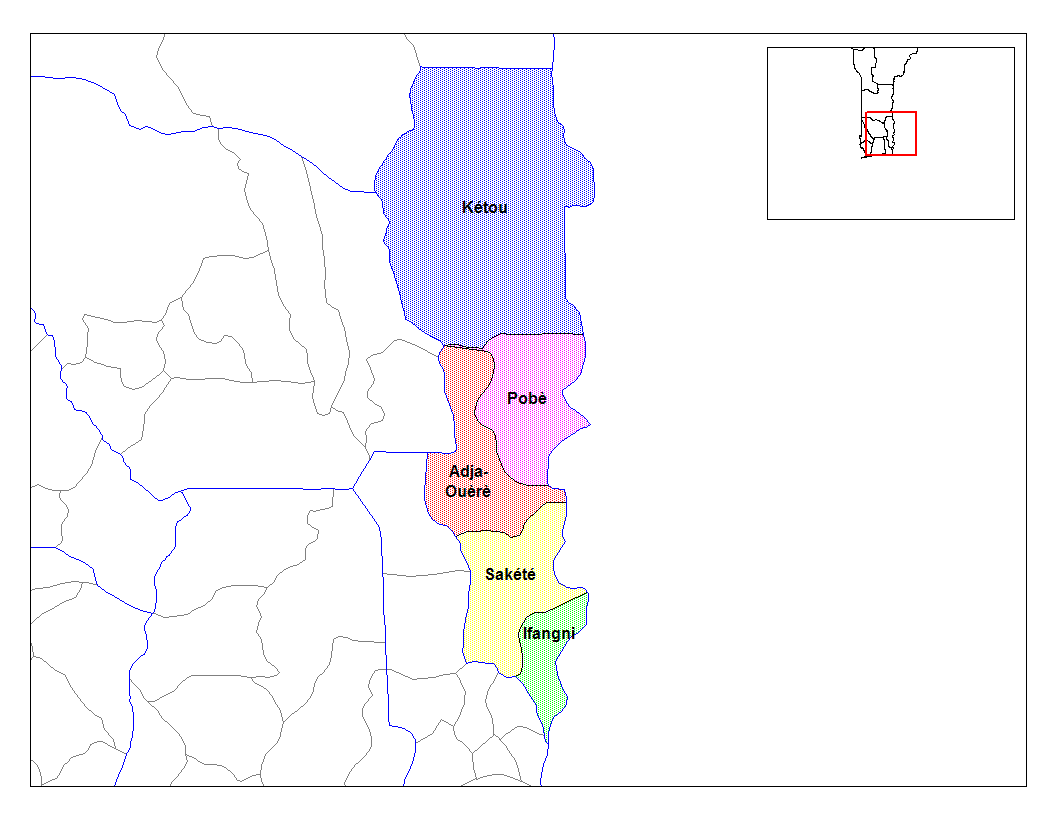
Communes of Plateau

The department of Plateau was created in 1999 when it was split off from Ouémé Department. It has an area of 2,835 square kilometres (1,095 sq mi). Plateau is subdivided into five communes, each centered at one of the principal towns: Adja-Ouèrè, Ifangni, Kétou, Pobè and Sakété.

Benin originally had six administrative regions (départements), which have now been bifurcated to make 12. Each of the deconcentrated administrative services (directions départementales) of the sectoral ministries takes care of two administrative regions. A law passed in 1999 transformed the sous-prefectures, the lowest level of territorial administration, into local governments. Municipalities and communal councils have elected representatives who manage the administration of the regions. The latest elections of the municipal and communal councils were held in June 2015.
