= Collines Department =

Department of Benin

Collines
- Department
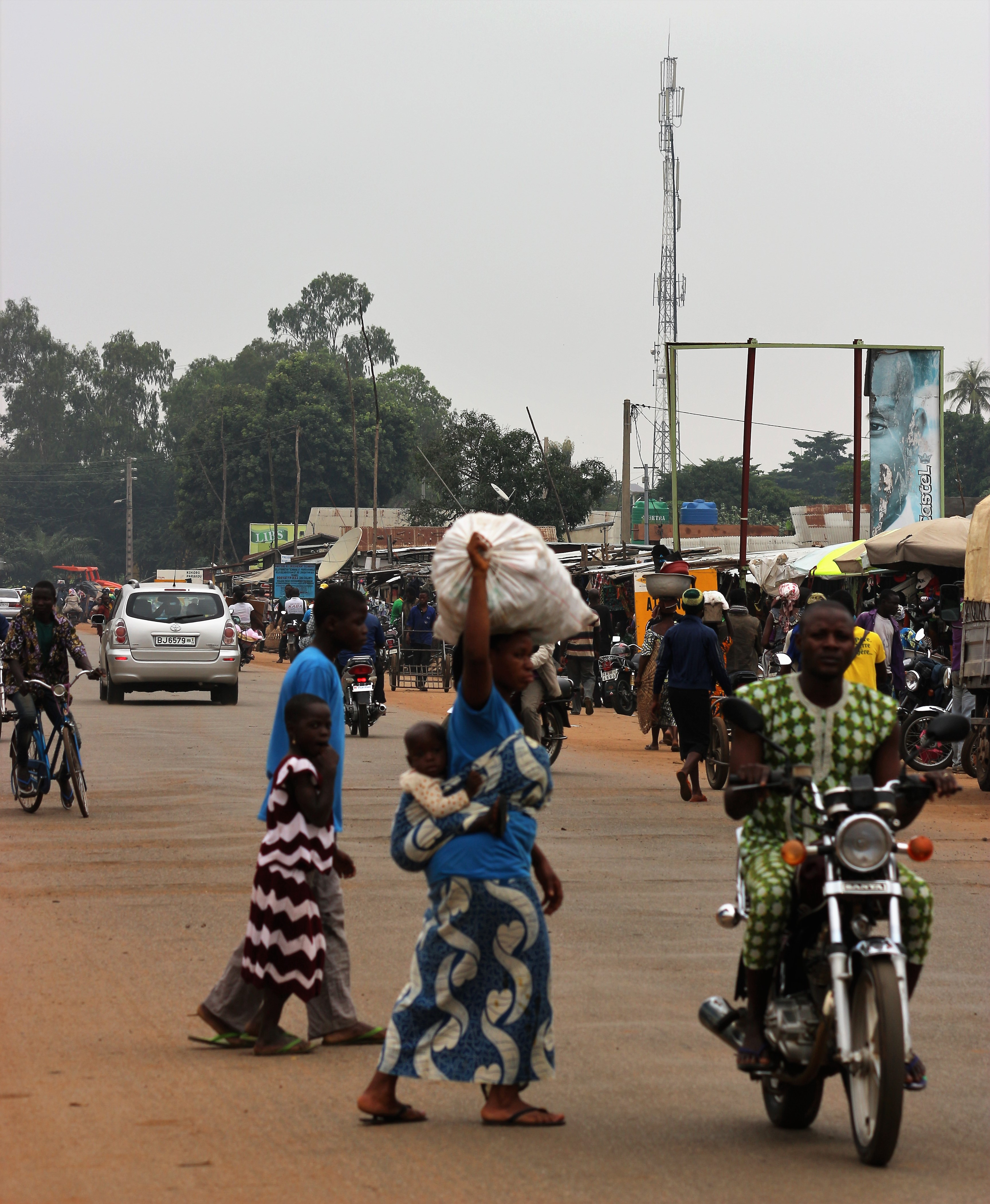
- Busy street scene in Dassa
- Interactive map of Collines
- Coordinates: 7°56′00″N 1°58′00″E
- Country: Benin
- Capital: Dassa-Zoumé

Area
  - Total: 13,931 km^{2} (5,379 sq mi)

Population (2013 census)
  - Total: 716,558
  - Density: 51.436/km^{2} (133.22/sq mi)
- Time zone: UTC+1 (WAT)

Collines ([kɔ.lin], "hills") is one of the twelve departments of Benin, located in the centre of the country. The department of Collines was created in 1999 when it was split off from Zou Department. In 2016, the city of Dassa-Zoumé (also called Igbo Idaasha) became the department's capital (formerly Savalou was the capital).

As of 2013, the total population of the department was 717,477, with 353,592 males and 363,885 females. The proportion of women was 50.70%. The total rural population was 72.50%, while the urban population was 27.50%. The total labour force in the department was 213,069, of which 45.30% were women. The proportion of households with no level of education was 57.60%.

== Geography ==
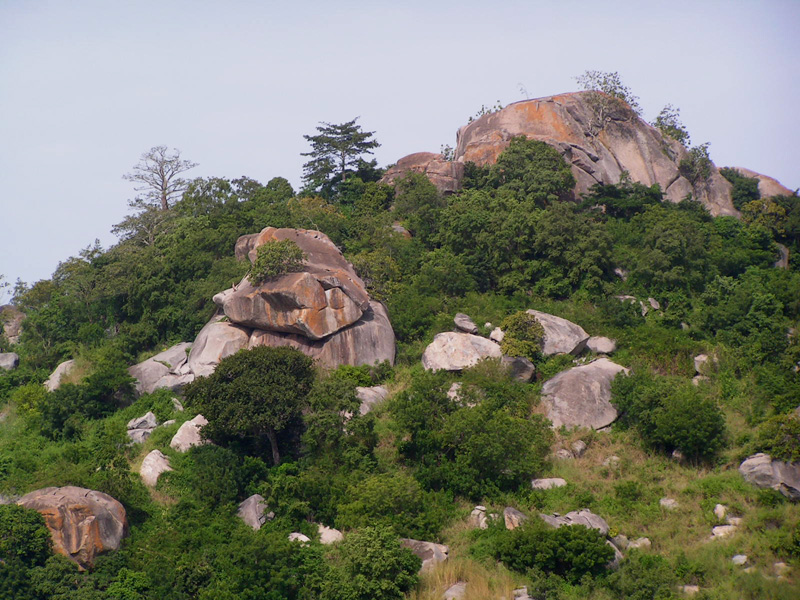
The granite hills around Dassa-Zoumé

Collines Department borders Donga Department and Borgou Department to the north, Nigeria to the east, Plateau Department and Zou Department to the south, and Togo to the west. The topography of Collines is characterised by plateaus ranging from 20 to 200 m (66 to 656 ft) above the mean sea level; the plateaus are split by valleys running from north to south, created by the Couffo, Zou and Oueme rivers. The southern regions of Benin receive two seasons of rainfall from March to July and September to November, while the northern regions of the country receive one season of rainfall from May to September. The country receives an average annual rainfall of around 1,200 mm (47 in).

=== Settlements ===
Dassa-Zoumé is the departmental capital; other major settlements include Glazoué, Kilibo, Savalou and Savè.

== Demographics ==
Religious census
Religion	Percent(%)
Catholic	37.2%
Muslim	16.3%
Other Christian	10.5%
Methodist	8%
Celestial	6.6%
Vodoun	5.9%
Other Protestant	2.2%
Other Traditional	1.2%
Other	4.1%

According to Benin's 2013 census, the total population of the department was 717,477, with 353,592 males and 363,885 females. The proportion of women was 50.70%. The total rural population was 72.50%, while the urban population was 27.50%. The proportion of women of childbearing age (15 to 49 years old) was 23.50%. The foreign population was 9,647, representing 1.30% of the total population in the department. The labour force participation rate among foreigners aged 15–64 years was 41.60%. The proportion of women among the foreign population constituted 46.30%. The number of households in the department was 129,159 and the average household size was 5.6. The intercensal growth rate of the population was 2.60%.

Among women, the average age at first marriage was 21 and the average age at maternity was 28.2. The synthetic index of fertility of women was 5.1. The average number of families in a house was 1.3 and the average number of persons per room was 1.9. The total labour force in the department was 213,069, of which 45.30% were women. The proportion of households with no level of education was 57.60% and the proportion of households with children attending school was 72.50%. The crude birth rate was 37.6, the general rate of fertility was 160.40 and the gross reproduction rate was 2.50.

The main ethnic groups in the department, according to the latest national census, are the Nagot group at 46.8% and Idaasha at 14.9%, followed by the Mahi at 25.7%, or just over a quarter of the region's population, while the Fon represent 13% of the population. Other ethnolinguistic groups in the department include the Aguna, Biali, Ede and Tchumbuli.

== Administrative divisions ==
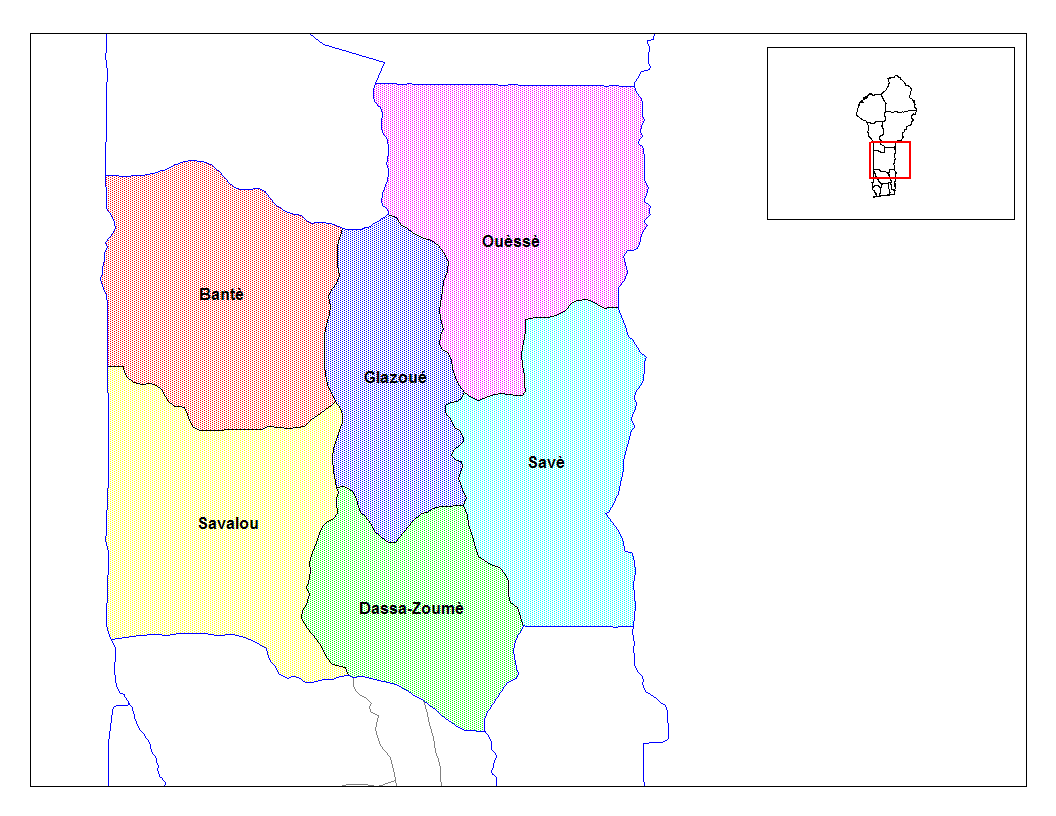
Communes of Collines

The department of Collines was created in 1999 when it was split off from Zou Department, with Savalou as its original capital. In 2016, the city of Dassa-Zoumé (also called Igbo Idaasha) became the department's capital. Collines is subdivided into six communes, each centered at one of the principal towns: Bantè, Dassa-Zoumé, Glazoué, Ouèssè, Savalou and Savé.

Benin originally had six administrative regions (départements), which have now been bifurcated to make 12. Each of the deconcentrated administrative services (directions départementales) of the sectoral ministries takes care of two administrative regions. A law passed in 1999 transformed the sous-prefectures, the lowest level of territorial administration, into local governments. Municipalities and communal councils have elected representatives who manage the administration of the regions. The latest elections of the municipal and communal councils were held in June 2015.
