= Departments of Benin =

Departments of Benin Départements du Bénin (French)
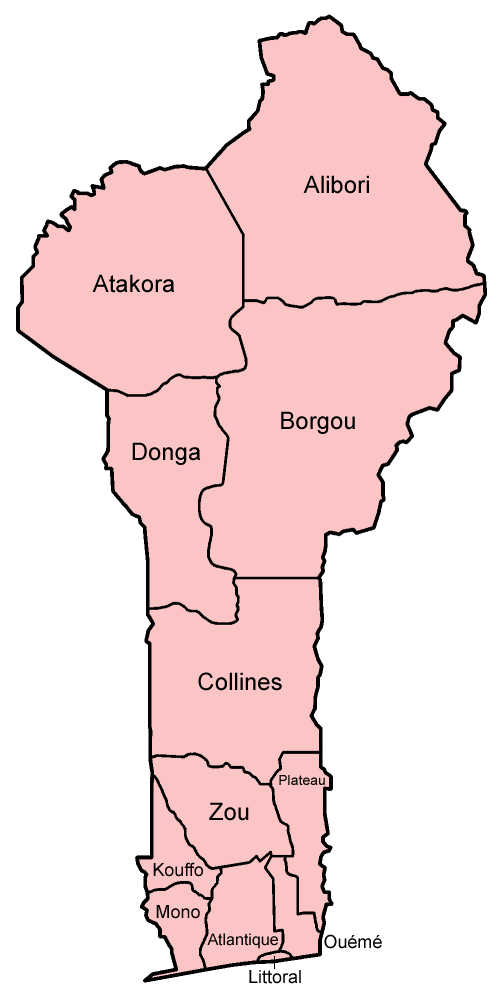
- Category: Unitary state
- Location: Republic of Benin
- Number: 12
- Populations: 495,307 (Mono) – 1,396,548 (Atlantique)
- Areas: 80 km^{2} (31 sq mi) (Littoral) – 26,240 km^{2} (10,132 sq mi) (Alibori)
- Government: Region government, national government
- Subdivisions: Commune

Benin is divided into 12 departments (French: départements), and subdivided into 77 communes (see Communes of Benin). In 1999, the previous six departments were each split into two halves, forming the current 12. Each of the six new departments was assigned a capital in 2008.

Map key	Department	Capital	Population (2013)	Area (km^{2})	Population density (per km^{2} in 2013)	Former Department	Region	Sub-Region
2	Alibori	Kandi	868,046	26,242	33.1	Borgou	North	North East
1	Atakora	Natitingou	769,337	20,499	37.5	Atakora	North	North West
10	Atlantique	Allada	1,396,548	3,233	432	Atlantique	South	South Centre
4	Borgou	Parakou	1,202,095	25,856	46.5	Borgou	North	North East
5	Collines	Dassa-Zoumé	716,558	13,931	51.4	Zou	South	South Centre
6	Kouffo	Aplahoué	741,895	2,404	308.6	Mono	South	South West
3	Donga	Djougou	542,605	11,126	48.8	Atakora	North	North West
11	Littoral	Cotonou	678,874	79	8,593.3	Atlantique	South	South Centre
9	Mono	Lokossa	495,307	1,605	308.6	Mono	South	South West
12	Ouémé	Porto-Novo	1,096,850	1,281	856.2	Ouémé	South	South East
8	Plateau	Pobè	624,146	3,264	191.2	Ouémé	South	South East
7	Zou	Abomey	851,623	5,243	162.4	Zou	South	South Centre

Population Map of the 12 Departments of Benin. (Note: Some Departments have missing population data at wikidata)

Total Benin population (wikidata:Q962) = 14,111,034 (2023 estimation)
(WD = Wikidata page)

[Hide/show Department list]
No.	Benin	pop.	year
1	Alibori Department	867,463	2013^{WD}
2	Atacora Department	not found	^{WD}
3	Atlantique Department	not found	^{WD}
4	Borgou Department	not found	^{WD}
5	Collines Department	not found	^{WD}
6	Donga Department	not found	^{WD}
7	Couffo Department	741,895	2013^{WD}
8	Littoral (Benin)	678,874	2013^{WD}
9	Mono Department	not found	^{WD}
10	Ouémé Department	1,096,850	2013^{WD}
11	Plateau Department	not found	^{WD}
12	Zou Department	not found	^{WD}

== See also ==
- Arrondissements of Benin
- ISO 3166-2:BJ, the ISO codes for the departments of Benin
