= Isha people =

Ìshà
Total population
- ~130,000 (2013)

Regions with significant populations
- · Collines Department; Bantè Commune: 117,051; Savalou Commune: ~ 10,000 · Donga Department; Scattered Communities

Religion
- Christianity · Yoruba religion Islam (minority)

The Isha sometimes spelt Ica, and Itcha are a relatively small group of the Yoruba people, situated in the western parts of middle Benin, West Africa, especially in the town of Bantè and other surrounding communities in the Collines Department.

== Geography ==
The Ishas are bounded to the north by the Northern Nago groups of the Bassila arrondissement, to the east by the Mahi-Gbe people, to the south and the west, by Ife-Ana people. The region is characterized by large concentrations of villages. These villages have on average about three thousand individuals who usually, mostly belong to the lineage of the original founding groups. The terrain is about 70% plateau covered in rolling grassland savannah and 20% hills of varying elevations of between 200 and 400 meters, the highest among them being Koubete and Olaje hills, while the other 10% is lowland and water bodies. The Isha live in a zone of transition between the sub-equatorial climate of southern Benin and the Guinea-Sudan climate of northern Benin. The dry season generally lasts from December to March, while the rainy season from April to November. The average annual rainfall between the years 2005 and 2009 was 1093 mm.

== History ==
The Isha have been at their present location for a very long time. Ethnographers are of the belief that the whole of middle /central Benin was historically covered by a large Yoruba group called the Isha. Upon subsequent periods of tumults and wars, other groups came to be found in the area as well, especially the Mahi, a Fon offshoot, whose settlement divided the previous local population into eastern and western groups. The eastern groups include the Shabe and Idaasha, whose territories are contiguous with the rest of Yorubaland, while the Ana-Ifes, Ishas and Northern Nago-Manigri groups form the left bank groups. This is evidenced in the remnant or articles of "Isha" which are replete in the names of settlements in the area, which include, but are not limited to: Idaasha, Shawuru, Isha, Ishabe, E.tc.

The history and present social dynamic of the group who presently self identify as Isha is a result of long migratory movements accompanied by numerous wars and conquests. Indeed, the Ife people and Isha were formed by three successive waves of migration from further east in present-day Nigeria. The first and the oldest are said to have migrated from Ilesha. The two most recent, from Oyo and Ile-Ife. The first Isha villages founded are: Banon, Bobe, Adjantè, Djédia, Kubètè, Koko, Lougba, Akpassi and Djagballo. This is the first nucleus that gave birth to the current Isha people in central Benin. This original Isha group from Ilesha were the largest group and the first to settle at the present site. After passing through the towns of Tchaourou and later Bassila, they first settled in Eastern Togo, in the regions of Popo and Kpessi, but they had to later retreat into the collines of Benin due to pressure from marauding soldiers of Opoku ware, king of the Ashanti.

The most recent of the migration waves, that of Oyo were led by a hunter named Obinti who had a long stay in the hills of Igbo Idaasha then Igbo Ogou forest, before settling in the current Ile lakun quarter of Bante. Then came the Ife group led by a warrior called Oji. They crossed Agbassa, Igbo-Ilu-odji (now Igbo-Nan-odji) to occupy today Ilé-Ilu-odji (Lozin). Ultimately, the current Ife and Isha country was gradually established through the original migratory waves of Ijesha, Oyo and Ife Yoruba groups from Nigeria.

== Community ==
The Isha society is patrilineal in nature, and married women move off to live with their husbands and his family. Villages generally comprise multiple homes, each home containing one or more extended families and others living under the authority of the court Head, (Baba Ile). Inside the courtyard (Agbo-Ile), there are a number of homes clustered around small courtyards (Ojulé) to the end of which is a small court (Ba-Ile). Organization is in a maze in which stratification match the different kinship groups. The human ideal pursued by the Isha sociocultural group is the Ọmọlúwàbí (literally meaning the child that the Lord has created), the perfect model human in deeds and in character.

Agriculture remains the main economic activity of Isha land with an involvement rate of around 63.57%. Corn, peanuts, Yams, Cassava, Cotton, Cowpea, Cashew, Pepper, Sesame, Beans, Soybeans, Pigeon peas and Fruits are the products that provide money to residents. The importance of land used for each plant varies from one locality to another.

=== Settlements ===
Isha townsvillages include Bantè, Agoua, Akpassi, Atokoligbé, Bobè, Koko, Gouka, Lougba and Pira, which are also all arrondissements or local divisions under the Commune of Bante.

== Dialect ==
The Isha people refer to their dialect as Ede Isha, or simply Isha. According to Ethnologue, the dialect exhibits a Lexical similarity of 83% with spoken Yoruba of Porto-Novo.
