= Khathing =

Khathing is a Tangkhul Naga surname. Notable people with the surname include:

- Darlando T. Khathing, Indian academic
- Ralengnao Khathing (1912–1990), Indian soldier, civil servant, and diplomat

== See also ==
- List of Naga surnames
