= Angami name =

Naming customs of Angami culture

An Angami name (including Chakhesang, the former Eastern Angami) consists of a given name followed by a middle name and a surname, as used by the Angami and Chakhesang Nagas in the Indian state of Nagaland. Angami names (given and surname) are usually diverse compared to other Naga communities. Each Angami Village is divided into clans (Thinuo/Thenü), followed by Sarami which are the surnames of an individual.

== Surnames ==
The following is a list of some common Angami surnames:

- Koso
- Liezietsu
- Rio
- Yhoshü

Surnames are also divided into family name/middle name such as:

- Kevichüsa

== See also ==
- Indian name
