= Żarnowiec, Silesian Voivodeship =

Żarnowiec
- Village
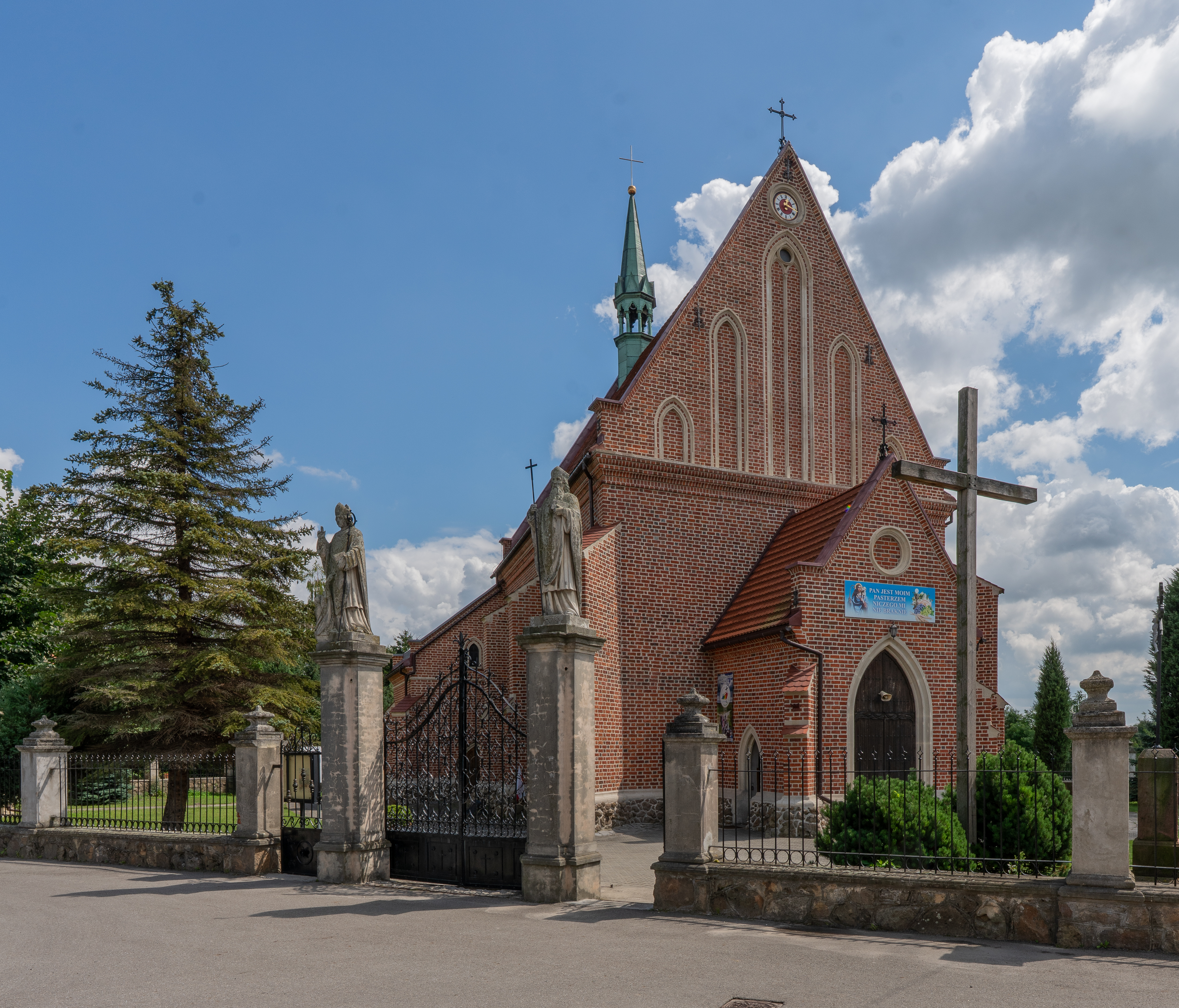
- Church of the Nativity of the Virgin Mary

- Location within Poland
- Coordinates: 50°29′4″N 19°51′47″E
- Country: Poland
- Voivodeship: Silesian
- County: Zawiercie
- Gmina: Żarnowiec

Population
  - Total: 830
- Time zone: UTC+1 (CET)
  - Summer (DST): UTC+2 (CEST)
- Vehicle registration: SZA

Żarnowiec [ʐarˈnɔvjɛt͡s] is a village in Zawiercie County, Silesian Voivodeship, in southern Poland. It is the seat of the gmina (administrative district) called Gmina Żarnowiec. Even though the village now belongs to Silesian Voivodeship, it is part of the historical region of Lesser Poland.

== Location ==
Żarnowiec lies in northeastern corner of Silesian Voivodeship, on the Pilica River, among the hills of the Kraków-Częstochowa Upland. The village belongs to Lesser Poland.

== History ==
=== Medieval period ===
The village was first mentioned in the Chronicle of Gallus Anonymus, who wrote that near Żarnowiec, Duke Władysław I Herman met with his sons Zbigniew of Poland and Bolesław III Wrymouth. Most probably this meeting took place in 1098. Originally, Żarnowiec was located in the area of today's village of Łany Wielkie. Some time between 1326 and 1340, the town was moved 3 kilometers north along the Pilica River, where it has remained. The previous location of Żarnowiec was in 1388 renamed as Old Żarnowiec. In 1388 the name was changed to Łany, and in 1529 to Łany Wielkie.

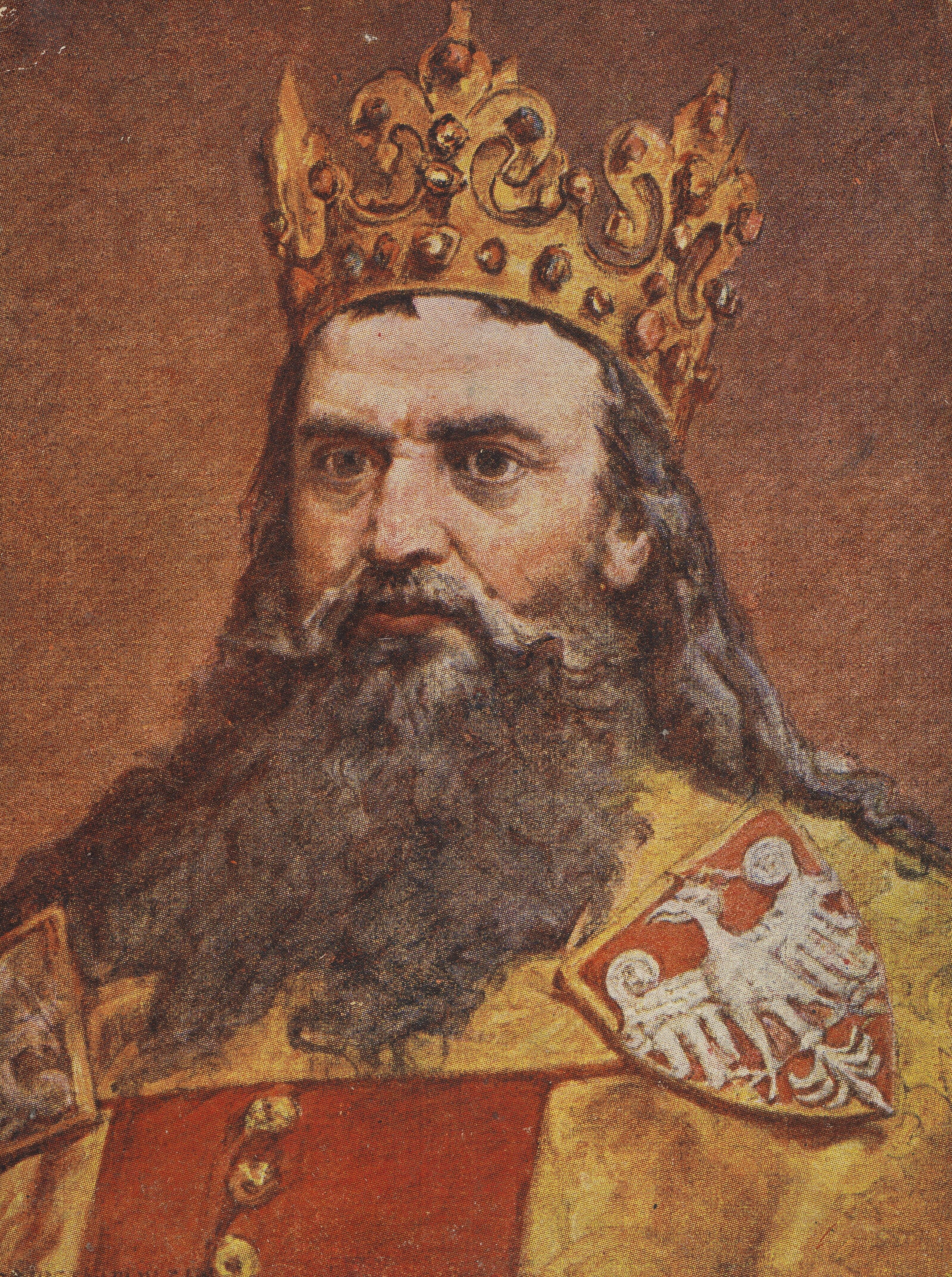
Polish King Casimir III the Great vested Żarnowiec with town rights in the 14th century

Żarnowiec was granted town rights by King Casimir III the Great some time between the 1320s and 1340s. There are theories that it had been incorporated earlier, in the 1250s, by Duke Bolesław V the Chaste. The first local church of Saint Wojciech was built here between 999 and 1243. The parish church at Łany Wielkie now occupies this site. King Casimir III the Great contributed a lot to the development and prosperity of the town. It was due to his initiative that a castle was built here, as well as a church. In 1355–56, Casimir III the Great imprisoned his wife Adelaide of Hesse at Żarnowiec Castle. The king frequently visited the town.

In the 14th century Żarnowiec emerged as a center of local administration. King Władysław Jagiełło also visited the town, confirming its privileges in 1396.

=== Modern period ===
Żarnowiec was the seat of a county, located in the Kraków Voivodeship in the Lesser Poland Province. In the 16th century Żarnowiec was one of the most important urban centers of Lesser Poland, and the seat of a starosta. In 1570 it had 50 beer producers, and around 200 houses.

But, like most towns of Lesser Poland, Żarnowiec was destroyed by the Swedes in the Deluge (1655 - 1660) related to its invasion of the area. The town population was decimated by the war. The great fire of 1697 destroyed what was left after the wars. In 1756 there were 129 houses at Żarnowiec, of which 78 were empty. In 1775, Żarnowiec castle burned.

In the Third Partition of Poland in 1795, the town was annexed by the Austrian Empire. The population did not start to grow until this period, due mostly to an increase in Jewish settlers from other parts of the empire. They made up more than 50% of town's population by the 1850s. After the Polish victory in the Austro-Polish War of 1809, it became part of the short-lived Duchy of Warsaw.

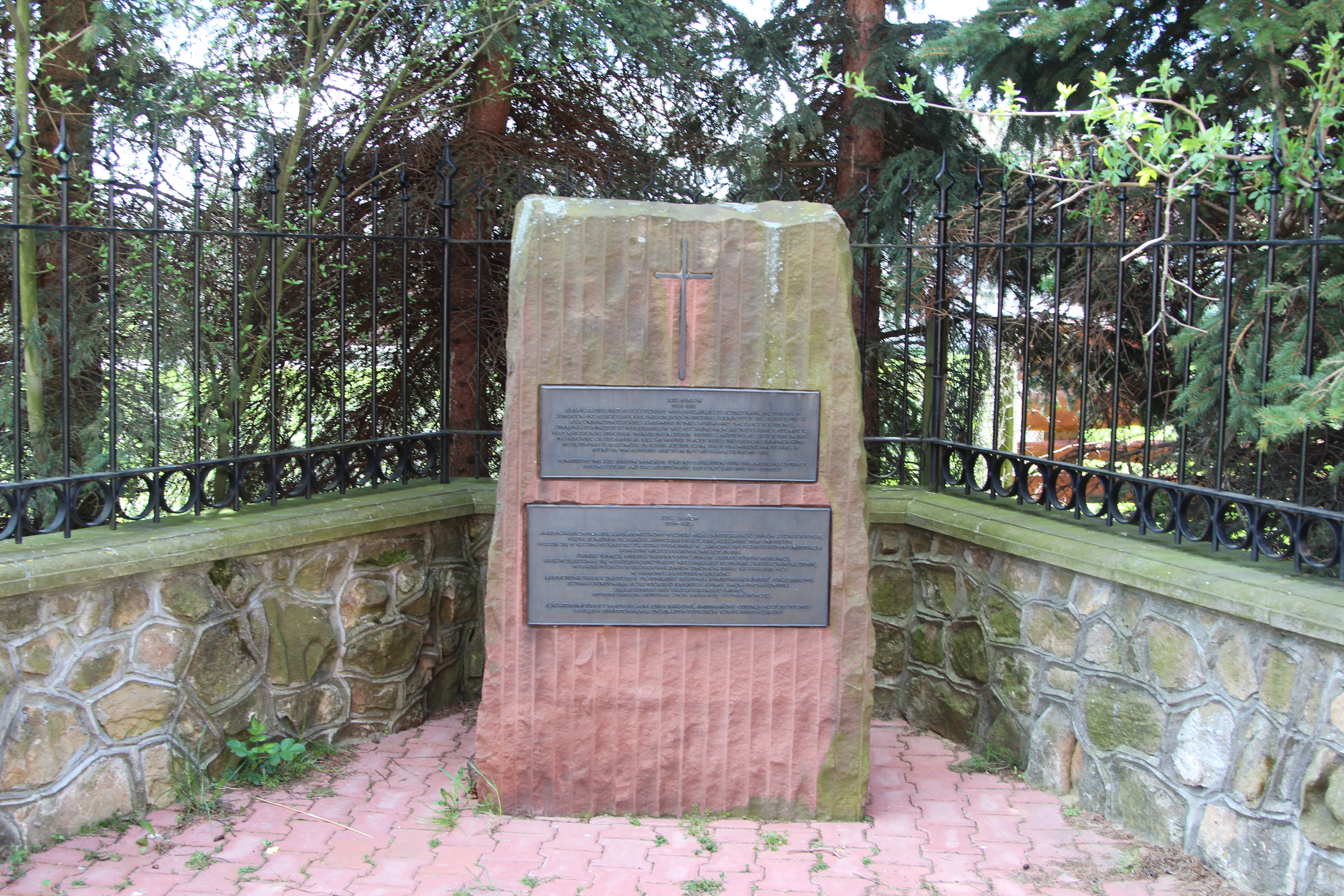
Memorial to Joel Barlow

The American writer and diplomat Joel Barlow died here in 1812. As the United States Minister to France, he had traveled to Vilnius to meet with the French foreign minister, who was there in relation to Napoleon's invasion of Russia. Upon his arrival, Barlow learned that the Grande Armée was already in full retreat from Moscow. On his way back to Paris by way of Vienna, Barlow became ill and died of pneumonia in Żarnowiec.

After 1815, Żarnowiec became part of the Russian-controlled Congress Kingdom. The town burned again in 1816. Twenty years later, the construction of a main road from Kraków to Warsaw bypassed Żarnowiec, which contributed to the town's long-term decline. During the January Uprising, Żarnowiec was one of the centers of rebellion; a battle with the Russians took place here on February 20, 1863. As a punishment, Russian government demoted Żarnowiec to the status of a village (June 1, 1869). Poland eventually regained independence and control of the settlement after World War I in 1918.

=== Interbellum and World War II ===
In 1925, the Jewish Community, including some residents from small nearby villages, consisted of a total of 1,780 people; some 118 families were chosen to pay the community fees. Other families were exempted because of poverty. Some Jews were emigrating to the United States, joining family who had gone before. About 1930 the Jewish community owned a brick synagogue in Warszawska Street, which had a rabbi's prayer room and women's gallery next to the main hall. What was known as the "old synagogue", made of wood, was also located in Warszawska Street. The mikvah adjacent to the new synagogue was leased. The cemetery was located by the road leading to the village of Chlina.

In 1930, the population of Żarnowiec alone was 2,127 people, including 920 Jews. Some emigrated to other countries or migrated to cities for work. By 1938 the Jewish population had declined to 574. Most of villagers died after the 1939 invasion of Poland by Germany and the subsequent Holocaust, which included persecution, and deportation to concentration and death camps. The Polish resistance movement was active in Żarnowiec, including a local unit of the Home Army under the cryptonym "Żołna".

== Sights ==
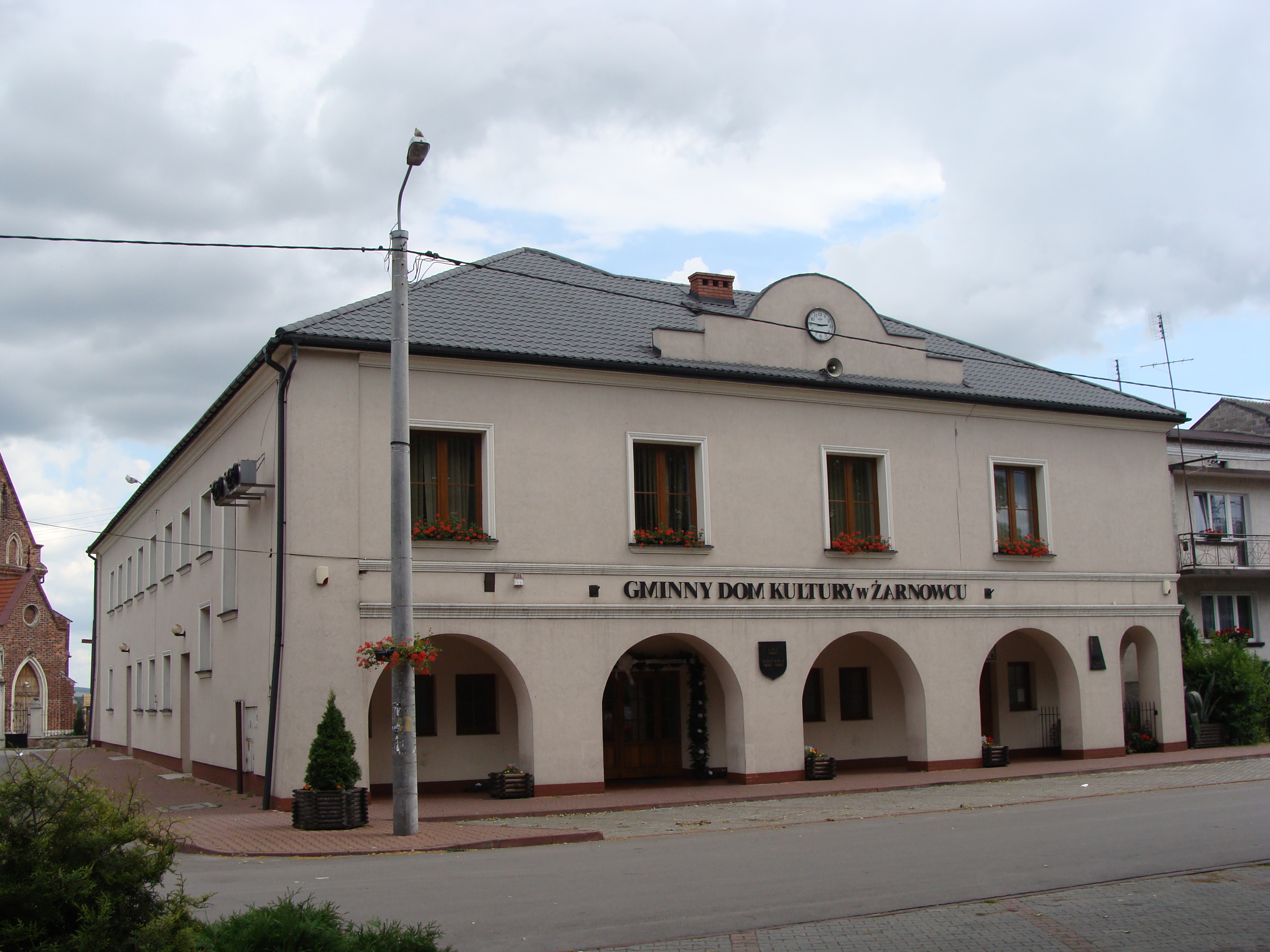
House of Culture

- Market square, established in the 14th century
- 14th-century Parish church
- Tadeusz Kościuszko Mound (1918)
- 19th-century bell tower, with a bell from 1551
- Monument dedicated to Joel Barlow, US Minister to France
