= Atokou =

- Location in Benin
- Coordinates: 8°18′N 1°54′E
- Country: Benin
- Department: Collines Department
- Commune: Bantè

Atokou is a village in western Benin. It is located in Bantè commune in the Collines Department.

Nearby towns and villages include Lero (4.0 nm), Akpouati (1.0 nm), Keon (1.0 nm), Kikon (4.2 nm) and Okpedie(5.4 nm) .
