= Okpedie =

- Location in Benin
- Coordinates: 8°13′N 1°52′E
- Country: Benin
- Department: Collines Department
- Commune: Bantè

Okpedie is a village in western Benin. It is located in Bantè commune in the Collines Department.

Nearby towns and villages include Alekpo (12.4 nm), Pepelou (12.4 nm), Kikon (2.2 nm), Atokou (5.4 nm), Noiamo (5.4 nm), Keon (5.8 nm), Amou (10.3 nm), Kafingbe (5.1 nm), Gbede (3.6 nm) and Malomi (2.8 nm).
