= Gouka =

Gouka may refer to:

- 9708 Gouka, a main-belt asteroid after the Dutch astronomer Adriaan Gouka
- Eric Gouka (born 1970), Dutch cricketer
- Gouka, Benin, a town and arrondissement
