= Kafingbe =

- Location in Benin
- Coordinates: 8°8′N 1°53′E
- Country: Benin
- Department: Collines Department
- Commune: Bantè

Kafingbe is a village in western Benin. It is located in Bantè commune in the Collines Department.

Nearby towns and villages include Amou (7.2 nm), Okpedie (5.1 nm), Aloba (1.4 nm), Gbede (2.2 nm), Sako (3.0 nm), Abidzi (2.0 nm) and Konfouda (2.0 nm).
