= Alekpo =

- Location in Benin
- Coordinates: 8°7′N 1°41′E
- Country: Benin
- Department: Collines Department
- Commune: Savalou

Alekpo is a village in western Benin. It is located in Savalou commune in the Collines Department.

Nearby towns and villages include Kotongbo (4.1 nm), Apaki (3.6 nm), Otola (2.8 nm), Bouboule (12.5 nm), Amou (6.7 nm), Kikon (12.7 nm), Okpedie (12.4 nm), Lekpa (2.2 nm) and Akoumokoumo (1.0 nm).
