= Ralengnao Khathing =

Indian diplomat

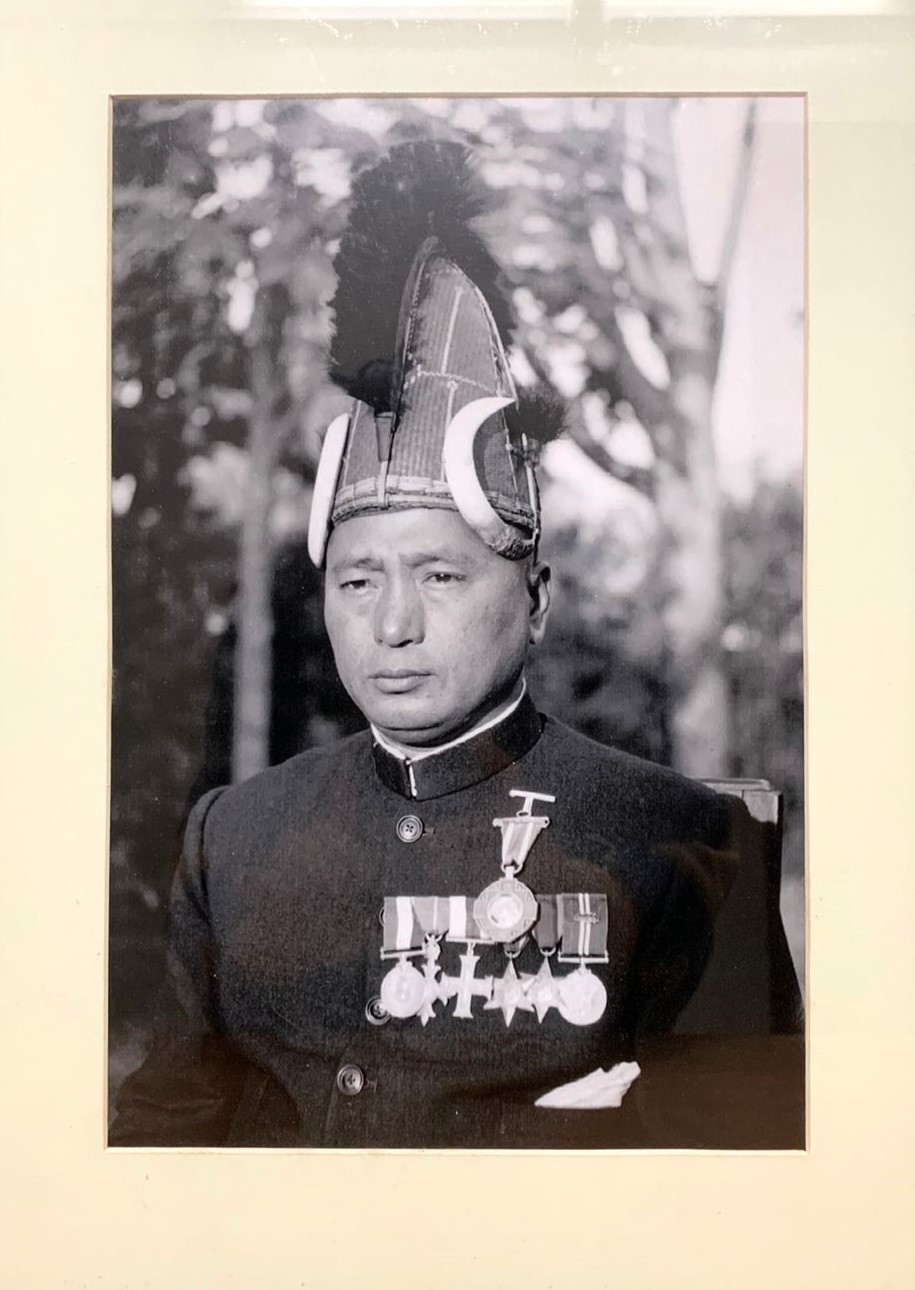
- Born: 28 February 1912; Ukhrul, Manipur (princely state), British Raj
- Died: 12 January 1990 (aged 77); Mantripukhri, Imphal, Manipur, India
- Resting place: Valley View; 24°50′54″N 93°56′09″E
- Occupations: Army major, civil servant, diplomat
- Children: 4
- Awards: Padma Shri; Member of the Order of the British Empire; Military Cross; C-in-C Gallantry Certificate

Ralengnao Khathing MC, MBE (1912–1990), also known as Bob Khathing, was an Indian soldier, civil servant and diplomat and the first person of tribal origin to serve as an Ambassador for India. Khathing was a Tangkhul Naga from the Ukhrul district of Manipur. As a political officer of independent India, Khathing led the first armed forces into Tawang that established Indian control in the region. The Government of India honoured Khathing in 1957 with the award of Padma Shri, the fourth highest Indian civilian award for his services to the nation.

== Biography ==
Ralengnao Khathing was born on 28 February 1912 (date of birth disputed, other reports stating it as 25 February and 8 February) at Ukhrul, a suburban district near Imphal, in the princely state of Manipur in a Tangkhul family. He did his schooling at Kangpokpi Mission ME School and Johnstone Higher Secondary School, Imphal and joined Cotton College, Guwahati of Calcutta University from where he graduated, becoming first tribal graduate from the Manipur. In 1942, he was commissioned as 2nd Lieutenant in the British Indian Army joining the 19th Hyderabad Regiment (later day Kumaon Regiment). Khathing was the first Manipur officer holding the King's Commission, and he was also the first to become Captain and Major in the Indian Army.

Khathing fought in World War II, first as the Commissioner of the 19th Hyderabad Regiment and then as the Local Captain of the V Force Operations in Manipur. He won a Military Cross for his valour.

=== Government of Manipur ===
On advice from the then Maharaja of Manipur, Khathing retired from the Army after the war and joined the Government of Manipur as the Minister for Hills Administration. After the Indian independence, he was elected to the first Manipur Assembly, in 1948, representing Sadar Hills constituency and served as the Minister for Hills Administration and Manipur Rifles. After Manipur's merger into the Indian Union, he was selected as the Assistant Commandant of the 2nd Battalion of Assam Rifles. During his tenure there, he was involved with the rescue and rehabilitation operations in the wake of the 1950 earthquake in Assam.

=== Political and administrative service ===
The next assignment was as the Assistant Political Officer of North East Frontier Agency (NEFA). Under his leadership, two platoons of Assam Rifles took possession of Tawang in 1950, establishing Indian administrative control in the Bum La area along McMahon Line.

In 1953, the Government of India constituted the Indian Frontier Administrative Service (IFAS) and Khathing was inducted as one of the two officers of the civil service. His first posting as an IFAS officer was at Tuensang Frontier Division as the Political Officer in 1954 and his contribution is reported in the establishment of the Village Volunteer Force. After four years at the post, he was promoted as the first Deputy Commissioner of Mokokchung district. In 1961, he became the first Indian citizen to study at the National Defence College, New Delhi and completed the course in its second batch. The next year, he was posted as the Development Commissioner of Sikkim but the tenure was short-lived as he was transferred as the Security Commissioner of NEFA when the Sino-Indian War of 1962 broke out. He also worked as the Chief Civil Liaison Officer of IV Corps, Tezpur and his contributions are reported in the formation of Sashastra Seema Bal, a paramilitary force established following the 1962 war.

Khathing became the Chief Secretary of Nagaland in 1967. It was during his tenure, the Nagaland Armed Police and Naga Regiment were established. Five years later, he became the first Indian tribal to become an Ambassador when he was selected as the Indian Ambassador to Burma, in 1972. He worked in Burma for three years and retired from service in 1975. Though the post of a State Governor was offered to him, he declined it but served as the Advisor to the Governor of Manipur, as the chairman, Tribal Law Commission and Administrative Reforms Commission and the Chairman of the Administrative Commission, Nagaland. He also served as a member of the committee to finalise the 16-point agreement that led to the Shillong Accord of 1975 and the formation of the state of Nagaland.

== Death ==
Khathing died at his home at Valley View, Mantripukhri, Imphal, on 12 January 1990. He had four children, two sons, John Somi R Khathing and Darlando Thanmi Khathing, and two daughters, Leballa Khathing Gupta and Sela N Khathing. John Khathing is a former chief commissioner of Customs and Central Excise and Darlando was the first vice-chancellor of the Central University of Jharkhand. The eldest daughter, Leballa serves as the secretary of the All India Kitchen Garden Association while the younger daughter, Sela, is a professor and Head of the Department of English at Lady Keane College, Shillong.

== Awards and recognitions ==
Khating was awarded the Military Cross by the British Empire for his services to the British Army during World War II. Later, the Queen of the United Kingdom honoured him with the title of Member of the Order of the British Empire (MBE).

The Government of India awarded him the fourth highest civilian award of Padma Shri in 1957, the first person from the state of Manipur to receive the award. He was also a two time recipient of the Gallantry Certificate of the Commander-in-Chief of the Indian Army.

R. R. Hill near Bomdila is named after Major Khating, where a small memorial stands

== Award gallery ==
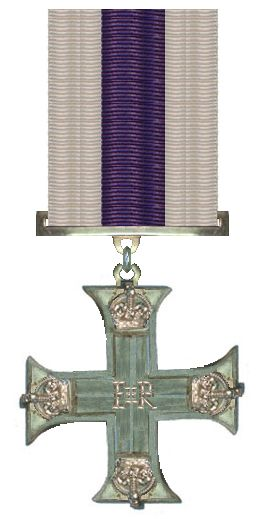
Military Cross

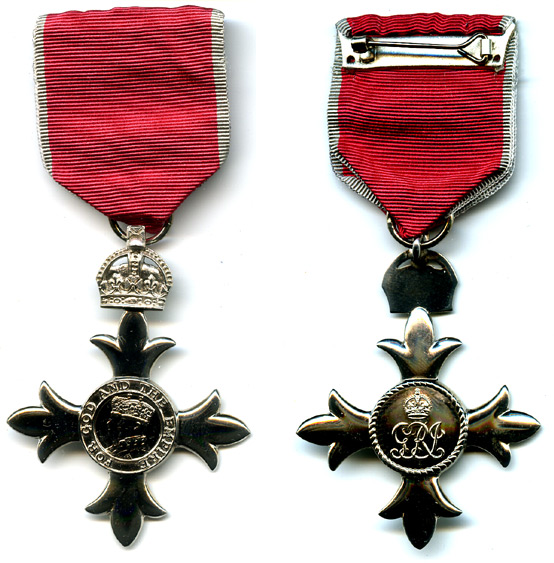
Order of the British Empire

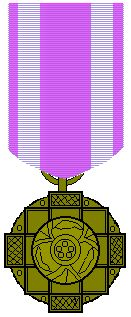
Padma Shri

== See also ==
- North East Frontier Agency
- V Force
- Sashastra Seema Bal
- Shillong Accord of 1975
