= Shaiza =

Shaiza is a Tangkhul Naga surname. Notable people with the surname include:

- Hangmila Shaiza (1920–1997), Indian politician
- Kanrei Shaiza, Indian historian
- Rano M. Shaiza (1928–2015), Indian politician
- Shimreingam Shaiza (d. 1998), Indian Army officer
- Yangmaso Shaiza (1923–1984), Indian politician

== See also ==
- List of Naga surnames
