= Yhoshü =

Yhoshü is an Angami people surname. Notable people with the surname include:

- Sesino Yhoshü, Indian filmmaker
- Vikho-o Yhoshü (1952–2019), Indian politician

== See also ==
- List of Naga surnames
- Yoshu
