= Łany Małe =

- Village
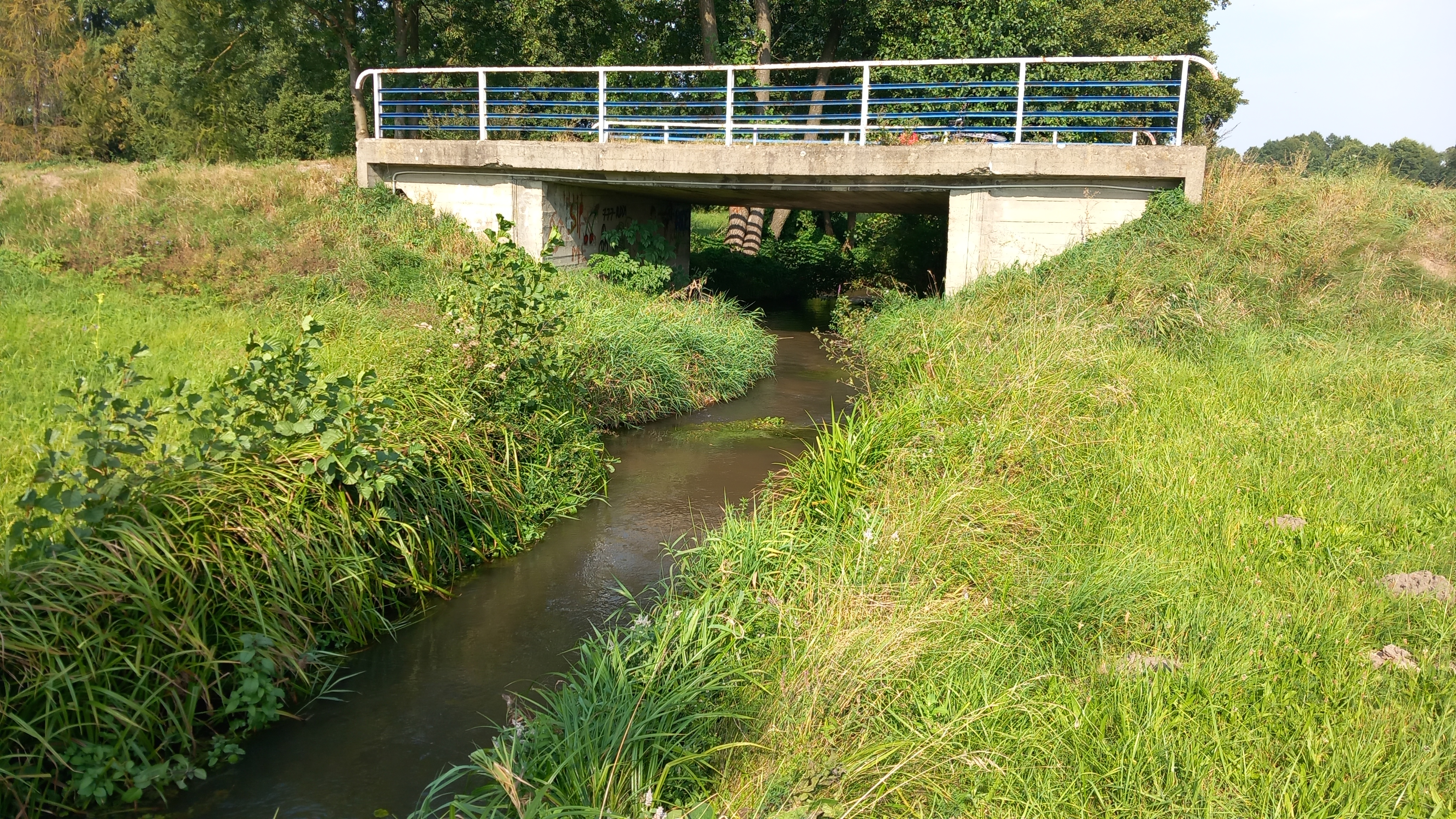

- Location within Poland
- Coordinates: 50°29′N 19°51′E
- Country: Poland
- Voivodeship: Silesian
- County: Zawiercie
- Gmina: Żarnowiec

Łany Małe [ˈwanɨ ˈmawɛ] is a village in the administrative district of Gmina Żarnowiec, within Zawiercie County, Silesian Voivodeship, in southern Poland.
