= Zamiechówka =

- Village
- Location within Poland
- Coordinates: 50°28′N 19°51′E
- Country: Poland
- Voivodeship: Silesian
- County: Zawiercie
- Gmina: Żarnowiec

Zamiechówka [zamjɛˈxufka] is a village in the administrative district of Gmina Żarnowiec, within Zawiercie County, Silesian Voivodeship, in southern Poland.
