= Longkümer =

Longkümer is an Ao Naga surname. Notable people with the surname include:

- Imtikümzük Longkümer (1967–2018), Indian politician
- Macnivil (Akaba Martin Longkümer) (born 1992), musician
- Sharingain Longkümer (born 1981), Indian politician
- Temjen Imna Along (Temjen Imna Along Longkümer) (born 1980), Indian politician
- Temsüyanger Longkümer, artist

== See also ==
- List of Naga surnames
