= Ostra Górka, Zawiercie County =

Ostra Górka
- Settlement
- Location within Poland
- Coordinates: 50°31′48″N 19°46′31″E
- Country: Poland
- Voivodeship: Silesian
- County: Zawiercie
- Gmina: Żarnowiec

Ostra Górka [ˈɔstra ˈɡurka] is a settlement in the administrative district of Gmina Żarnowiec, within Zawiercie County, Silesian Voivodeship, in southern Poland.
