= Brzeziny, Zawiercie County =

Brzeziny
- Village
- Location within Poland
- Coordinates: 50°31′29″N 19°49′37″E
- Country: Poland
- Voivodeship: Silesian
- County: Zawiercie
- Gmina: Żarnowiec

Brzeziny [bʐɛˈʑinɨ] is a village in the administrative district of Gmina Żarnowiec, within Zawiercie County, Silesian Voivodeship, in southern Poland.
