= Udórz =

- Village
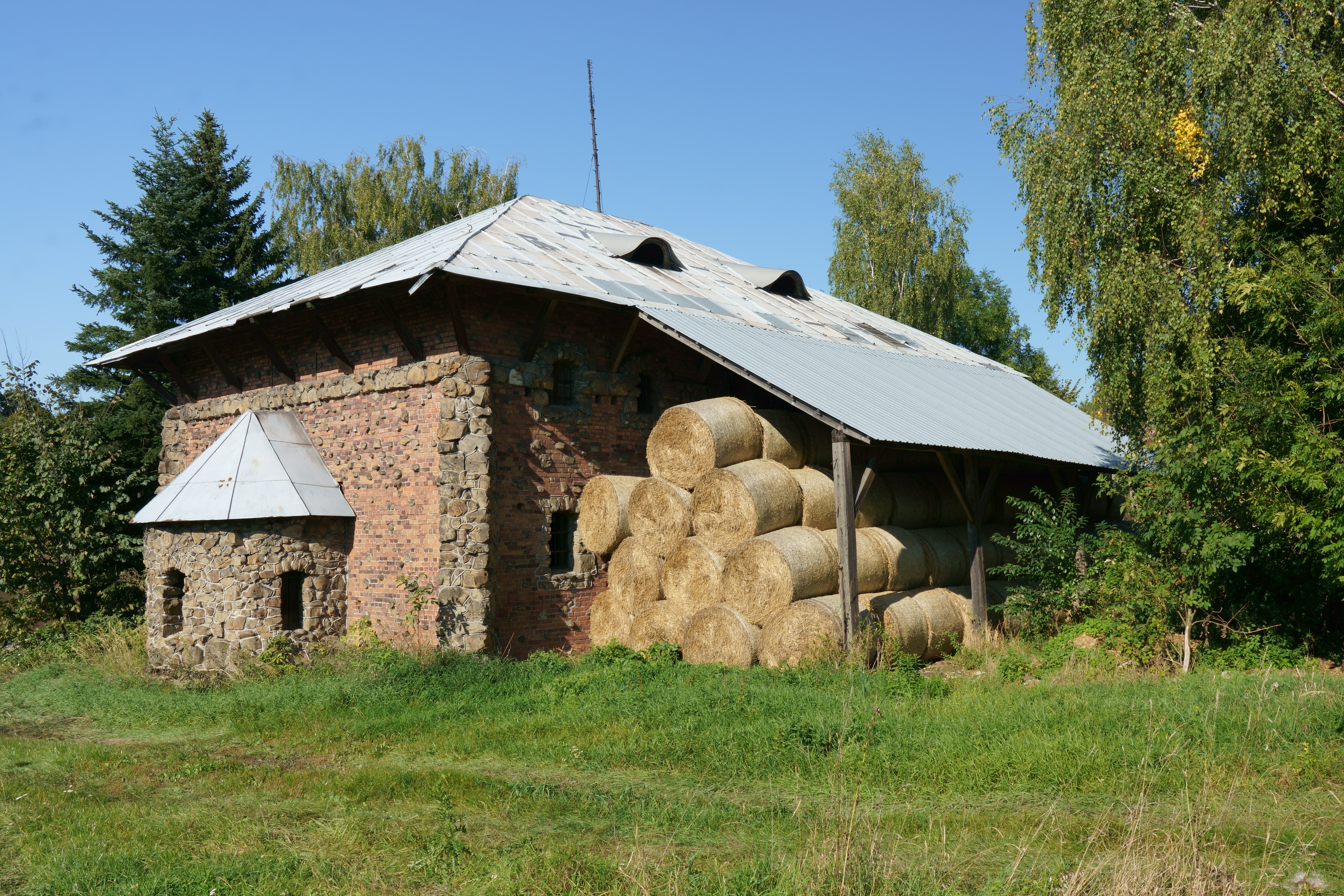
- Interactive map of Udórz
- Location within Poland
- Coordinates: 50°27′30″N 19°47′12″E
- Country: Poland
- Voivodeship: Silesian
- County: Zawiercie
- Gmina: Żarnowiec

Udórz [ˈuduʂ] is a village in the administrative district of Gmina Żarnowiec within Zawiercie County, Silesian Voivodeship in southern Poland.
