= Koso (Angami surname) =

Angami surname

- Pronunciation: Koso
- Language: Angami

Origin
- Meaning: Win streak
- Region of origin: Viswema (Nagaland, India)

Koso is an Angami people surname in Nagaland. It is a family name of the Yeri-mi clan from Viswema. The descendants are referred to as Kosonümiko.

== Notable people ==
- Viseyie Koso (b. 1984), Sportsperson
- Vizol Koso (1914–2008), First Naga pilot (Royal Indian Air Force during World War II) and Chief Minister of Nagaland (1974–1975; 1977–1980)

== See also ==
- Angami name
- List of Naga surnames
- Koso (disambiguation) (other meanings)
