= Abeokouta =

- Location in Benin
- Coordinates: 8°2′N 1°41′E
- Country: Benin
- Department: Collines Department
- Commune: Savalou

Abeokouta is a village in western Benin. It is located in Savalou commune in the Collines Department.

Nearby towns and villages include Doume (2.2 nm), Abala (1.4 nm), Akoumokoumo (4.0 nm), Loukou (4.4 nm), Amou (6.3 nm), Agan (1.0 nm), Ekpa (2.2 nm) and Ekpaogan (2.2 nm) .
