= Małoszyce, Silesian Voivodeship =

Małoszyce
- Village
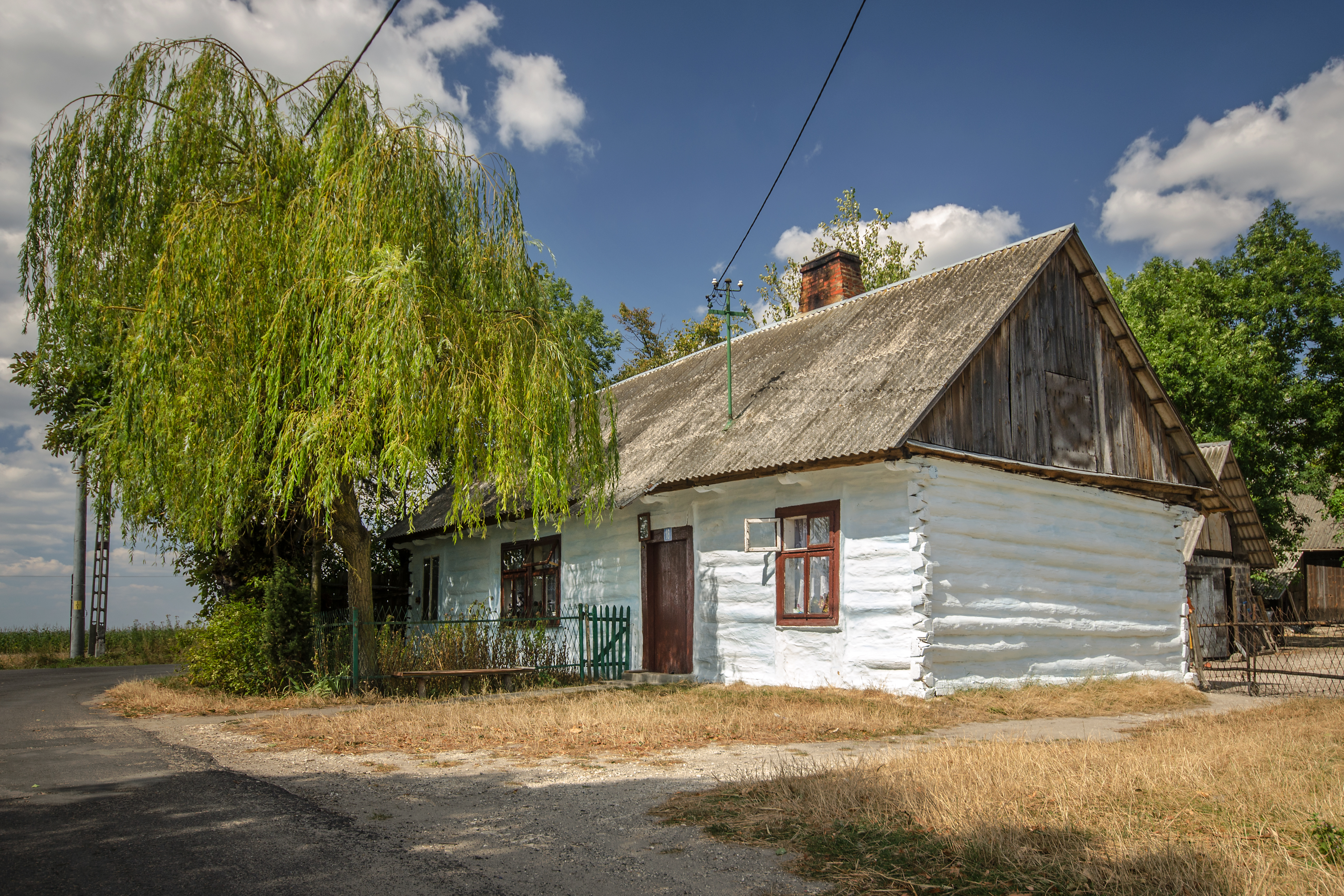

- Location within Poland
- Coordinates: 50°32′26″N 19°50′14″E
- Country: Poland
- Voivodeship: Silesian
- County: Zawiercie
- Gmina: Żarnowiec

Małoszyce [mawɔˈʂɨt͡sɛ] is a village in the administrative district of Gmina Żarnowiec, within Zawiercie County, Silesian Voivodeship, in southern Poland.
