= Koryczany =

- Village
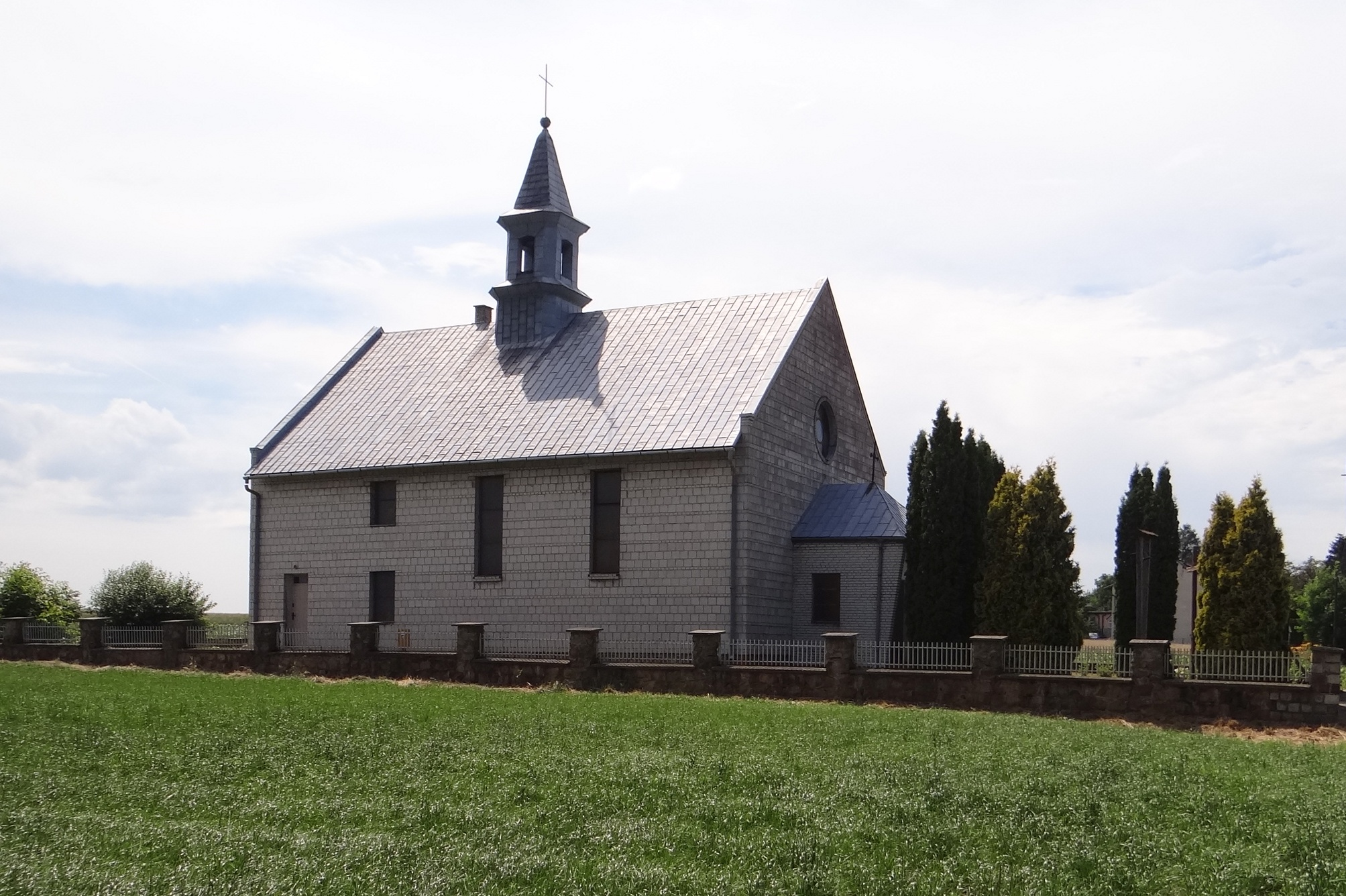
- Catholic church

- Location within Poland
- Coordinates: 50°29′23″N 19°56′4″E
- Country: Poland
- Voivodeship: Silesian
- County: Zawiercie
- Gmina: Żarnowiec

Koryczany [kɔrɨˈt͡ʂanɨ] is a village in the administrative district of Gmina Żarnowiec, within Zawiercie County, Silesian Voivodeship, in southern Poland.
