= Chlina Dolna =

- Village
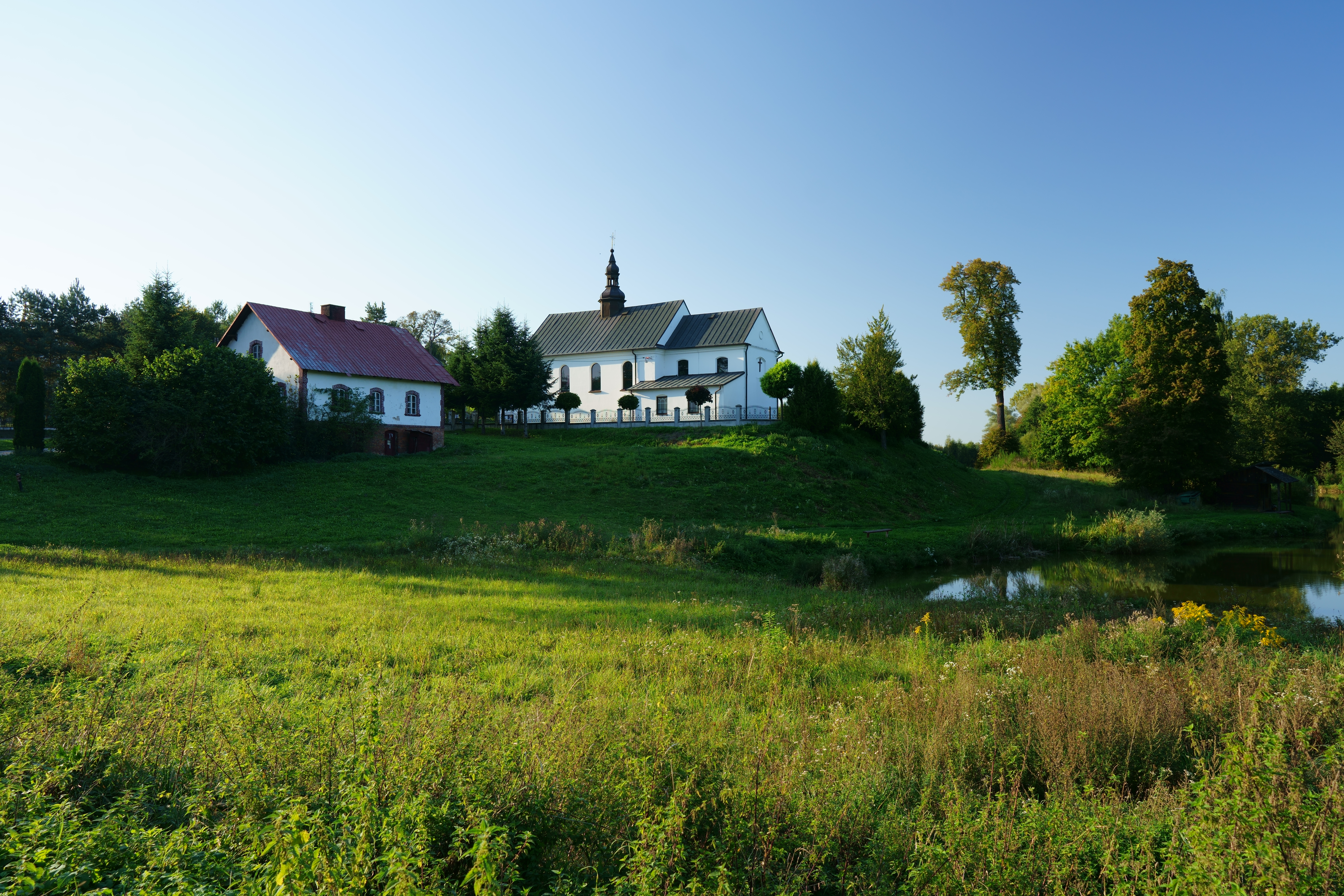

- Location within Poland
- Coordinates: 50°26′40″N 19°49′1″E
- Country: Poland
- Voivodeship: Silesian
- County: Zawiercie
- Gmina: Żarnowiec

Chlina Dolna [ˈxlina ˈdɔlna] is a village in the administrative district of Gmina Żarnowiec, within Zawiercie County, Silesian Voivodeship, in southern Poland.
