= Gmina Żarnowiec =

Gmina Żarnowiec Żarnowiec Commune
- Gmina
- Coat of arms
- Interactive map of Gmina Żarnowiec
- Coordinates (Żarnowiec): 50°29′4″N 19°51′47″E
- Country: Poland
- Voivodeship: Silesian
- County: Zawiercie
- Seat: Żarnowiec

Area
  - Total: 124.77 km^{2} (48.17 sq mi)

Population (2019-06-30)
  - Total: 4,627
  - Density: 37.08/km^{2} (96.05/sq mi)

Gmina Żarnowiec is a rural gmina (administrative district) in Zawiercie County, Silesian Voivodeship, in southern Poland. Its seat is the village of Żarnowiec, which lies approximately 32 kilometres (20 mi) east of Zawiercie and 67 km (42 mi) north-east of the regional capital Katowice.

The gmina covers an area of 124.77 square kilometres (48.2 sq mi), and as of 2019 its total population is 4,627.

== Villages ==
Gmina Żarnowiec contains the villages and settlements of Brzeziny, Chlina, Chlina Dolna, Jeziorowice, Koryczany, Łany Małe, Łany Średnie, Łany Wielkie, Małoszyce, Ostra Górka, Otola, Otola Mała, Udórz, Wola Libertowska, Zabrodzie, Zamiechówka and Żarnowiec.

== Neighbouring gminas ==
Gmina Żarnowiec is bordered by the gminas of Charsznica, Kozłów, Pilica, Sędziszów, Słupia, Szczekociny and Wolbrom.
