= Jamir (surname) =

Jamir is an Ao Naga surname. Notable people with the surname include:

- Imnainla Jamir (born 2002), Indian guitarist
- Merenka Jamir (born 1998), Indian cricketer
- Metsubo Jamir, Indian politician
- Piyong Temjen Jamir (1948–2018), Hindu scholar
- S.C. Jamir (born 1931), Indian politician
- Temjentoshi Jamir (born 1985), Indian cricketer

== See also ==
- List of Naga surnames
