= Koso (surname) =

Koso is a surname with multiple origins.

== Other derivations ==
People with the family name Koso, but unrelated to the Naga root above, include:

- Kazuhiro Koso (b. 1959), Japanese football player
- Enver Koso (b. 1956), Bosnian handball player

== See also ==
- Koso (disambiguation) (other meanings)
