= Zhimomi =

Zhimomi is a Sümi Naga surname. Notable people with the surname include:

- Hokaito Zhimomi, cricketer
- Inakato Zhimomi, cricketer
- Jacob Zhimomi, politician
- H. Khekiho Zhimomi, politician
- Vino Zhimomi, cricketer

== See also ==
- List of Naga surnames
