= Apaki =

- Location in Benin
- Coordinates: 8°5′N 1°38′E
- Country: Benin
- Department: Collines Department
- Commune: Savalou

Apaki is a village in western Benin near the Togolese border. It is located in Savalou commune in the Collines Department.

Nearby towns and villages include Agbanho (1.0 nm), Kotongbo (1.4 nm), Lekpa (2.0 nm), Alekpo (3.6 nm), Pepelou (3.6 nm), Ekpa (1.0 nm) and Takete (1.4 nm).
