= Zabrodzie, Silesian Voivodeship =

Zabrodzie
- Village
- Location within Poland
- Coordinates: 50°29′11″N 19°52′24″E
- Country: Poland
- Voivodeship: Silesian
- County: Zawiercie
- Gmina: Żarnowiec

Zabrodzie [zaˈbrɔd͡ʑɛ] is a village in the administrative district of Gmina Żarnowiec, within Zawiercie County, Silesian Voivodeship, in southern Poland.
