= Amou, Benin =

Amou
- Location in Benin
- Coordinates: 8°4′N 1°47′E
- Country: Benin
- Department: Collines Department
- Commune: Savalou
- Postal code: 6.3 nautical miles (11.7 km)

Amou is a village in western Benin. It is located in Savalou commune in the Collines Department. Prior to 1999 Amou was part of the former Zou Province.

Nearby towns and villages include Loukou 8.3 km (4.5 nmi), Soedji 9.3 km (5 nmi), Adanhoue 9.4 km (5.1 nmi), Abeokouta 11.7 km (6.3 nmi), 11.7 km (6.3 nmi), Konfouda 11.7 km (6.3 nmi), Akoumokoumo 11.7 km (6.3 nmi), Alekpo 12.4 km (6.7 nmi), Pepelou 12.4 km (6.7 nmi), Okpedie 19.1 km (10.3 nmi), and Kafingbe 13.3 km (7.2 nmi).
