= Jeziorowice =

- Village
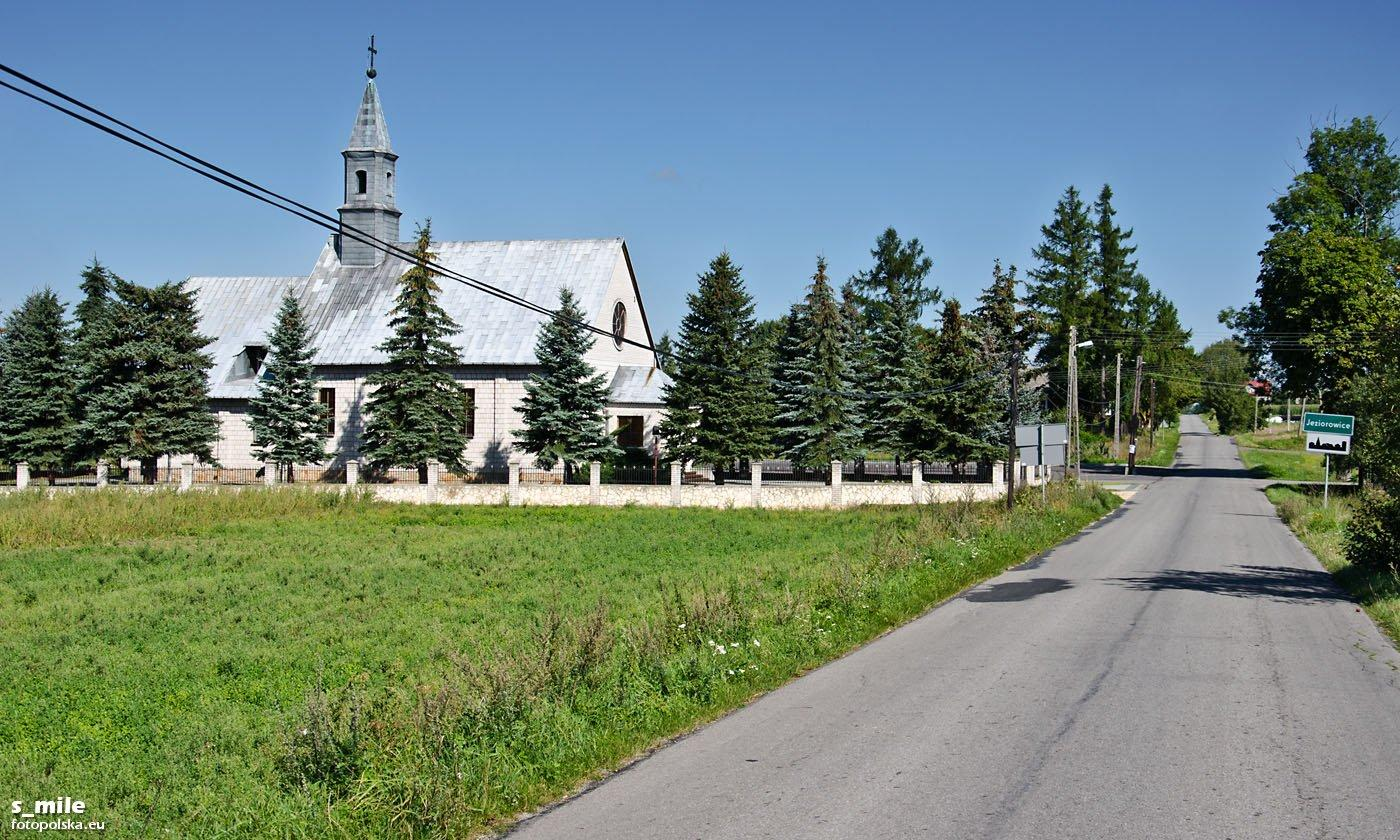

- Location within Poland
- Coordinates: 50°32′N 19°47′E
- Country: Poland
- Voivodeship: Silesian
- County: Zawiercie
- Gmina: Żarnowiec
- Population: 230

Jeziorowice [jɛʑɔrɔˈvit͡sɛ] is a village in the administrative district of Gmina Żarnowiec, within Zawiercie County, Silesian Voivodeship, in southern Poland.
