= Koso =

Koso may refer to:

- A native American tribe also known as Timbisha
- Koso (drink), Japanese fermented drink brand
- Koso (Angami surname), an Angami Naga surname
- Koso (surname)
- KOSO, a radio station (92.9 FM) licensed to Patterson, California
