= List of Naga surnames =

The following is a list of Naga surnames. The Nagas comprise a number of distinct ethnic groups, including the Angami, Ao, Sümi, Lotha, Tangkhul and others, each with its own naming practices. In many cases, these surnames correspond to clan names or lineage groups rather than standardized hereditary surnames.

== Angami ==
=== Northern Angami ===
- Liezietsu

=== Southern Angami ===
- Koso
- Yhoshü

== Ao ==
- Jamir
- Longkümer

== Chakhesang ==
=== Khezha/Kuzhami ===
- Kenye

== Lotha ==
- Kikon

== Sümi ==
- Chishi
- Zhimomi

== Tangkhul ==
- Khathing
- Shaiza

== See also ==
- Naga people
- List of Naga people
