= Wola Libertowska =

- Village
- Location within Poland
- Coordinates: 50°29′N 19°49′E
- Country: Poland
- Voivodeship: Silesian
- County: Zawiercie
- Gmina: Żarnowiec

Wola Libertowska [ˈvɔla libɛrˈtɔfska] is a village in the administrative district of Gmina Żarnowiec, within Zawiercie County, Silesian Voivodeship, in southern Poland.
