= Łany Średnie =

Lany Srednie
- Village
- Location within Poland
- Coordinates: 50°30′13″N 19°53′42″E
- Country: Poland
- Voivodeship: Silesian
- County: Zawiercie
- Gmina: Żarnowiec
- Population: 330

Łany Średnie [ˈwanɨ ˈɕrɛdɲɛ] is a village in the administrative district of Gmina Żarnowiec, within Zawiercie County, Silesian Voivodeship, in southern Poland.
