= Kenye =

Kenye is a Chakhesang people surname. Notable people with the surname include:

- Melhite Kenye (1922–2022), Indian pastor and agriculturist
- K. G. Kenye (b. 1960), Indian politician

== See also ==
- List of Naga surnames
