= Chishi =

Chishi is a surname attributed to the Sumi tribe from Nagaland, India

Notable people with the surname include:

- Isak Chishi Swu (1929 to 2016), chairman of the Nationalist Socialist Council of Nagaland(NSCN)
- K. L. Chishi (born 1944), Indian politician
- Nagaho Chishi (born 1997), Indian cricketer
- Toni Chishi (born 1995), Indian cricketer

== See also ==
- List of Naga surnames
