= Central University of Jharkhand =

University in Ranchi, India

- Seal of Central University of Jharkhand
- Motto: Knowledge to Wisdom
- Type: Central Research University
- Established: 2009; 15 years ago
- Founders: Parliamentary Act, 2009, Government of India
- Accreditation: NAAC with Grade 'A+'
- Affiliations: UGC, AICTE, BCI, ICSSR, PCI, NCTE
- Endowment: 11,252.56 Cr
- Chancellor: Jai Prakash Lal
- Vice-Chancellor: Sarang Medhekar (acting)
- Visitor: President of India
- Academic staff: 221
- Administrative staff: 57
- Undergraduates: 1,560
- Postgraduates: 1,113
- Doctoral students: 208
- Location: Ranchi, Jharkhand, 822113, India; 23°26′21″N 85°15′12″E
- Campus: Brambe campus: 45 acres (Old) Manatu campus: 670 acres (New); Semi Urban
- Language: English and Hindi
- Website: www.cuj.ac.in

The Central University of Jharkhand (CUJ) is a research intensive Central University located in Ranchi, Jharkhand, India. It was established in 2009 as per the Parliament of India and is recognized as a Central University by the University Grants Commission. The NAAC has accredited the university with 'A+' grade in 2025.

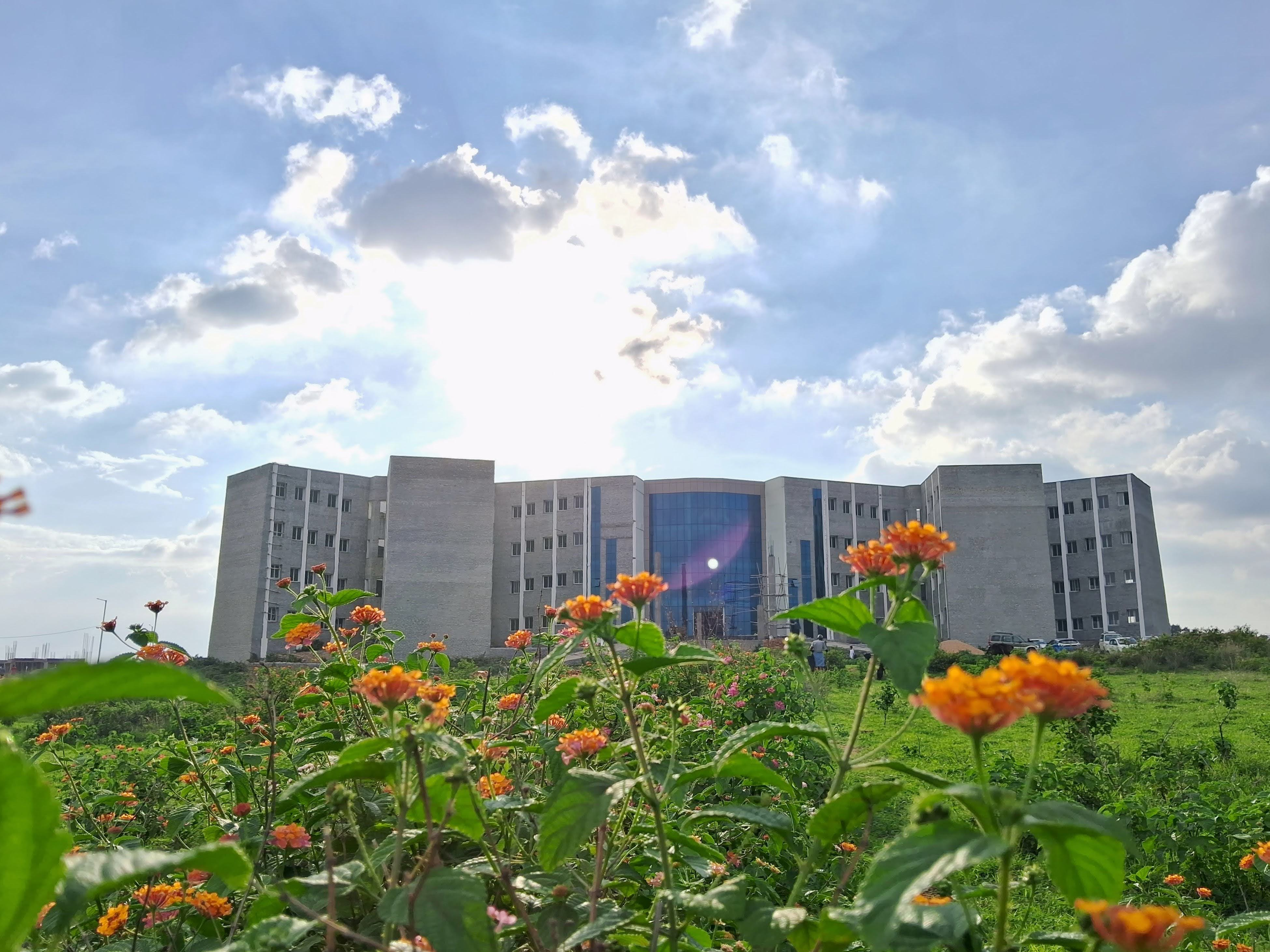
Science Building of Central University of Jharkhand, Ranchi

== History ==
CUJ was established in 2009 under the first schedule of the Central Universities Act, 2009. The first and founding Vice Chancellor (VC), Darlando Khathing, was appointed 1 March 2009. Consequent upon culmination of his tenure in March 2014, he was replaced by acting vice chancellor A.N. Misra. Prof. Misra served as acting VC until the appointment of Nand Kumar Yadav Indu as permanent VC in August 2015. On completion of his term, Prof. Ratan Kumar Dey served as the acting VC for almost a year. Prof. Kshiti Bhusan Das headed the university until February 2026. The current acting VC is Prof. Sarang Medhekar.

== Campuses ==
The university has two operational campuses (temporary campus and permanent campus).

- The Brambe campus (temporary) is a 45-acre transit campus located about 25 km from the heart of Ranchi city. It includes 70 independent class rooms and teaching labs, a 450-seat auditorium, research labs for sciences, engineering workshops and computer lab. The university provides on-campus accommodation to students (total capacity 1000 boys and girls in separate hostels).
- The Cheri-Manatu campus (permanent) is a 510-acre campus located 17 km from the epicenter of Ranchi city. Its infrastructure is developing rapidly. The administrative activities, undergraduate classes, and non-laboratory based departments are operational from this campus. Separate hostel for boys/girls and library are also located in this campus.

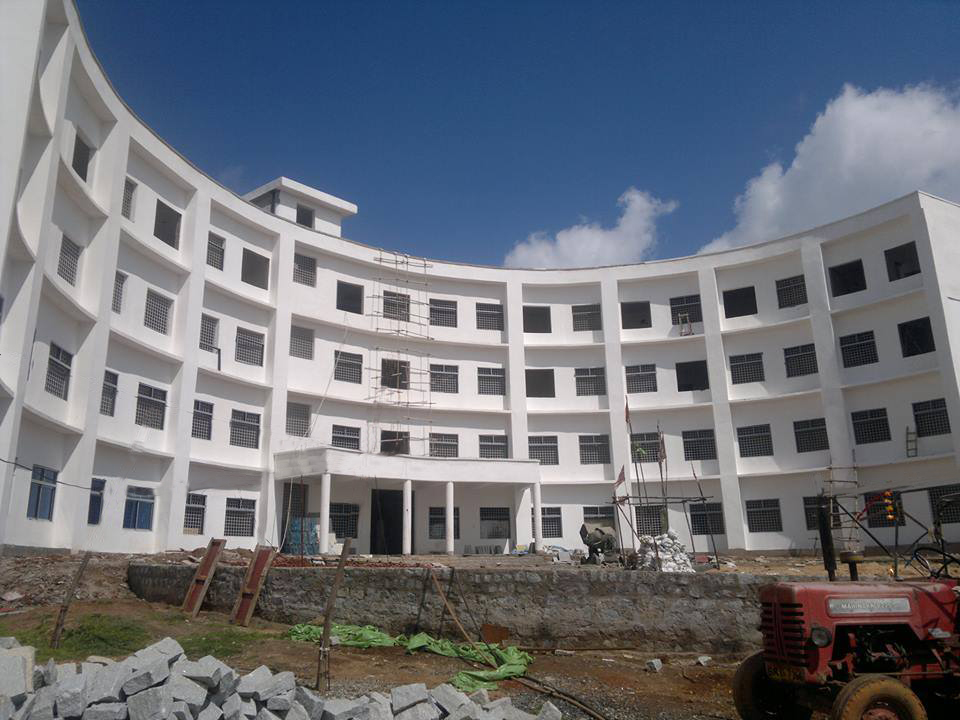
Administrative Building at Cheri-Manatu Campus

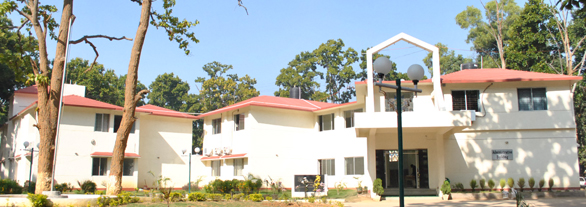
Administrative Building at Brambe Campus

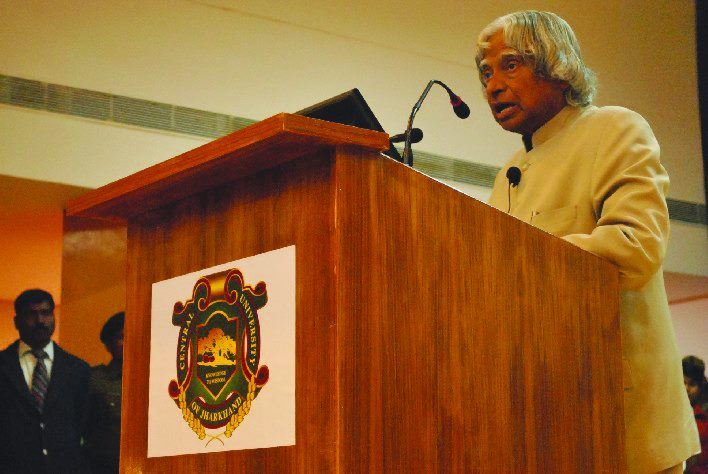
Former President Dr. Abdul Kalam at CUJ

== Academics in CUJ ==
=== Schools and Departments ===
School of Social Sciences

- Department of International Relations
- Department of Political Science and Public Administration
- Department of Economics and Development Studies

School of Mass Communication and Media Technologies

- Department of Mass Communication

School of Natural Sciences

- Department of Chemistry
- Department of Physics
- Department of Life Sciences
- Department of Mathematics
- Department of Statistics

School of Languages

- Department of English Studies
- Department of Hindi
- Department of Far East Languages (Korean, Chinese, Tibetan)

School of Engineering and Technology

- Department of Metallurgical and Material Engineering
- Department of Energy Engineering
- Centre for Excellence-Green and Efficient Energy Technology (CoE-GEET)
- Department of Civil Engineering
- Department of Computer Science and Engineering

School for the Study of Culture

- Department of Anthropology and Tribal Studies
  - Centre for Indigenous Knowledge and Sustainable Development (CIKSD)
- Department of Performing Arts

School of Natural Resource Management

- Department of Environmental Sciences
  - Centre for Environment, Society and Governance for Sustainable Development (CESGSD)
- Department of Geo-informatics
- Department of Geography

School of Management Sciences

- Department of Business Administration
- Department of Commerce and Financial Studies

School of Education

- Department of Education

=== Admission and Classes ===
Except a few departments, undergraduate, post-graduate and doctoral programs are offered by almost all academic units of the university. Admission to undergraduate and post-graduate programmes is done through Common University Entrance Test (CUET) conducted by National Testing Agency (NTA), whereas for doctoral degree, it is based either on UGC/CSIR NET examination or test conducted by University, after which a mandatory interview in convened. The university also offers part-time Ph.D. programme. The classes are operational at both the campuses as per location of the academic department.

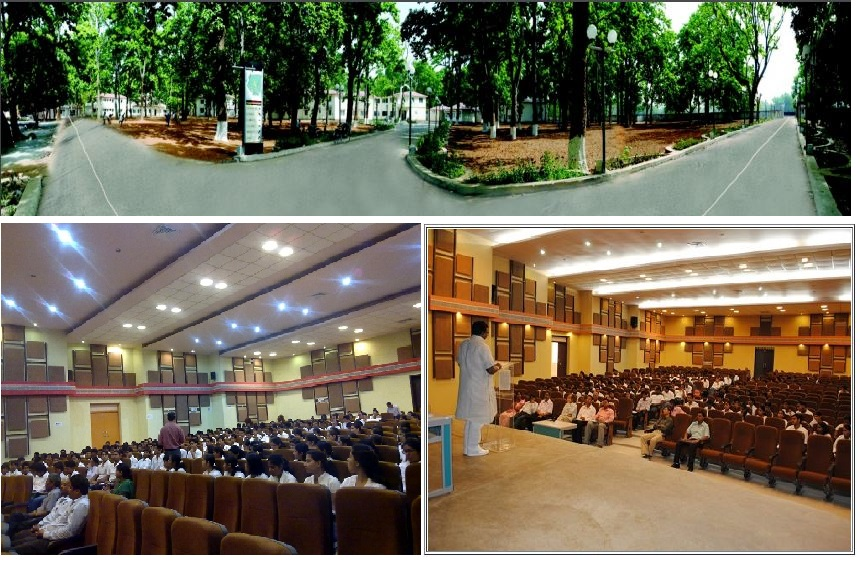
Inner View of Temporary Campus and University Auditorium.
