= Yoshu =

Yoshu may refer to:

- Yōshū (雍州)
  - Yōshū, another name for Yamashiro Province.
  - Yongzhou, a province in ancient China.
- Yōshū (揚州)
  - The Japanese spelling of Yangzhou, a city in Jiangsu Province.
- Yoshū (予州)
  - Yoshū, another name for Iyo Province.
