= Chlina =

- Village
- Location within Poland
- Coordinates: 50°27′N 19°50′E
- Country: Poland
- Voivodeship: Silesian
- County: Zawiercie
- Gmina: Żarnowiec
- Elevation: 325 m (1,066 ft)
- Population: 820
- Website: www.chlina.cba.pl

Chlina [ˈxlina] is a village in the administrative district of Gmina Żarnowiec, within Zawiercie County, Silesian Voivodeship, in southern Poland.
