= Liezietsu =

Liezietsu is an Angami Naga surname. Notable people with the surname include:

- Khriehu Liezietsu, Indian politician
- Shürhozelie Liezietsu (born 1936), Indian politician

== See also ==
- List of Naga surnames
