= Łany Wielkie, Zawiercie County =

Łany Wielkie
- Village
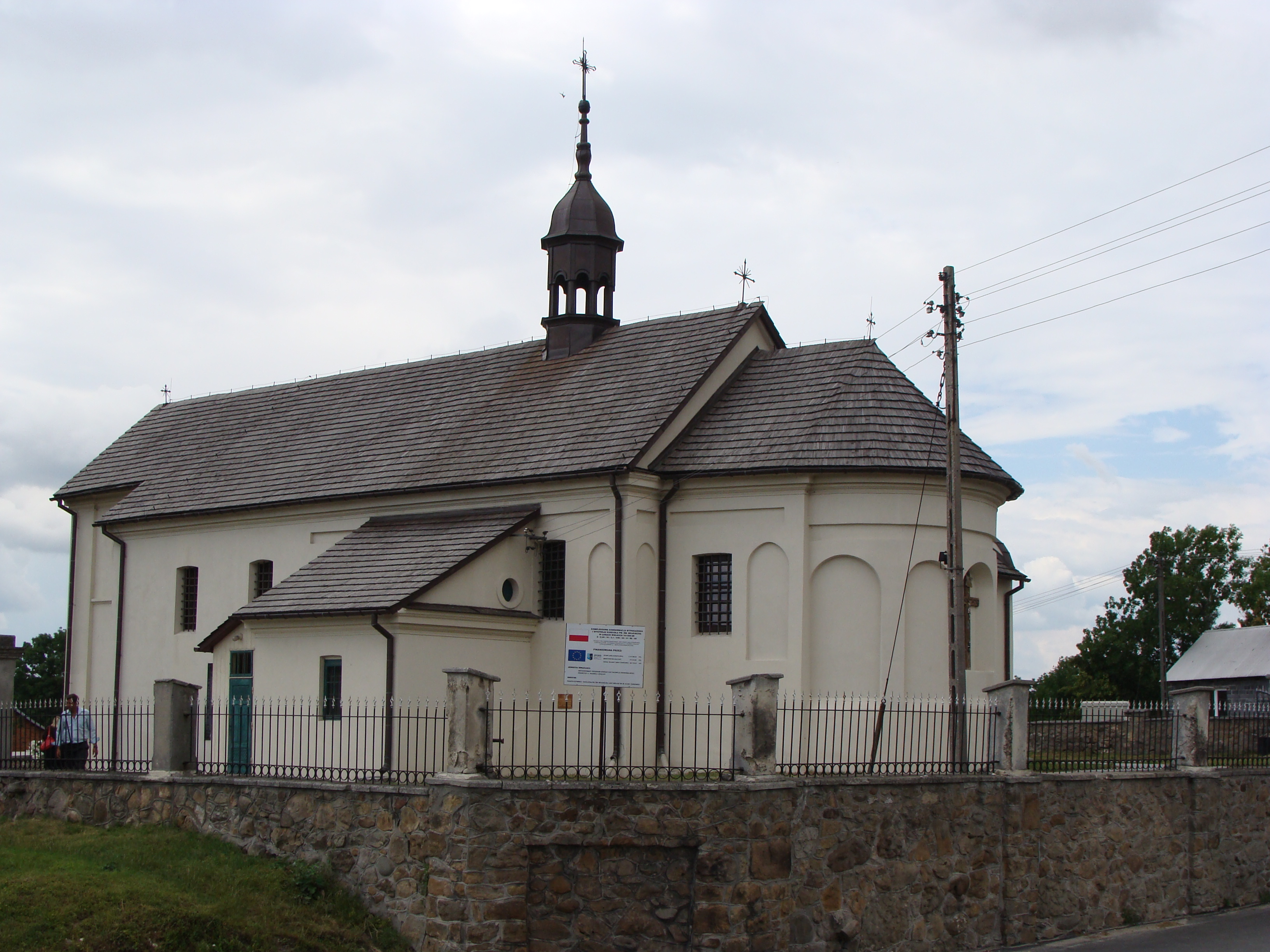
- Saint Wojciech Church

- Location within Poland
- Coordinates: 50°30′30″N 19°50′58″E
- Country: Poland
- Voivodeship: Silesian
- County: Zawiercie
- Gmina: Żarnowiec

Łany Wielkie [ˈwanɨ ˈvjɛlkʲɛ] is a village in the administrative district of Gmina Żarnowiec, within Zawiercie County, Silesian Voivodeship, in southern Poland.
