= Agoua =

Coordinates: 8°18′N 1°58′E

- Arrondissement and town
- Agoua (Benin)
- Country: Benin
- Department: Collines Department
- Commune: Bantè

Population (2002)
  - Total: 6,276
- Time zone: UTC+1 (WAT)

Agoua is a town and arrondissement in the Collines Department of Benin. It is an administrative division under the jurisdiction of the commune of Bantè. According to the population census conducted by the Institut National de la Statistique Benin on February 15, 2002, the arrondissement had a total population of 6276.
