= Darlando T. Khathing =

Indian academic

Vice chancellor of North East Christian University
- Incumbent
- Assumed office 2018

Vice chancellor of Central University of Jharkhand
- In office 2009–2014
- Succeeded by: Prof. A N Mishra

Personal details
- Education: St Stephen's College, Delhi and Bose Institute

Dr. Darlando Thanmi Khathing is the present Vice Chancellor of North East Christian University. He was also the first Vice Chancellor of Central University of Jharkhand.

== Career ==
Khathing is a retired Professor of Physics at the North-Eastern Hill University. From 2009 to 2014, Khathing served as the Vice-Chancellor of the Central University of Jharkhand.

== Awards ==
- Conferred Honorary D. Sc by USTM
