= Gouka, Benin =

Coordinates: 8°08′N 1°58′E

Gouka
- Arrondissement and town
- Interactive map of Gouka
- Country: Benin
- Department: Collines Department
- Commune: Bantè

Population (2002)
  - Total: 13,765
- Time zone: UTC+1 (WAT)

Gouka is a town and arrondissement in the Collines Department of Benin. It is an administrative division under the jurisdiction of the commune of Bantè. According to the population census conducted by the Institut National de la Statistique Benin back in 2006, the arrondissement had a total population of 16.070.
