= Bantè =

- Commune
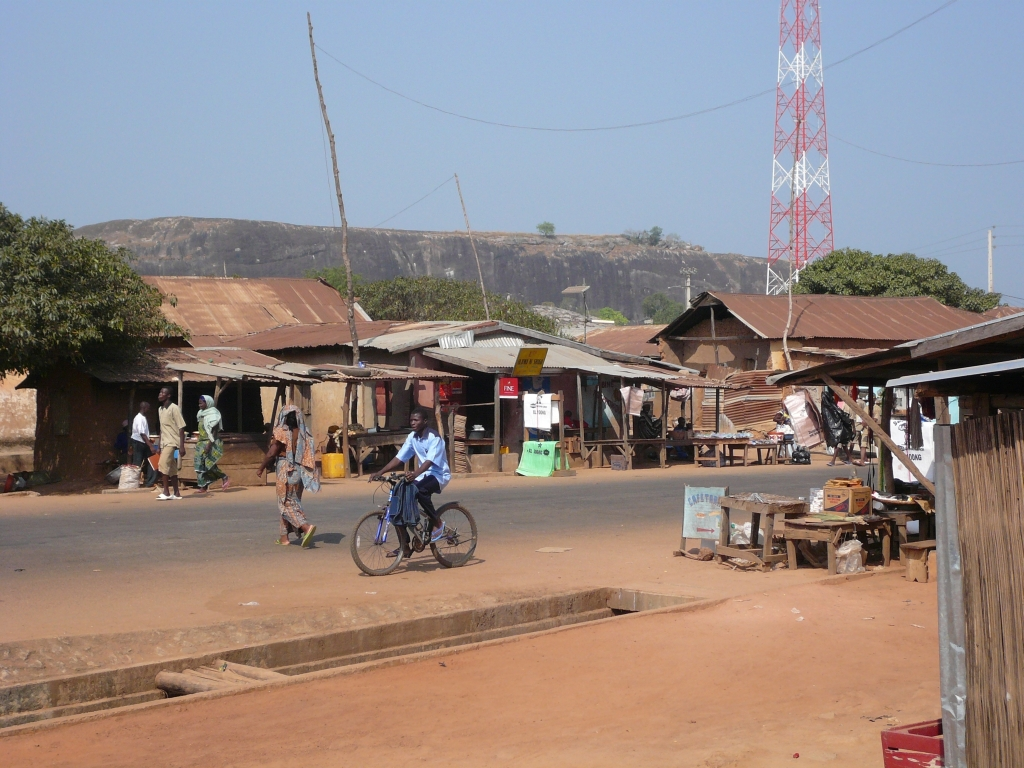

- Location in Benin
- Coordinates: 8°25′N 1°53′E
- Country: Benin
- Department: Collines Department
- Commune: Bantè

Government
  - Type: no

Area
  - Total: 2,695 km^{2} (1,041 sq mi)

Population (2013)
  - Total: 106,945

Bantè [bɑ̃.tɛ] is a town, arrondissement, and commune in western Benin. It is located in the former Zou Province of which since 1999 is part of the Collines Department. The commune covers an area of 2695 square kilometres and as of 2013 had a population of 106,945 people. The majority of the population is ethnically Nago specifically of the Isha subgroup, who themselves are a subgroup of the Yoruba. It is famous for the art exhibition Nago Hunters of the Bante Kingdom by Jean-Dominique Burton.

== Towns and villages ==
Settlements in the commune of Bantè include:

- Abidzi

== Arrondissements ==
The nine Arrondissements in the commune of Bantè are:

- Agoua
- Akpassi
- Atokoligbe
- Bante
- Bobè
- Gouka
- Koko
- Lougba
- Pira

== Notable people ==
- Cudjoe Lewis, the third to last known survivor of the Atlantic slave trade between Africa and the United States, was born in Bantè in 1841.
