= Kikon =

Kikon is a Lotha Naga surname. Notable people with the surname include:

- Dolly Kikon (born 1975), Indian anthropologist
- Mmhonlümo Kikon (born 1978), Indian politician
- Silas Kikon (1956–2016), Naga singer and composer

== See also ==
- List of Naga surnames
