= Ilara =

Ilara may refer to:

- Ilara-Mokin, a town in Ondo State, Nigeria.
- Ilara-Ogudo Yewa, a town in Ogun State, Nigeria
- The Institute for Linguistic Heritage and Diversity of the École pratique des hautes études
