= Gilbert Oluwatosin Jesse =

Nigerian pastor (1937–2003)

Gilbert Oluwatosin Jesse (17 May 1937 – 7 October 2003) was a factional Pastor and Spiritual Head of the Celestial Church of Christ (CCC) from 30 December 2002 until his death. He succeeded Philip Hunsu Ajose, who had died on 2 March 2001. There was a dispute over his leadership, with the International Headquarters of the church declaring that the Reverend Emmanuel Oschoffa, son of the church founder Samuel Oshoffa, was the leader. Following Jesse's death, his faction declared that Superior Evangelist Paul Suru Maforikan was the new spiritual leader of the church.

== Early years ==
Jesse was born on 17 May 1937 in Mahin, Ilaje – Ese Odo Local Government of Ondo State, Nigeria. He was educated at St Paul's Catholic Primary School, Ebute-Metta, Lagos, then Lagos City College, Yaba, Lagos graduating with his West African School Certificate in 1958. He then obtained a job as Clerical Officer at the Prime Ministers Office, Race Course, Lagos State, and then with the Federal Ministry of Establishment. Jesse retired in 1972 and started work in electronic sales and then vehicle sales.

== Church career ==
Jesse joined the Celestial Church Of Christ in 1953 at National Headquarters, Makoko, Yaba, Lagos State. In 1969, he established a parish in Ikorodu Road, Fadeyi, which he led until 1979. In 1975 he became a full-time worker with the Celestial Church Of Christ. In 1979 he set up the Celestial Church Of Christ in Ojota Parish 1. In 1988 he was appointed Most Senior Evangelist, and was posted as Ogun State Evangelist. In 1990 he was transferred back to Lagos where he was given charge of the Surulere and Ijeshatedo Districts and of the Shepherd Celestial Church Of Christ, Olajuwon Tejuosho Parish.

Jesse was appointed Chairman of the International Revival Committee, and then became Reverend and Superior Evangelist, Head of Celestial Church Of Christ, Nigeria Diocese. On 30 December 2002 he was appointed Pastor and Spiritual Head of the Celestial Church Of Christ by the CCC World Council Of Pastor's Representatives. The announcement was made the next day a press briefing at the CCC Tejuosho Parish in Lagos, which was attended by all the senior members of the Celestial Church Of Christ. This followed after Emmanuel Oschoffa, senior evangelist and son of the founding pastor S.B.J. Oschoffa was appointed the church's worldwide leader on 25 December 2002 by the board of trustees. The leader of the CCC's Shepherds Council, which had appointed Jesse, stated that this council's decision superseded all other appointments

Jesse died on 7 October 2003 after less than a year in office. Even in death, controversy continued, with members of the Burial Committee disagreeing over which company should handle his funeral.
