= Celestial City, Imeko =

Coordinates: 7.452348°N 2.839408°E

- Location within Nigeria
- Location: Imeko, Ogun State
- Country: Nigeria
- Denomination: Celestial Church of Christ

History
- Founded: 1985
- Founder: Samuel Oshoffa

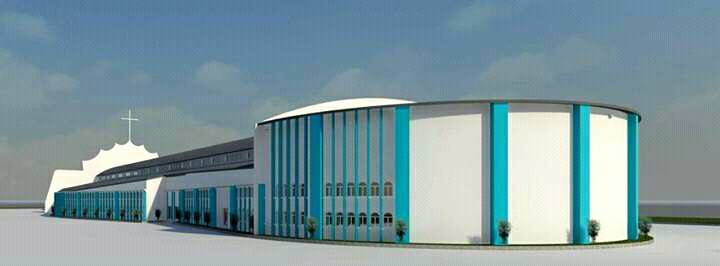
Rear view of the Celestial City Auditorium

Celestial City, Imeko, is the Holy City of the Celestial Church of Christ (CCC). It is located in the Imeko Afon Local Government Area of Ogun State, Nigeria, very close to the border with Benin. Celestial City is known as "Jerusalem" by the Celestians. The city has potential as a tourist location.

== Origins ==
Imeko is a small, spread out village in a hilly region of Ogun State a few kilometers from the Benin border. The vegetation is a mixture of savannah belt and sparse forest suitable for cattle raising. Most people are engaged in farming, with tomatoes and cassava being the most important crops. Imeko is the home town of the mother of the Prophet "Papa" Samuel Oshoffa, who founded the Celestial Church of Christ in 1947 in Dahomey (now Benin), moving to Nigeria in 1979.

In 1973, a visionary, Pa Muri Adoye told Oshoffa of a visitation by a troop of angels who had said the Celestial City must be built at Imeko in a place called Igbo-Ifa, home of the traditional Yoruba deity Orunmila. Mecca would be closed and Jerusalem would move to Imeko. This confirmed messages the Prophet said he had received from Christ. Oshoffa initiated construction of the Celestial City in 1983.

Oshoffa had directed that if he died in Nigeria he should be buried near his mother on family land at Imeko, and his burial ground be treated as holy ground and a place of pilgrimage. If he were to die in Dahomey he was to be buried at Seme in his home town of Porto-Novo. Oshoffa died in Lagos, Nigeria, on 10 September 1985, a few days after surviving a car crash. He was buried according to his wishes at Celestial City on 19 October 1985 with great ceremony. He left behind 34 wives and 150 children. The Porto-Novo congregation was angry at the choice of burial place, and there were rumors of plans to remove the body to Porto-Novo. The Nigerian police took special precautions to prevent this happening.

== Ceremonies ==
Alexander Abiodun Adebayo Bada was proclaimed the second Pastor of the church on 17 December 1985, and his appointment was ratified by the general congregation at their annual Christmas festival and convocation at Imeko on 25 December 1985. After a two-year waiting period, Bada was enthroned as Pastor at Celestial City on 24 December 1987.

Imeko became a place of pilgrimage at Christmas for thousands of Celestial Christians from Nigeria, from other parts of West Africa and from more distant places including London and the United States, although most of the Benin congregation gather in Seme, Porto-Novo. The journey to Imeko is expensive and may be difficult to accomplish. Travelers from Abidjan in Côte d'Ivoire, for example, face a long coach ride costing the equivalent of a month's minimum wages. The traveler must pay visa fees, informal fees at border crossings, and anointment fees on arrival. But an important part of the pilgrimage is the opportunity to be anointed, which can only be done by the Pastor of the church, and usually only at Imeko.

When Pastor Bada died, he was buried at Celestial City on the 29th day of September 2000. Ogun State Governor Olusegun Osoba represented President Olusegun Obasanjo at the funeral ceremony. There had been a legal challenge to the burial of Bada close to the Oshoffa's tomb, with Rev. Edward Olayinola Oladokun saying that the burial would erode Oshoffa's intentions for Celestial City to become a pilgrimage centre. The 3rd pastor, Philip Hunsu Ajose, was appointed the new leader at a meeting on 24 December 2000 at Celestial City. However, Ajose soon became terminally ill, and died on 2 March 2001. He was buried on 30 March 2001 at the conference center at Celestial City.

Ajose's succession was disputed, and by October 2003, the church had split into four factions. One was led by the founder's son Emmanuel Oshoffa, chosen by the board of trustees; one by Paul Suru Maforikan, chosen by the council of superiors of CCC Worldwide; one by Superior Evangelist Agbaosi of Benin; and one by Superior Evangelist Josiah Kayode Owudunni. The schism had still not been resolved as of April 2010, with six claimants to be pastor, although the Supreme Court had declared that nobody could call himself Pastor of the CCC until the church had a new constitution.

== Buildings ==
Plans to build a cathedral at the National Headquarters, Makoko, had been initiated and approved by the founder in 1973, but were put on hold when planning began for Celestial City. The original plan, revealed in a celestial vision, was for Celestial City to include a huge cathedral, a prayer garden, conference hall, residence for the pastor, inns for each diocese and so on. Later, plans were made to build an impressive mausoleum for the prophet. Work began, foundations were laid and some pillars erected, but a 2002 report said that the Celestial City was still essentially a building site. A market has sprung up to sell religious goods such as candles and vestments, as well as food and drink. With no formal facilities available, the pilgrims must camp wherever they can. When the pilgrims leave, the site becomes virtually deserted.

Senior Prophetess Rosaline Bola Sodeinde, known as the "spiritual daughter" of the church founder, was reported to have been raising funds in 1995 for the purpose of building a basilica at Celestial City. During his short tenure in 2001, Pastor Ajose ordered that the seminary at Makoko, in the outskirts of Lagos, be transferred to Imeko. This was ratified by the board of trustees. He also ordained that any Pastor who succeeded him should live at Imeko. At Ajose's burial, youths carried placards reading "The emerging pastor must stay in Imeko", "Complete the Celestial city project" and "Don't change Papa Oshoffa's plan for Imeko". One of the youth leaders said that the people of the town wanted church elders to develop Celestial City faster, making it more than just a burial ground. However, despite plans for more construction at the site, little was done. In a statement dated 27 January 2009, Evangelist (Prophet) Samuel Olumuyiwa Oshodi said, "All projects in the Celestial City, Imeko ... have become major embarrassment to right thinking Celestians – just because we lack Godly leadership".

== Climate ==
In Imeko, the wet season is overcast, the dry season is partly cloudy, and it is hot and oppressive year round. Over the course of the year, the temperature typically varies from 71 °F (22 °C) to 93 °F (34 °C) and is rarely below 65 °F (18 °C) or above 96 °F (36 °C). Based on the beach/pool score, the best time of year to visit Imeko for hot-weather activities is from early December to late January.

=== Rainfall ===
To show variation within the months and not just the monthly totals, we show the rainfall accumulated over a sliding 31-day period centered around each day of the year. Imeko experiences extreme seasonal variation in monthly rainfall. The rainy period of the year lasts for 9.6 months, from 6 February to 23 November, with a sliding 31-day rainfall of at least 0.5 inches. The month with the most rain in Imeko is September, with an average rainfall of 8.2 inches. The rainless period of the year lasts for 2.4 months, from 23 November to 6 February. The month with the least rain in Imeko is January, with an average rainfall of 0.2 inches.

=== Cloud ===
In Imeko, the average percentage of the sky covered by clouds varies significantly during the annual cycle of seasons. The clearer part of the year in Imeko begins around 8 November and lasts for 3.1 months, ending around 11 February. The clearest month of the year in Imeko is December, during which on average the sky is clear, mostly clear, or partly cloudy 54% of the time. The cloudier part of the year begins around 11 February and lasts for 8.9 months, ending around 8 November. The cloudiest month of the year in Imeko is April, during which on average the sky is overcast or mostly cloudy 82% of the time.
