= Amedzofe =

Amedzofe may refer to:

- Amedzofe, Ghana, a settlement
- Amedzofe (history), one of the names for Ketu in Ewe history
