= Ediémou Blin Jacob =

Ivorian pastor (1945–2026)

- Born: 5 November 1945; Grand-Bassam, Ivory Coast, French West Africa
- Died: 19 October 2026 (aged 80); Abidjan, Ivory Coast
- Occupation: Pastor
- Organization: Celestial Church of Christ

Ediémou Blin Jacob (5 November 1945 – 19 October 2026) was an Ivorian pastor, civil servant and football player who spent his life in the Celestial Church of Christ. He was goalkeeper for USC Bassam and worked in the government and civil service before converting to the Celestial Church, upon which he entered their priesthood. He was the first native Ivorian to be a priest in the Celestial Church of Christ, and headed the church in Côte d'Ivoire from 1984 to 2026.

== Early life and career ==
Blin Jacob was born on 5 November 1945 in Grand-Bassam. He was a high school schoolmate of Laurent Gbagbo. In the 1960s, he played as goalkeeper for USC Bassam, then one of the most prominent football clubs in the country. He recounted dressing in a luxury outfit when he was certain they were going to win and in regular sportswear if he believed they were going to lose. His skill was such that people believed he had magical powers, and the club brought in traditional priests to support him and other players in matches. At that time, he was already a devout Christian: he once missed blocking a goal because it was kicked while he was praying.

He subsequently went on to work as an auditor in telecommunications and become an aide at the Ministry of Commerce of Cote d'Ivoire. His intent was to become a priest in the Catholic Church: he became a sacristan and, reportedly, was personally contacted by Pope John Paul II, who told him to become a Catholic priest.

However, on a government trip to Lomé, he encountered members of the Celestial Church of Christ, based in Benin and Nigeria and then not well-respected in Cote d'Ivoire. A prophetess of the group reportedly told him "Enter in the service of God or you will die," and so he was directed to meet the leader, Samuel Oshoffa, in Benin, which he did in 1975. In August 1976, he officially became a member and priest of the church, quitting his government job and giving up his clothes and shoes for white robes. Just a few months later, he was officially ordained assistant evangelist and appointed to head the church in the Ivory Coast. He was the church's first Ivorian priest, and the last priest to have been a disciple of Oshoffa.

In the 1980s, the church continued to be not well-regarded, so he insisted on a debate with the Catholic Church and their bishop for the area, Paul Dacoury-Tabley of the Diocese of Grand-Bassam. After the debate, Cote d'Ivoire's president, Félix Houphouët-Boigny, granted the church governmental permission, and subsequently took to calling it "the church of Ediemou".

In the 2000s, a dispute arose over the true head of the church's branch in the Ivory Coast, as a schism had formed: a pastor, Zagadou Akéblé, sent his followers on a pilgrimage to Imeko Afon, Nigeria, where Oshoffa was buried, while Jacob and his followers went to the religion's other holy site Sèmè-Kpodji in Benin. However, in 2009, Jacob took measures to end the split: when he was called to meet President Laurent Gbagbo as the representative of the Celestial Church, he invited Akéblé and his ally Kanon Luc as well, and by July 2009, the split had somewhat cooled.

However, it continued: Jacob argued that the church should have only three main pastors, a leader each for Benin, Nigeria, and Cote d'Ivoire, and Akéblé would not be counted as one, but was using the name of the church despite that. Armed with a presidential ruling that he was in fact the leader and with Oshoffa's declaration, he took the case to court, where it dragged until 2022: that year, the Supreme Court of Cote d'Ivoire ruled that Jacob was in fact the legitimate head of the Celestial Church in Cote d'Ivoire. After the supreme court case, he was also head of the National Forum of Religious Denominations.

In 2024, he called for peaceful elections. In August 2025, the Church allegedly sought to dismiss him, but he maintained that he remained the head in Cote d'Ivoire. In August 2026, on the Celestial Church in Ivory Coast and his own 50th anniversary, he published his memoir, Destin tracé de l'homme aux pieds nus.

== Illness and death ==
In early October 2026, he was hospitalised due to illness, and internet rumours falsely alleged that he was dead. On 8 October, he gave a speech at his home in Abidjan, stating that everyone should "enter the end of the year in peace". He died on 19 October 2026, at the age of 80. Vagondo Diomande, the Interior Minister of Cote d'Ivoire, delivered condolences from the President to the church.
