= Ago-Oba =

Electoral ward in Abeokuta, Ogun State, Nigeria

Ago-Oba Camp of the Oba
- Electoral Ward / Community
- Camp of the Oba
- Location in Nigeria
- Coordinates: 7.15°N 3.35°E
- Country: Nigeria
- State: Ogun
- City: Abeokuta
- Local Government Area: Abeokuta South
- Elevation: 71.72 m (235.3 ft)
- Time zone: UTC+1 (WAT)

Ago-Oba is an electoral ward 13 in the city of Abeokuta, Ogun State, Nigeria. It is part of the Abeokuta South Local Government Area.

== Location ==
Ago Oba (Camp of the Oba) is a community in the Egba section of Abeokuta whose people claim to originate from the ancient Oba Kingdom. It is not clear whether Ago Oba was formed due to the migration of Egba people during the 19th century Yoruba wars, or whether the people arrived at an earlier time. The villages under the Oba Kingdom are as follows: Pakudi Village, Agbamaya Village, Lodan Village, Okuribido Village, Abule Tuntun Village, Olorunda Village, Ikeja Village, Omilende Village, Agbanikanda Village, Igboti Village and Akija Village, Oba-Aro village, Oba-Oluwo village, Seriki etc

The main economic activities are trading, textile making, artisan work and transportation activities. Houses tend to be occupied by anywhere from six to twenty people, using shallow wells for water. This water does not meet World Health Organization standards, and when untreated creates a serious health risk. In the past, the ward has been subject to perennial flooding, but recently efforts have been made to improve the drainage. The Anglican community in the Ago-Oba Parish is served by St. Michael's Church.

== Notable people ==
Former Ogun State governor Olusegun Osoba holds the traditional title of Oluwo of Ago-Oba, among others. In the April 2011 Presidential elections Osoba cast his vote in Ago-Oba for candidate Nuhu Ribadu of the Action Congress of Nigeria. Ribadu was the clear winner in the ward, with 142 votes to 65 for the PDP and 5 for the CPC. Former President Olusegun Obasanjo is of the Owu people. When his wife Stella Obasanjo died in 2005, her body was brought from Lagos to the Winners Chapel in Ago-Oba, from where she was taken to be buried in the Obasanjo family compound in nearby Ita-Eko. Alexander Abiodun Adebayo Bada (1930 - 2000), the second leader of the Celestial Church of Christ Worldwide, was the son of the Baale, or paramount head of Ago-Oba, a former president of the Ikeja customary court in Lagos and the organist of the African Church in Ereko-Lagos. The Seriki of Egbaland, Dr. Lateef Adegbite, has his office in Ago-Oba.

== Climate Change ==
Ago-Oba in Abeokuta, Nigeria, has a tropical wet and dry or savanna climate and is situated at an altitude of 71.72 meters (235.3 feet) above sea level (Classification: Aw). The district's annual temperature of 29.53oC (85.15oF) is 0.07% higher than the national average for Nigeria. Approximately 142.49 millimeters (5.61 inches) of precipitation and 225.62 wet days (61.81% of the time) are typical yearly totals for Ago-Oba,

== Climate Ago-Oba Abeokuta: Weather By Month ==
Month	Jan	Feb	Mar	Apr	May	Jun	Jul	Aug	Sep	Nov	Oct	Dec	Year
Record high °C (°F)	43.28(109.9)	44.28(111.7)	42.27(108.09)	41.26(106.27)	39.25(102.65)	39.25(102.65)	34.22(93.6)	34.22(93.6)	35.22(95.4)	38.24(100.83)	40.26(104.47)	41.26(106.27)	44.28(111.7)
Average high °C (°F)	38.01(100.42)	37.33(99.19)	36.05(96.89)	35.65(96.17)	34.02(93.24)	31.43(88.57)	29.59(85.26)	29.28(84.7)	29.93(85.87)	31.82(89.28)	34.4(93.92)	36.63(97.93)	33.67(92.61)
Daily mean °C (°F)	31.78(89.2)	32.08(89.74)	31.68(89.02)	31.4(88.52)	30.16(86.29)	28.17(82.71)	26.68(80.02)	26.26(79.27)	26.85(80.33)	28.21(82.78)	29.96(85.93)	31.14(88.05)	29.53(85.15)
Average low °C (°F)	23.37(74.07)	25.25(77.45)	25.98(78.76)	25.86(78.55)	25.3(77.54)	23.97(75.15)	23.05(73.49)	22.45(72.41)	23.15(73.67)	23.73(74.71)	24.3(75.74)	23.6(74.48)	24.16(75.49)
Record low °C (°F)	18.12(64.62)	21.13(70.03)	19.12(66.42)	21.13(70.03)	19.12(66.42)	21.13(70.03)	20.13(68.23)	19.12(66.42)	21.13(70.03)	20.13(68.23)	23.15(73.67)	19.12(66.42)	18.12(64.62)
Average precipitation mm (inches)	21.12(0.83)	51.26(2.02)	117.5(4.63)	107.88(4.25)	168.02(6.61)	221.15(8.71)	243.24(9.58)	239.89(9.44)	263.66(10.38)	199.44(7.85)	64.95(2.56)	11.8(0.46)	142.49(5.61)
Average precipitation days (≥ 1.0 mm)	4.76	11.34	19.77	18.48	21.5	24.15	27.44	25.71	27.63	25.8	15.19	3.84	18.8
Average relative humidity (%)	56.23	64.6	69.25	71.34	76.72	82.46	85.55	85.86	86.63	83.13	76.71	60.01	74.88
Mean monthly sunshine hours	11.38	11.18	10.78	10.73	10.42	9.62	8.76	8.12	8.89	10.21	10.88	11.19	10.18
