= Ajose =

Ajose is both a surname and a given name. Notable people with the name include:

Surname:

- Nicky Ajose (born 1991), English footballer
- Oladele Ajose, Nigerian academic
- Philip Hunsu Ajose (1932–2001), Nigerian religious leader

Given name:

- Ajose Olusegun (born 1979), Nigerian-born British boxer
