= Ketu people =

Ketu is the name of a Yoruba subgroup, historical kingdom and region straddling parts of what is now southeastern Republic of Benin and parts of southwest Nigeria. The chief town and traditional capital of the area was the town of Kétou (Kétu), which is considered to be one of the oldest capitals of the Yoruba-speaking people, tracing its establishment to a settlement founded by a descendant of Oduduwa (also known as; Odùduwà, Oòduà) called Sopasan or Soipasan. The Oba of the town were traditionally styled "Alákétu", and are related directly to Ile-Ife in present-day Nigeria. Other towns that were historically part of the Kétu Kingdom are;

- Ilara-Ogudo Yewa – Straddling the Nigeria-Benin international border (Nigerian side)
- Ilara Kanga – Straddling the Nigeria-Benin international border (Benin side)
- Iwoye ketu – Imeko Afon Local Government, Ogun state, Nigeria
- Ijoun – Imeko Afon Local Government, Ogun state, Nigeria
- Ijale Ketu – Imeko Afon Local Government, Ogun state, Nigeria
- Ijaka – Yewa North Local Government, Ogun state, Nigeria
- Idigny (Idiyin) – Plateau Department, Benin
- Igan Alade – Yewa North Local Government, Ogun state, Nigeria
- Imeko – Imeko Afon Local Government, Ogun state, Nigeria
- Illikimou – Plateau Department, Benin
- Ilé Ìká Yewa North Local Government Area, Ogun State, Nigeria.
- Iranji. Yewa North Local Government Area Ogun State Nigeria
- Egua – Imeko Afon Local Government, Ogun state, Nigeria
- Ebute Igboro – Yewa North Local Government, Ogun state, Nigeria
- Imoto – Imeko Afon Local Government, Ogun state, Nigeria
- Abotokio Yewa North Local Government Area Ogun State Nigeria
- Owode Ketu – Yewa North Local Government, Ogun state, Nigeria

Tata Yewa North Local Government Area Ogun State Nigeria

== History ==
Ketu is one of the sixteen original kingdoms established by the children of Oduduwa in Oyo mythic history, though this ancient pedigree has been somewhat neglected in contemporary Yoruba historical research, which tends to focus on communities within Nigeria. The exact status of Ketu within the Oyo empire however is contested. Oyo sources claim Ketu as a dependency with claims that the Ketu paid an annual tribute and that its ruler attended the Bere festival in Oyo. In any case, there is no doubt that Ketu and Oyo maintained friendly relations largely due to their historical, linguistic, cultural and ethnic ties.

The kingdom was one of the main enemies of the ascendant kingdom of Dahomey, often fighting against Dahomeans as part of Oyo's imperial forces, but ultimately succumbing to the Fon in the 1880s as the kingdom was ravaged. Many of Ketu's citizens were sold into slavery during these raids, which accounts for the kingdom's importance in Brazilian Candomblé. Ketu is often known as Queto in Portuguese orthography.

== Ewe connection ==
Ewe traditions refer to Ketu as Amedzofe ("origin of humanity") or Mawufe ("home of the Supreme Being"). It is believed that the inhabitants (or at least some) of Ketu originally belonged to the Oyo people of Nigeria and were pressed westward by a series of wars between the 12th and the 15th centuries. In Ketu, the ancestors of the Gbe speaking peoples (Ewe, Fon, Aja etc.) separated themselves from other refugees and began to establish their own identity, but were pressed even further westward by the Yoruba during the 14th and 15th centuries.

- c.1500 – Yoruba state moved its capital to Ketu.
- 1886 – Conquered by Dahomey
- 1893 – Restored by France under protectorate.

== See also ==
- List of rulers of the Yoruba state of Ketu
- Beninois Yoruba
