= Iwoye-Ketu =

- Autonomous community and Town
- Location of Iwoye-Ketu in Nigeria
- Coordinates: 7°33′24″N 2°44′59″E
- Country: Nigeria
- State: Ogun State
- Local Government Area: Imeko Afon
- Established: Before c.1600

Government
  - Type: Monarchy
  - Ooye: Sir Isaac Adegbenro Oyero

Population (2006)
  - Total: 25,000
- Time zone: UTC+1 (WAT)

Iwoye-Ketu is a town primarily located in Imeko Afon, Ogun State, in southwest Nigeria, with its western portion in Benin. The community shares a border with the Iwajowa local government area of Oyo State on the north. It is renowned for its production of cotton.

== History ==
Oral tradition says that the town of Iwoye-Ketu can be traced back to the ancient city of Ile Ife, the origin of Yoruba people and the cradle of Yoruba culture. The traditional rulers of the city were the sons of the Yoruba deity, Oduduwa as he was the first ruler of Ile Ife. In mythology, Iwoye-Ketu was created by Olumu, a legendary king and pioneer traditional ruler of the town who migrated from Ile Ife. Olomu migrated to Iwoye Ketu with three major items: a crown, a staff called "Opa Ogbo" and his deity called "Orisa Oluwa".

== Description and culture ==
The local farms are agrarian, and the local university is the Federal University of Agriculture, Abeokuta, FUNAAB. However, the Orisa Oluwa tradition forbids pig farming because pigs are dirty.

Local tradition also prohibits the use of umbrellas. Due to the community's honour and respect for their deity, strong protocols were developed around avoiding the use of umbrellas. It is not illegal to own an umbrella or for people who live in the town to use one outside the locality. The punishment needs to be clarified, as it just does not happen. It is suspected, but not known, that visitors to the town would be forgiven for breaking this taboo.

The border is such that some residences have some rooms in one country and others in another. All the shops are willing to accept Nigerian or Beninese currency, and stocks of imported products, such as rice, wine, perfume, and car tyres are readily available.

== Geography ==
Iwoye-Ketu is located primarily in Ogun State, southwestern Nigeria, with its western portion in Benin. It is inhabited by eight ethnic groups, including Egun, Hausa, Igbo, Fulani, Igede, Ohoi, and the Yorubas.
