= Paul Suru Maforikan =

Nigerian pastor (born 1930)

Paul Suru Maforikan was appointed Pastor and spiritual leader of the Celestial Church of Christ following the death of Gilbert Oluwatosin Jesse in October 2003.

== Early years ==
Maforikan was born on 19 September 1930 in Ajase, Benin, where his father had moved from Badagry, Nigeria. He was a member of Christ Apostolic Church before joining the Celestial Church Of Christ in 1948 shortly after its foundation. He followed the Pastor Founder S.B.J. Oschoffa to Nigeria. He was Oyo State Evangelist for 10 years before being appointed a Deputy Pastor in December 2002. He was proclaimed Pastor of the Celestial Church Of Christ Worldwide within two days of the death Gilbert Jesse. His appointment was made by the council of superiors of CCC Worldwide. He took up this position at a time when the CCC had split into four factions. The others were led by Rev pastor st Agbaosi of Porto Novo in Benin, and in Lagos by Superior Evangelist Josiah Kayode Owudunni of Ijeshatedo Parish and by Pastor Emmanuel Oschoffa who was chosen by members of the board of trustees.

== Leadership disputes ==
In an attempt to resolve the dispute over church leadership, in March 2005 Pastors Moforikan and Oshoffa met with other church leaders in Porto-Novo, Benin home of the founder of the church. They agreed to hold a further meeting two weeks later with eleven delegates from each side to take every possible measure to resolve the issue. In November 2005 Iepe Asebiomo, leader of the Unification and Renaissance Mission of the Celestial Church of Christ, noted the growing number of factions with heads claiming to be CCC pastor. These included Daniel B. Agbaosi of Benin, and in Lagos, Nigeria Paul Maforikan in Tejuosho, Emmanuel Oshoffa in Ketu, Josiah Owodunni in Ijeshatedo and Edward Oladokun in Ikorodu. US-based Bolanle Shonekan was also a claimant. Yet others had formed separate churches.

In November 2006 pastor Jacob Ediémou Blin laid a complaint with the prosecutor in Côte d'Ivoire against Moforikan for usurpation of title. Later that month church officials expressed shock when Blin said at Port-Bouet that the CCC was all his private property. This brought the number of factions of the church up to five. Maforikan paid a long visit to South Africa in 2008, arriving on 11 June 2008 and visiting all the parishes over the three-month period. In an April 2009 interview in Abidjan, Côte d'Ivoire Maforikan said the founder "Papa" Oshoffa had prophesied in 1961 that Maforikan would be his successor. He described the disunity in the church as the work of the devil.

In April 2010 a group of leaders called the Celestial Church of Christ Unification and Reform Group petitioned the Inspector-General of Police to arrest those claiming to be pastors of the church. They said that such claims were contrary to a Supreme Court ruling that there would be no pastor in the church until it had rewritten its constitution. The claimants were Josiah Owodunni, Paul Maforikan, Steven Orovboni, Godwin Shonekan, Emmanuel Oschoffa and Edward Oladesu. They were invited by the Lagos state police to give information to a fact finding investigation, but only Orovboni and Maforikan responded in person. The group's secretary, Dele Ojogbede, said the self-styled pastors had been told that they would be held for contempt of court unless they dropped their claims and worked towards unity.
