= Philip Hunsu Ajose =

Nigerian religious leader (born 1932)

Philip Hunsu Ajose (10 August 1932 - 2 March 2001) was the third Pastor of the Celestial Church of Christ (CCC), succeeding Alexander Abiodun Adebayo Bada on 2 October 2000 and being formally declared leader on 24 December 2000. Shortly after being appointed he fell ill, dying on 2 March 2001.

== Early years ==
Ajose was born on 10 August 1932 in Badagry, Lagos State, Nigeria. His father was a co-founder of the United Methodist African Church at Eleja, Badagry. Ajose attended St Thomas Primary School, Badagry (1939 - 1949). He was accepted by the Nigeria Ports Authority for a three-year course in Mechanical Engineering, graduating with a certificate in internal combustion engineering. He obtained a job with the Electric Corporation of Nigeria (ECN) in 1951, working at the Ijora Power Station. He was transferred to Benin City as superintendent in 1961, Oshogbo in 1967, Ajure in 1970 and Badagry in 1971 where he held the position of Superintendent District Manager.

== Church career ==
While working with the ECN Ajose was active in the CCC, and established over 200 parishes of the church in the different locations to which he was assigned. Ajose resigned from the ECN in 1976 to work full-time for the CCC. Recognising his administrative ability, the founder Celestial Samuel Oshoffa assigned him to replace the pioneer Shepherd Overseas, Paul O. Okuneye JP. in 1979, to run Overseas Diocese of the CCC with headquarters in London, covering Great Britain, Europe, Canada, and the United States. After Alexander Bada died, the World Committee Of Shepherd selected Papa Ajose as Pastor and Spiritual Head of CCC Worldwide. Shortly after being appointed he fell ill, dying on 2 March 2001. He was buried on 30 March 2001 at the conference centre of the Church at Celestial Holy City Imeko, Ogun State. There was a leadership dispute over the succession to Ajose, with some declaring Gilbert Oluwatosin Jesse the leader, while others recognised the Reverend Emmanuel Oschoffa, son of church founder Samuel Oshoffa.
