= Ilara Yewa =

Ilara-Ogudo Yewa
- Town
- Motto: Ilara Alewilese
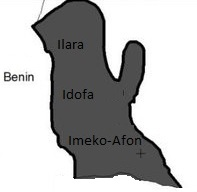
- Map of Imeko-Afon

- Location in Nigeria
- Coordinates: 7°38′N 2°52′E
- Country: Nigeria
- State: Ogun State
- LGA: Imeko Afon

Government
  - Local Government Chairman and the Head of the Local Government Council: Chairman Hon. Fadipe Yaya Akande (APC)

Area
  - Total: 1,210 km^{2} (470 sq mi)
- Elevation: 180 m (600 ft)

Population (2006 census)
  - Total: 20,000
  - Density: 17/km^{2} (43/sq mi)
- Time zone: UTC+1 (WAT)
- 3-digit postal code prefix: 111
- ISO 3166 code: NG.OG.IA

Ilara or Ilara Yewa is a major Yoruba town in the west of Ogun State, Nigeria about 91 km (57 mi) northwest of Abeokuta. It lies on the border between Nigeria and Benin. Its elevation is 183 m (600 ft) above sea level. Ilara Yewa is on the international border and is about 50 km (31 mi) by road from Ketu, a major trading town in Benin.

== History ==
=== Settlement ===
Ilara-Yewa is an offshoot community of Ketu, a town situated in the present-day Benin Republic. History has it that, Ketu people migrated from Ile-Ife under the leadership of Sopasan (Alaketu), son of Oduduwa, progenitor of the Yoruba race, to found the Ketu Kingdom. Ilara had maintained the affinity with Ketu until Ketu lost Ilara to the British protectorate as a result in boundary demarcation.

Alaketu of Ketu from time immemorial is the prescribed Authority over the Oloola of Ilara chieftaincy matters in towns and the villages of the Ketu speaking people. The town had two Ruling houses before, but later the elders in the town met and agreed that the ruling houses should increase to four. The names of the Ruling houses are:-Isako Ruling House, Idogbede Ruling House, Otesu Ruling House, Faningbe/Igbaka Ruling House.

=== Legend ===
People under the leadership of Baba Obosu, Aduitan, Ogbe and Dosunmu to mention just a few left Ketu in search of wild-life. On getting to the forest they killed an elephant, and as they opened its stomach they found "Oṣé Ṣango" and "Edun Ara" (thunderstone). They were amazed and afraid of the turn of events as such they consulted Ifá who told them not to eat the elephant but bury it instead and settle in that place. The elephant was buried in the forest and they called the name of the place Ogudo and the forest was called Igbo-Ogudo (Ibiti Ogun ni ki ndo abi Tedo), meaning: "the place where Ogun (deity of iron) said I should settle".

=== Colonial years ===
The European powers divided West Africa between them at the Berlin Conference of 1884–85. The Ketus had earlier been conquered by Dahomey in 1886, and they went to the French who restored Ketu in 1893 under a protectorate. The flag was hosted. The French colonist asked if there were other communities who wanted to join, which made the Ketus reach out to Ilara during the reign of Regent Alaba Ida the then Alaketu in 1893–1894. She selected some of her chiefs to accompany the colonial Master to Ilara. However, the Ilara people were unwilling to join the French Colony. To signify their interest or displeasure, the flag of French and British was hoisted so that the people should choose the flag of the country they wished to follow. The then Baale Aseje stood up to choose a British flag because they had previously consulted the Oracle Ifá who instructed them to go with the British. The Alaketu delegates were furious about the decision of the Ilara people and decided that, since Ilara had chosen to follow British against the wishes of Alaketu the prescribing authority over Ilara, the British flag would be hoisted at her backyard. That is why Ilara was divided.

== Governance ==
The Imeko-Afon local government was created from the old Egbado North local government in December 1996, during the military regime of General Sani Abacha.

- Chief Lawrence Sunday Fatokun was the first Executive Chairman of Imeko Afon Local government an indigence of Ilara Indigenes from the town including the
- Hon Owolabi Àsàmú, member of the House of Representatives, Abuja 1999-2003 under the Alliance for Democracy AD party.
- Late. Pa Chief Ogunjobi Samuel the first Oluwo and member Caretaker committee of then Ketu Local government, Yewa Local Government area Ogun State.

== Councilors ==
1. Late. Pa Adeluyi the grandfather of the late Oloola.
2. Late. Pa Osunleke Emmanuel.
3. Hon.Chief Bankole Moses Akanni.The Asiwaju of Ketu land.
4. Hon Adéluyi Patrick A. from Alagbe, Ilara Ward.
5. Hon Adéyemí Peter, won the best CDA award for Ilara in 2006 when he constructed the palace for Oloola of Ilara, Ilara Ward.
6. Hon Fakeye Yaya councilor for Ilara Ward.
7. Hon Babatude Gbadebo councillor for Ilara Ward..
8. Hon Falola Adegbenro Ilara Ward.
9. Hon Yusuf Samond. Ilara Ward.
10. The present councillor is Hon Sola Kugbakin 2021 to date Ilara Ward.

== Economy ==
Due to its location, the people of Ilara are mostly traders who engage in international trade between Nigeria and Benin. Farming is another economic activity. The wild vegetation is a mixture of Savannah belt and sparse forest. The climate is tropical with the rainy season commencing around March and ending in November. The soil is fertile for tomatoes, cucumber, golden melon, cocoa, cassava, and other crops like pepper, maize, groundnuts, yam, and teak-timber. There has been a market in the town since about 1898.

== Culture and community ==
Among the annual cultural festival are Oro, Gelede, Bolojo, Iwe cultural Dance, Kete, Sakara, ere Olode, Egungun. The Egungun (masquerade) festival kicks off with “Agan” night (usually on Friday). The following Saturday witness the Egungun parade from their groove “Igbo-Igbale or Igbo-Oje” located at the outskirt of the town, round the major street in a long single queue.

For the Oro festival women are forbidden to come out throughout the festivities, usually three Saturdays in a Year. The Iwe cultural dance is organized by men and women of the same age group to entertain the community on a chosen day of the year. Common attire is chosen and worn on the day. Men use black horse tail for the dance while the women dig it with locally made hand fans.

The Ilara people are fond of "Amala" locally called "Oka" (made from cassava flour), "Tuwo" locally called "Lagba" (made with maize flour), pounded yam, and eko, "Opoporu" soup commonly called "Obe Oodun" is peculiar to the people and the soup is common especially during the festivals. The "Efo-Yarin/Efo-Iyanrin/ Agumata" is the people choice especially when they are to eat "Eko" Imoyo, is prepared by slicing raw tomatoes, onions, peppers mixed with locust beans (Iru) smoke fish or meat.

== Villages and areas under Ilara-Yewa ==
- Kanga (Benin)
- Alagbe
- Ijumu
- Oke-Odo
- Idisen-en
- Sakara
- Yeye
- Agbaluka
- Alakuta
- Ogelete
- Daramola
- Igbo Osun
- Igboimoki
- Aitedo
- Apatae igesu
- Igbo-Ogudo
- Odò
- Atan-Efun

=== Areas and communities ===
- Agbogi
- Isokia
- Iyamata
- Imalefalafia
- Olorunsogo
- Ajegunle
- Ajelanwa
- Lafenwa
- Oloruntele
- Oke-Agbede

== Education ==
The town has two public secondary schools namely: Community High Ilara, established in 1980 and Muslim high School Agbogi, Ilara. The town has two community-based secondary the project been financed solely from the funds locally generated: United Christian College Ajegunle Ilara, and Ajoda Community Grammar School Oke-Odo, Idi-Seen Ilara. There are four public primaries school, namely Methodist Primary School Ilara Ata-Ijoun Road, St John Catholic School Ilara, Muslim Primary School Ilara, Community Primary Ilara Atan-Efun, Ilara. Both Methodist and Catholic Primary School are split into Schools School I & II. The town has two community-owned primary schools still awaiting government takeover; they are Oloola community Primary School Ilara, and Ilara-Ogudo Community Primary School Isokia, Ilara.

There are two private Government Approved Primary and Secondary School in Ilara they are: Iranlowo Oluwa Nursery & Primary School, Fatokun Memorial College Ilara and Living Grace secondary School, Ilara. There are two Primary Schools in Benin side of the town Ecole Primaire Scolaire du Benin Kanga, Ilara and Igbo-Ogudo, Ilara. One Secondary School CEG Ecole Secondaire du Benin Kobejo Road Ilara.

== Religion ==
There is mutual understanding between the adherents of the three main religions in town, Christianity, Islam and traditional Yoruba religion. The Methodist Church Nigeria was the first church in town around 1915 the mission established the Primary School in 1935. Followed by Catholic Mission of St. John Catholic Church which equally established school known as St.John Catholic School in about 1957 and Christ Apostolic Church in 1971 then another Church follows. The Muslim community came in some years later and the first chief Imam was Kazeem from Igbaka quarters.

The traditional cultural activities predominantly among Ilara people are typical of the Ketu speaking people. In term of traditional religion virtually all the major deities of the Yoruba i.e. Ogun, Ṣango, Ọṣun, Ifa, and others are worshipped in the community. However, the Aagbona, Ogun-Oko, Ogun-Imasa, Orisa-Gbongbo are peculiar to the community. The Aagbona is the central shrine. The Ogun-Oko is symbolized by a heavy stone place upon the three wooden pillars at the major junction in Ilara, (Kanga Ilara Benin side), from this point the Iwe-Odun cultural dance kicks off to the other part of the town. The orisa Gbongbo equally falls to Benin side and is located along a major road to Kobejo. It is considered taboo to pass along the street without paying homage to it. So passer-by singing its praise bending and standing upright rhythmically along with the Orisagbongbo shrine site.

== Notable people ==
- Late Adukanle the Baale 1936 -1975
- Late Chief Arikanki( NINU IFA ) Oguntade the Eesaba 1930–1983
- Late Chief Kehinde Fadunsin the Balógun,
- Late Chief Kugbakin the Odofin of Ilara
- Late Chief Lawrence Sunday Fatokun The First Executive Chairman Of IMeko-Afon Local Government, Ogun State
- Late Oba Samuel Alabi Adeluyi (The First Oloola of Ilara) 1983–2020
- Chief Moses.Akanni Bankole. The Asiwauju of Ilara, and Asiwaju of Ketu Land.
- Hon Prince Tosin Adeluyi The Ex-Executive Chairman Of Imeko-Afon Local Government.

These people were installed in 1978 during the reign of

- Chief Adukanle the Baale Of Ilara then (ONI ILU).
- Chief Àlàyé Joseph the Ẹkẹrin Ilu.

== Ilara-Ogudo Anthem ==
- Oloyee pa
- Ekun o
- Onigbajare mu o
- Ina boo okunkun Biri Biri
- Isana lekule gbo
- Ekun eye idi fule fule
- Ekun nba mu nma se.
