= Alexander Abiodun Adebayo Bada =

Alexander Abiodun Adebayo Bada (4 December 1930 - 8 September 2000) was the second Pastor of the Celestial Church of Christ (CCC), succeeding the founder Samuel Oshoffa in December 1985.

== Early life ==
Bada was born on 4 December 1930. His father was the Baale, or viceroyal chieftain, of the Ago-Oba area of Abeokuta and the organist of the African Church, Ereko, Lagos, and Bada was brought up in this church. Bada attended St John’s School, Iloro, Ilesa (1936–1942) and Ilesha Grammar School (1943–1949). He began work with Nigerian Breweries in 1950 and was promoted to stock control supervisor in 1952.

== Church career ==
In mid-1952 he met Superior Evangelist S. O. Ajanlekoko of the CCC, who profoundly influenced him. He left his job to work full-time for the church, becoming a Senior Elder in 1954, Leader in 1955, Senior Leader in December 1960 and Evangelist in 1964. On 24 December 1972 he became a Senior Evangelist, and on 25 December 1980 a Supreme Evangelist, the first person to attain this position which implied that he was next in rank to the pastor Samuel Oshoffa.

When Oschoffa died on 10 September 1985 after a car crash without having defined a successor, several of his followers claimed the leadership, leading to a legal conflict that continued for many years. However, the Board of Trustees announced that Bada was the new Pastor and spiritual leader at the annual CCC convocation on 25 December 1985. He was formally installed on 25 December 1987 at the CCC world headquarters at Imeko City in Ogun State, Nigeria, and led the church for the next 15 years.

Bada died on 8 September 2000 at Greenwich Hospital, London. His body was returned to Nigeria for burial on the 29th day of September, 2000 at Celestial City, Imeko. Governor Olusegun Osoba represented President Olusegun Obasanjo at the funeral ceremony. Bada was survived by his wives, children and grandchildren. He was succeeded by Philip Hunsu Ajose, who was appointed leader of the Church on 2 October 2000.
