= Institute for Linguistic Heritage and Diversity =

French institution of higher education

- Founder: Anne-Marie Turcan-Verkerk
- Established: 2020
- Mission: Promotion of ancient and lesser-known modern languages
- Directors: Samra Azarnouche; Andreas Stauder
- Owner: EPHE-PSL
- Location: Paris, France
- Website: https://ilaraen.hypotheses.org/

Institute for Linguistic Heritage and Diversity (French: Institut des langues rares), or ILARA, is a French institution of higher education, established by ministerial decree on 5 August 2020. It is one of the three institutes of the École pratique des hautes études (EPHE), itself a constituent college of the Université PSL.

In 2024, ILARA was awarded the Medal of the Singer-Polignac Foundation, which recognises outstanding associations or organisations working in the fields of the arts, sciences or socio-cultural initiatives.

== Academic and scientific activities ==
Founded at the initiative of Anne-Marie Turcan-Verkerk, Director of Studies at EPHE-PSL, ILARA is a centre for training in, expertise on and resources relating to languages that are rarely studied in a university setting.

Its course offer covers both ancient languages known from written sources, such as Lydian, Syriac, Old Georgian, and Classic Maya, and modern oral languages, such as Mwotlap, Innu, Wayana, and Tabasaran.

The institute also produces open-access multimedia content, including series of themed talks and science outreach videos, which have become points of reference for the general press. ILARA also regularly participates in public-facing scholarly events.

In November 2024, ILARA was represented at the 10th United Nations Alliance of Civilizations Global Forum in Cascais, Portugal, as a panelist in a discussion on multilingualism.
