= Amedzofe (history) =

Ewe name for Ketu

In Ewe oral history, Amedzofe (Ewe: [amedzoɸɛ]), literally 'origin/home of humanity', is one of the names for Ketu. Ketu, in present-day Benin, was a central place in the history of the Gbe peoples. The Gbe peoples originally were closer to the Yoruba Oyo people of Nigeria, but they were pressed westward by a series of wars between the 10th and the 13th century. In Ketu, the ancestors of the Gbe-speaking peoples separated themselves from other refugees and began to establish their own identity.

== See also ==
- Gbe languages#History
- Amedzofe, Ghana, a settlement
