= Emmanuel Oshoffa =

Pastor and spiritual leader of the Celestial Church of Christ

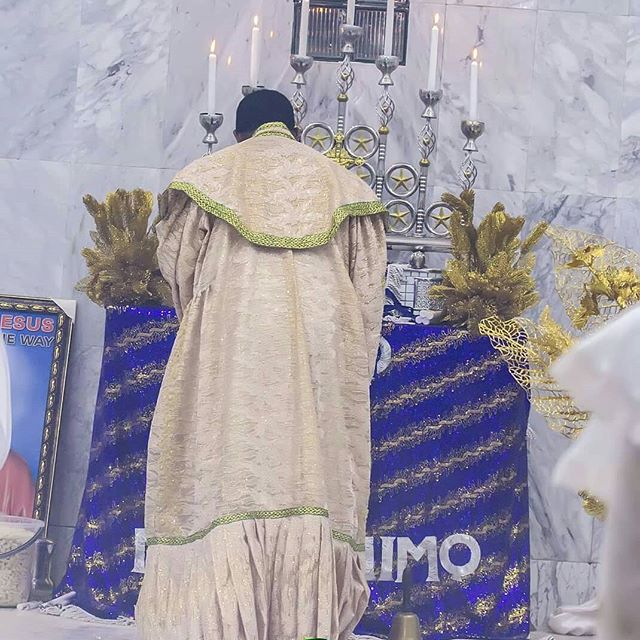
Rev. Oshoffa leading over 100,000 pilgrims in the Christmas Eve service at the Celestial Church World Headquarters, Imeko.

Emmanuel Mobiyina Oshoffa (full name Emmanuel Mobiyina Friday Adebowale Abiodun vihan Oshoffa, born 25 December 1948) is the pastor and spiritual head of the Celestial Church of Christ (CCC). Although Emmanuel Oshoffa controls the overwhelming fraction of the church, and the Holy Pilgrimage city in Imeko where the founder, his father, was buried, a rival faction considers Beni Omoge, ostensibly the successor to Maforikan Surulere to be the leader of their own faction. Oshoffa was installed as head of the CCC in December 2002. as successor to pastor Philip Hunsu Ajose, who died in March 2001. Mobiyina Oshoffa is the first son of the Pastor Founder (Late Reverend Prophet Samuel Bilewou Joseph Oshoffa) and he is the pastor of the major faction of Celestial Church of Christ, worldwide.

Oshoffa was born in 1948 at Kpave, French Dahomey (now Benin), and he has been part of the choir at Port Novo church before his migration to France. As instructed by his father, only him and First Shadrach hospital management knew about the whereabouts of the founder of the church for over twenty-four hours following the accident of September 1985. He was therefore in position to give some account of the prophet's final moments. Oshoffa attended university in Paris, earning his bachelor's degree in animal biological science in 1976 and a master's degree from the University of Biological Science, Nancy, France in 1977. The Diocese of France and the Overseas Départements and Territories largely founded by Ivory Coast Celestial Christians and frequented by many West Indians, among others; since 1986 has been led by Emmanuel Oschoffa. He was appointed head of the CCC Diocese of France by predecessor, Reverend Abiodun Bada in 1997. Other sources state 1987. In 1989, Emmanuel Oshoffa baptized the congolese doctor and Catholic, Malela, who had come to Paris for a surgical operation, hence starting the church at Brazzaville. In December 2002, while preparing to travel to Port-Novo from France, he was called to Imeko to pastor the church.
