= École pratique des hautes études =

French research and education institution in Paris

Coordinates: 48.8311°N 2.3400°E

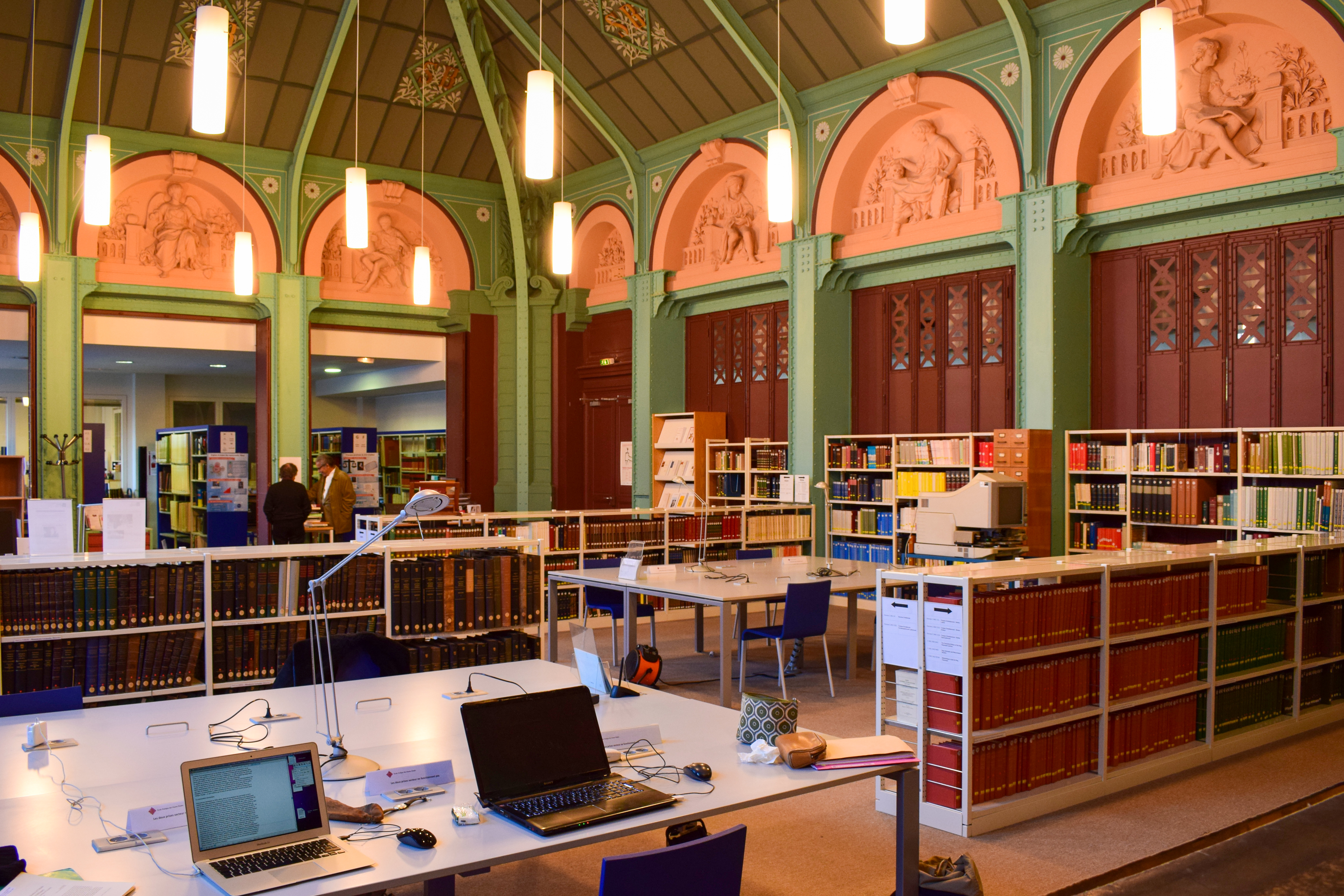
- Type: Établissement public à caractère scientifique, culturel et professionnel
- Established: 1868
- Affiliations: Université PSL
- Director: Hubert Bost (since 2013)
- Location: Paris, France
- Website: ephe.psl.eu

The École pratique des hautes études (French pronunciation: [ekɔl pʁatik de ot.z‿etyd]), abbreviated EPHE, is a French postgraduate top level educational institution, a Grand Établissement.

EPHE is a constituent college of the Paris Sciences et Lettres University (together with ENS Ulm, Paris Dauphine or École des Mines). The college is closely linked to French School of the Far East and French Institute of the Near East.

EPHE has formed experts in Asian and Islamic studies and among them investment bankers, diplomat and military officers specialised in these areas.

Prominent researchers in military strategy have taught in EPHE in the past such as Hervé Coutau-Bégarie. In addition, researchers in natural sciences (including neurosciences and chemistry) teach at EPHE (among them polar explorer Jean-Baptiste Charcot and chemist Marcellin Berthelot).

== Overview ==
The EPHE brings together 260 faculty members and about 3,000 students/attenders into three core departments called "Sections": Earth and Life Sciences, Historical and Philological Sciences, and Religious Sciences.

It has headquarters in Paris, and has several campuses across France (Paris and its region, Nancy, Dijon, Lyon, Grenoble, Montpellier, Perpignan, Toulouse, Bordeaux, Caen, Dinard, French Polynesia). Teaching and research in human sciences are conducted in Paris, notably at the Sorbonne, the historical house of the former University of Paris and in the building of Maison des Sciences de l'Homme.

The college provides Master's and Doctorate degrees, and the postdoctoral Habilitation à Diriger des Recherches. The School also offers its specific postgraduate degrees – the "Diplôme EPHE" and the "Diplôme post-doctoral" – as well as joint degrees with other universities.

The EPHE maintains extensive cooperative exchanges with universities and research institutions. Priority areas of cooperation are in Europe, the Mediterranean, Middle-East and Asia.

== Présidents of EPHE ==
- 1990–1994: Monique Adolphe
- 1994–1998: Bruno Neveu
- 1998–2002: Jean Baubérot
- 2002–2006: Marie-Françoise Courel
- 2006–2011: Jean-Claude Waquet
- 2011–2013: Denis Pelletier
- Since 7 November 2013: Hubert Bost

== History of EPHE ==
The École pratique des hautes études was established by imperial decree on 31 July 1868 at the initiative of Victor Duruy, then Minister of Education under Emperor Napoleon III. Its purpose was to introduce research in academia and, more importantly, to promote academic training through research. It was intended to promote a practical form of scholarship designed to produce knowledge and to be taught in seminars and laboratories, as was being practiced in Germany at the time. Faculty members were to be dedicated, available to students and others for collaboration, accessible, and advance a form of education dependent on a framework of a direct relationship between the master and his disciple.

The School originally had four Sections: Mathematics (I); Physics and Chemistry (II); Natural Sciences and Physiology (III); Philological and Historical Sciences (IV). An Economics Section was added in 1869, but was not developed. Section V, Religious Sciences, was added in 1886.

Section VI, called Economic and Social Sciences, was founded after the Second World War. This section included the study of anthropology, and the French made substantial contributions to these fields, particularly in the structuralism of Claude Lévi-Strauss and others. Their scholars were doing research in South America, Africa and Southeast Asia. There was also research in ethnopsychoanalysis and ethnopsychiatry, particularly by Georges Devereux, who joined the Section in 1963 and influenced more than a generation of scholars. In 1975, Section VI was separated to establish a new school, the École des hautes études en sciences sociales (EHESS).

The institution has been reorganized into three Sections: Earth and Life Sciences, Historical and Philological Sciences, Religious Sciences. Many renowned scholars have lectured at the EPHE or worked in its laboratories.

== Recent developments ==
Since 2006, the EPHE has been setting up specialized centers which draw on the same scientific resources of the Sections, but whose primary purpose is to develop disciplinary expertise and vocational training, and to disseminate scholarly knowledge. Three institutes have been established to date: The European Institute of Religious Sciences (IESR), the Pacific Coral Reef Institute (IRCP) and the Transdisciplinary Institute for the Study of Aging (ITEV).

More recently the EPHE has undertaken, as one of nine project sponsors, to create a new research campus in the human and social sciences, the "Campus Condorcet". Finally, the school has joined PSL, Paris Sciences et Lettres in December 2014.

== Training ==
Courses at the EPHE are taught in accordance with the institution's founding educational principle: to train in research by means of adapted practice in lectures, seminars or lab sessions, in the following areas: Earth and Life Sciences; Historical and Philological Sciences; Religious Sciences.

This tradition, which has endured since the founding of the EPHE, is at the root of the EPHE's main vocation in preparing for research degrees today.

=== Studies programs ===
- Two institution-specific postgraduate degrees (in each of the three Sections): "Diplôme de l'EPHE", "Diplôme post-doctoral de l'EPHE";
- Two master's degrees: The Master in Biology, Health, Environment (research degree, 3 specialties), The Master in Historical, Philological and Religious Sciences (Religious Sciences and Society, European, Mediterranean and Asian Sciences);
- The Doctorate, in three subjects areas prepared at the same Doctoral School: Integrated Systems, Biodiversity and Environment ("SIEB"), History, Documents and Texts ("HTD"), Religions and Thought Systems ("RSP").

The EPHE also confers the Habilitation à diriger des recherches (HDR) and offers joint university degrees ("DIU") in collaboration with other institutions.

=== Earth and Life Sciences ===
The Earth and Life Sciences Section groups faculty and laboratories in Paris and throughout France. All laboratories have joint research units in place with other institutions (universities, CNRS, INSERM, INRIA, MNHN). One laboratory is in French Polynesia on the island of Moorea, where the EPHE has a research station. The School also has a station in coastal geomorphology in Dinard on the coast of Brittany. The Section's research is carried out within four networks: environment and cellular regulation; neurosciences; environment and Society; biodiversity dynamics.

=== Historical and Philological Sciences ===
The Historical and Philological Sciences Section covers the study of languages, the explanation and commentary of documentary sources, written and book history, and the history of knowledge. Geographically, the emphasis is on the Mediterranean, Asia and Europe, where writing was earliest developed. It remains a field of choice for philological and, more generally, scholarly criticism of written and unwritten sources, aimed at resolving questions of language and history. The Section may also be regarded as one large laboratory devoted to the study of works, cultures and power systems in periods preceding contemporary times, and reaching back over a very long time span within a vast Eurasian area.

In 2010, the Section included 92 full professors and lecturers, and it welcomes every year a large number of foreign scholars as guest fellows.

Topics covered by the Historical and Philological Sciences Section fall into eight broad categories:

- Ancient Near and Middle East;
- Classical Antiquity;
- Muslim worlds;
- History and Philology of Medieval Period;
- Modern and contemporary History of the West;
- India and the Far East;
- History of the Arts and Archeology;
- Linguistics.

Historical and Philological Sciences Publications: The Historical and Philological Sciences Section publishes two collections at Editions Honoré Champion:

- Bibliothèque de l'École des hautes études, Historical and Philological Sciences;
- Advanced studies in contemporary history).

It also publishes six other collections at the publisher Droz Publisher:

- Advanced studies in numismatics;
- Advanced oriental studies, divided in two series: Near and Middle East, Far East;
- Advanced studies of the Greco-Roman world;
- Advanced studies in comparative Islamic and oriental history;
- Advanced studies of medieval and modern times;
- History and civilization of the book.

=== Religious Sciences ===
Established in 1886, the Religious Sciences Section is reputed for its original scholarship in the subject of religions, which it examines in a secular and cross-cultural spirit. By emphasizing comparative and interdisciplinary study, it is the only academic body in France to cover this field so extensively, using a wide range of scientific approaches.

The Section's teaching in the area of research extends into the diverse cultural and linguistic fields, from Antiquity to modern and contemporary times. Strongly committed to the philological tradition, it also naturally draws on disciplines or resources as diverse and complementary as history, archeology, iconology, law, philosophy, ethnology, anthropology and sociology, as well as the cinema and new technologies.

The Section included 54 full professors and 12 lecturers in 2010, and it welcomes every year a large number of foreign scholars as guest fellows.

Topics covered may be grouped in nine broad categories:

- Religious ethnology (Africa, Americas, Europe, Australia/Oceania);
- Religions of Asia;
- Polytheistic Religions of the Ancient World;
- Judaism;
- Christianity and its margins;
- Islam;
- Laicities and Religions in the Contemporary World;

The Religious Sciences Section publishes two collections:

- The "Bibliothèque de l'École des hautes études", Religious Sciences (BEHE, SR), published by Brepols, which includes two series: History and prosopography of the Religious Sciences Section and Sources and documents.
- The Conferences of the EPHE, published by Le Cerf. Of interest to both specialists and the educated general public, this recently created collection notably includes transcripts of lectures given at the School by guest research fellows.

=== Doctoral School ===
The Doctoral School is also responsible for the attribution of scholarships, grants and financial aid. It implements the EPHE's doctoral studies program in accordance with the plan defined in the institution's quadriennal contract. It operates with other services of the EPHE such as the Education and International Relations divisions. The Doctoral School is organized along three subject areas:

- Integrated Systems, Environment and Biodiversity;
- Religions and Thought Systems;
- History, Texts and Documents.

=== Institutes ===
The EPHE comprises three institutes:

- IREL (Institute of the study of religions and secularism)
- ILARA (Institute for Linguistic Heritage and Diversity)
- ITEV (Transdiciplinary Institute of the Study of Ageing)

== See also ==
- Academic staff of the École pratique des hautes études
- École pratique des hautes études alumni
- École libre des hautes études
