= Amedzofe, Ghana =

Amedzofe
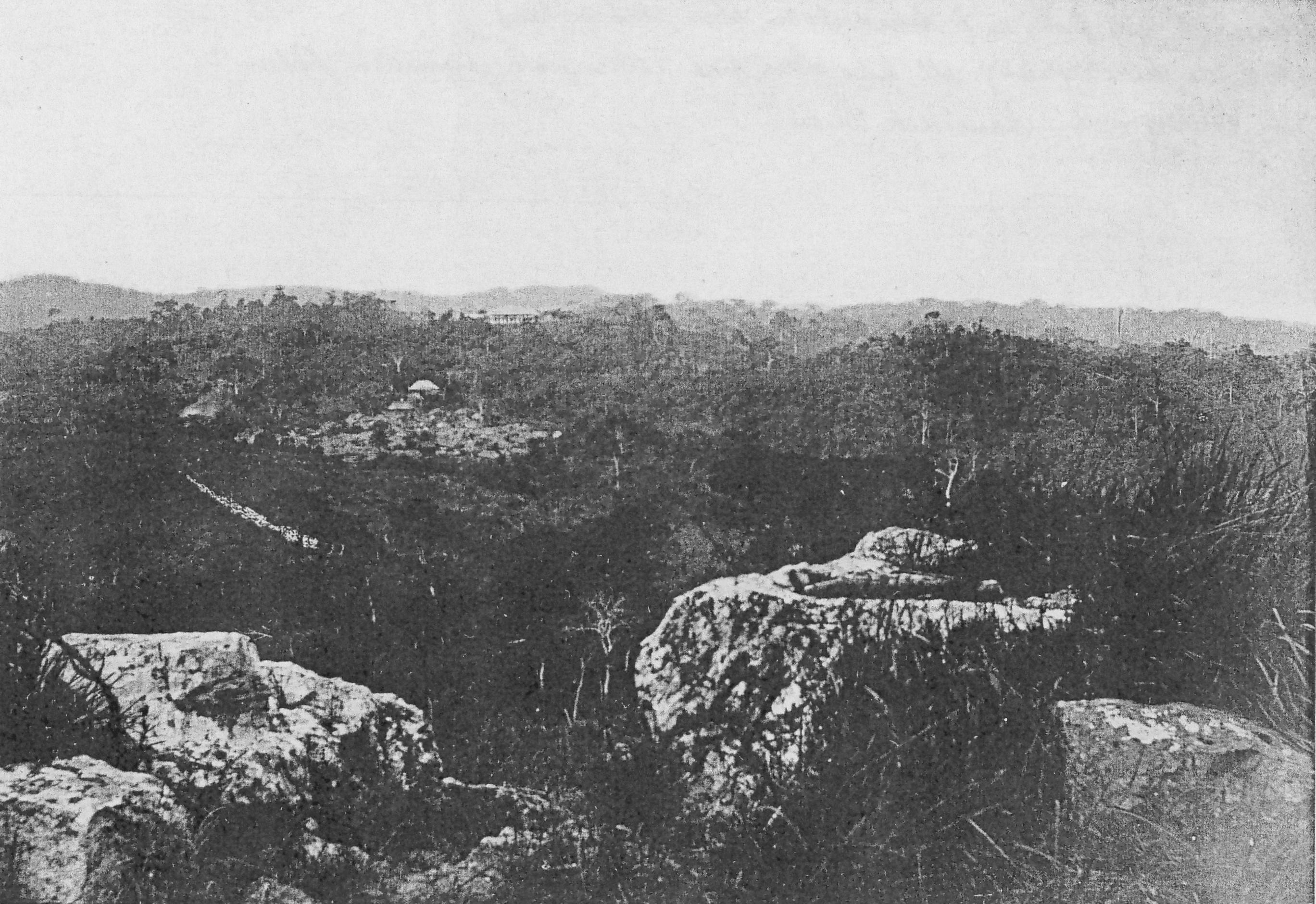
- View from the Gemi in Southern direction to the village of Amedzofe and the mission above the village.

- Location in Ghana
- Coordinates: 6°50′N 0°26′E
- Country: Ghana
- Region: Volta Region
- District: Ho West District

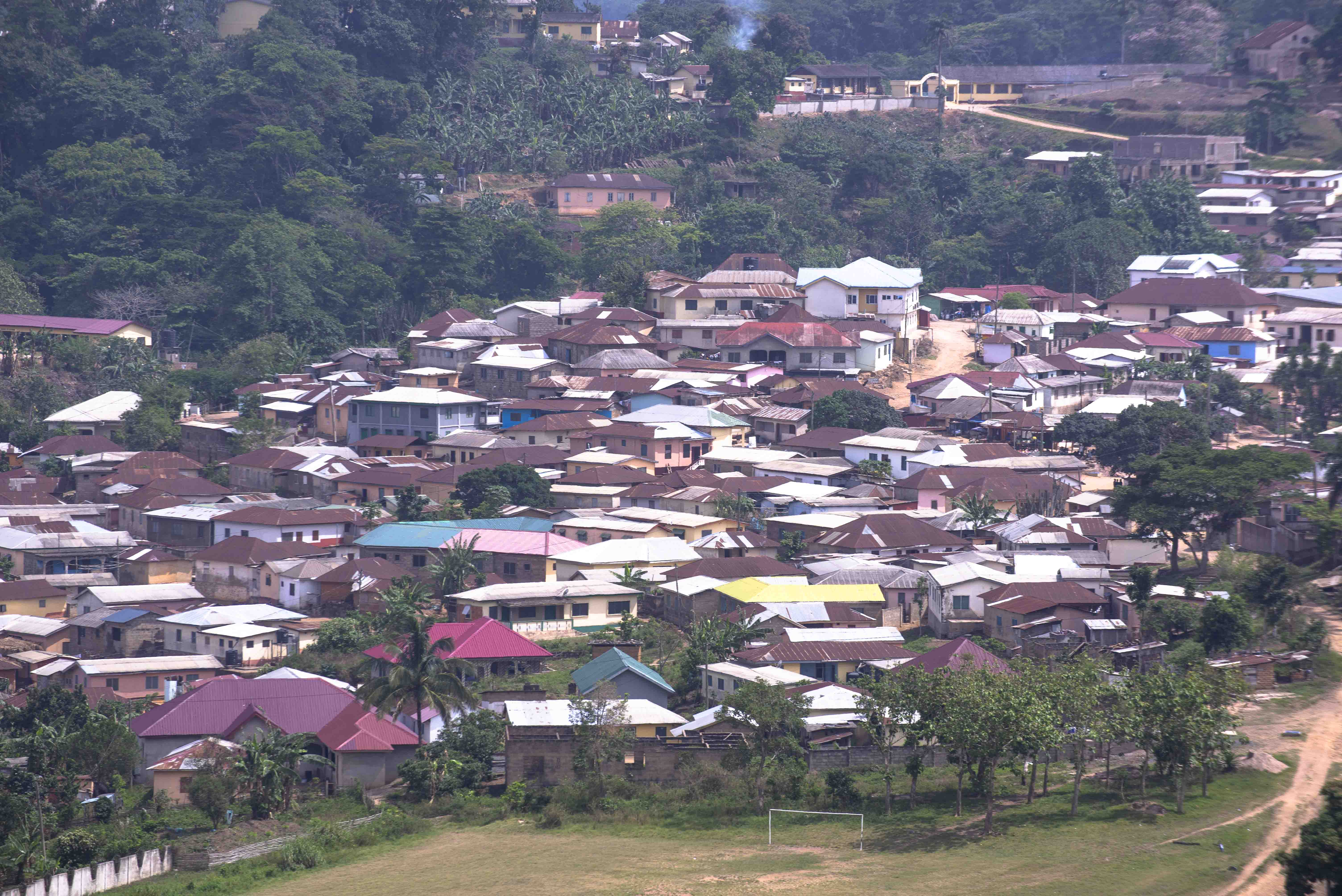
Amedzofe houses

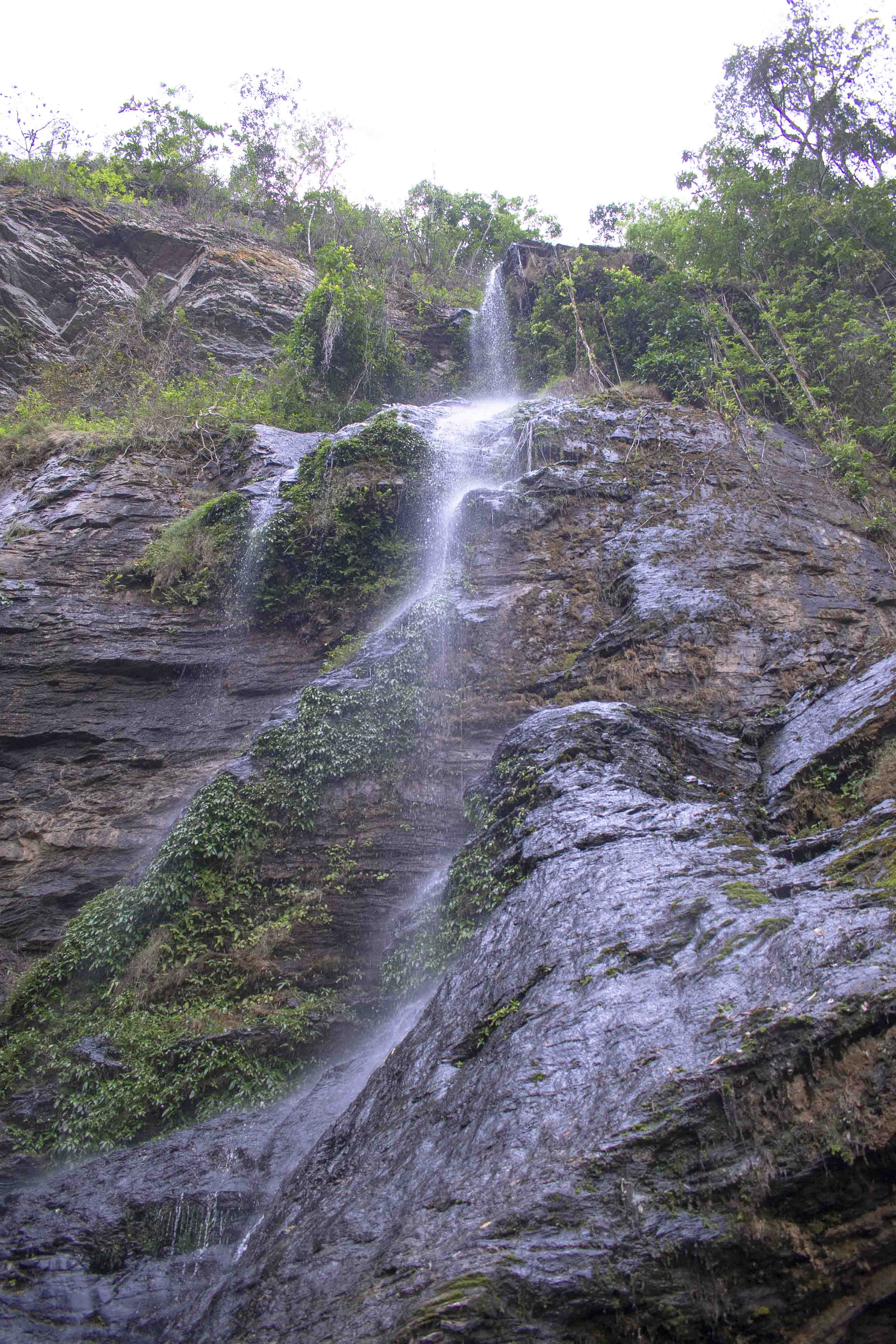
Ote Falls

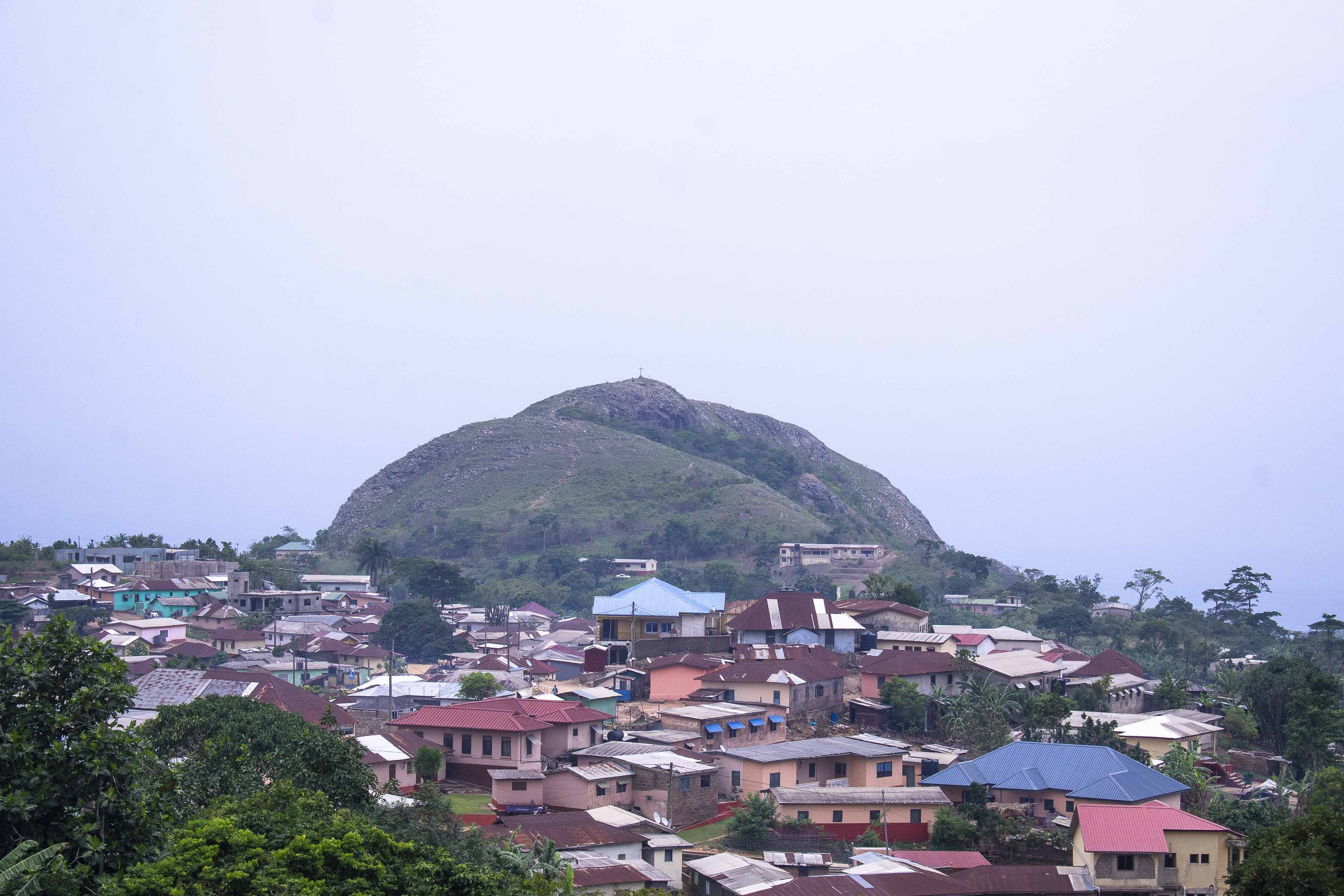
Amedzofe Town Facing the mountain Gemi.jpg

Amedzofe is a settlement north of Ho in the mountainous region of the Ho Municipal District of the Volta Region of Ghana. It is presently located in the newly created Ho-West District Assembly. Amedzofe is a settlement in the mountains, and can boast of four natural gifts: the Ote [otay] Falls, Mount Gemi, the weather and the landscape. It has played a role in the 19th-century Anglo-Ashanti Wars. The Amedzofe Training School was built in 1880 by German missionaries. It is the home of the oldest EP Church in the Avatime Traditional Area that was built in 1889 by the Germans.

It is at an altitude of 677 metres (2,221 ft) above sea level.

== See also ==
- Amedzofe (history) for Amedzofe in Ewe oral history.
