= Orisa Oluwa =

Yoruba deity

Orisa Oluwa is a deity of Yoruba mythology, considered a town protector god.
