= Celestial Church of Christ =

Church founded in Africa by Samuel Oshoffa

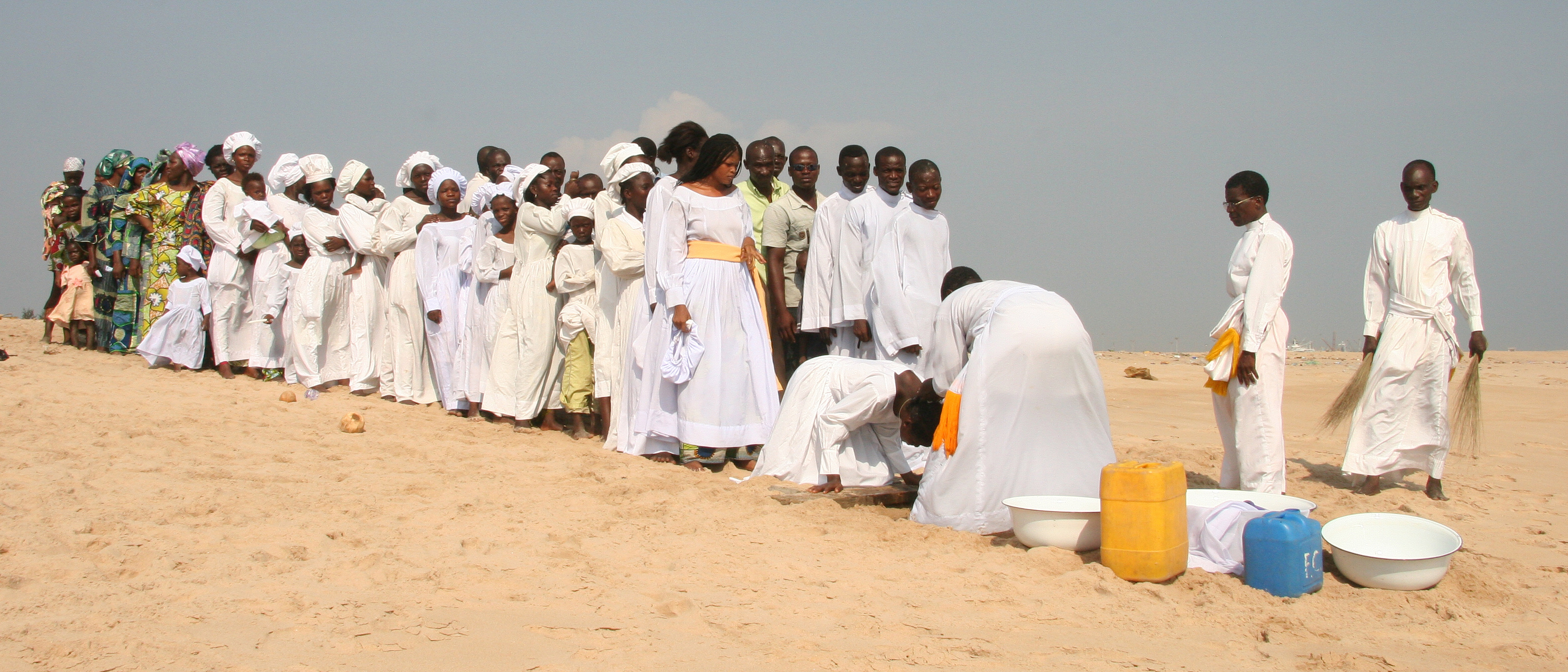
- "Spiritual headwashing" in Cotonou, Benin
- Classification: Protestant
- Orientation: Pentecostal; African-initiated
- Theology: Aladura
- Governance: Rev Emmanuel Mobiyina Oshoffa, Pastor Head, CCC Worldwide (2002–Date)
- Region: Worldwide
- Headquarters: Porto-Novo; Supreme Headquarters: Tchakou Benin; International Headquarters: Mission House, Ketu, Lagos, Nigeria; Holy City: Celestial City Imeko, Ogun State
- Founder: Samuel Oshoffa
- Origin: 29 September 1947; Porto-Novo, Benin
- Official website: Celestial Church of Christ Worldwide

The Celestial Church of Christ (CCC) is a Pentecostal church in the Aladura movement, which was founded by Samuel Oshoffa on 29 September 1947 in Porto-Novo in modern Benin. It has spread from West Africa with the African diaspora in Europe, the United Kingdom, and the United States. The CCC has followers in Benin and Nigeria, particularly in Lagos and Ogun State.

== History ==
Oshoffa was born in French Dahomey (now Benin) in 1909. Raised as a Methodist, he claimed to have had a divine revelation while lost in a forest on 23 May 1947 during a solar eclipse. (The nearest recorded solar eclipse visible in Africa occurred on May 20, not May 23, of that year.) He felt called to pray, to heal the sick, and to raise the dead. He founded his church in September 1947.

Having appointed himself Prophet, Reverend, Pastor, and Founder, he occupied the highest office of his movement. The hegemony he exercised on doctrine and discipline issues made succession difficult when he died in 1985 in Lagos, Nigeria. The CCC was recognized and authorized by the Republic of Dahomey in 1965. From 1976, the church launched an evangelistic campaign in that country, a former colony of French West Africa which gained independence in 1960.

Since the late 1990s, the CCC has used the internet as a means of evangelization, allowing the many existing branches of the church within the African diaspora in the United Kingdom, Germany, Austria, France, the United States and elsewhere to maintain contact with each other and with Nigeria, the nation in which the CCC is currently most popular. The church is also popular in Ivory Coast, where it was headed by Ediémou Blin Jacob until 2026.

The movement has continued to grow since Oshoffa's death after a contentious succession. Oshoffa was succeeded by Alexander Abiodun Adebayo Bada, who was head of the church until his death on 8 September 2000.

Bada was briefly followed as leader by Philip Hunsu Ajose, who died in March 2001. A dispute followed over the succession to Ajose. Some declared Gilbert Oluwatosin Jesse as the new leader, while the majority recognised the Reverend Emmanuel Oshoffa, son of Samuel Oshoffa.

Following Jesse's death, his faction declared that Superior Evangelist Paul Suru Maforikan was the new spiritual leader of the church. Contrary to the procedure of succession in Nigeria, the supreme headquarters in Porto-Novo chose Benoit Agbaossi to head the church. Agbaossi appointed Benoit Adeogun as the next director shortly before his death in 2010.

== Beliefs ==
The CCC is a prophetic Christian church. Its members call themselves "Celestians", and the church is sometimes informally called “Cele”. The formal name of the church is inspired by a vision, in which Jesus said that Church members adore him as do the angels in heaven, and from Deuteronomy 26:15: "Look down from thy Holy habitation, from heaven, and bless thy people Israel and the land which thou hast given us, as thou didst swear to our father, a land flowing with milk and honey".

The church claims inspiration from God through the manifestation of the Holy Spirit among the faithful. Its doctrinal teachings are based on the Bible, and any superstition or animist belief from African traditional religions is excluded, as in other churches in the Aladura movement. The church is governed by twelve major recommendations, consisting of several prohibitions, including food, common to a number of other monotheistic religions. Tobacco, alcohol, and the consumption of pork are forbidden.

Church members wear white one-piece garments during worship, and must not wear their shoes whilst wearing their garments or while within the main church. Men and women are separated at the church. Menstruating women and those who have recently given birth are considered to be "unclean" and must not enter the church building or wear the garment for seven days, after which they are to be "sanctified" by the use of water, candle, sponge and soap with palm fronds.

Members of CCC are forbidden to engage or participate in any form of idolatry, fetish ceremony or cults, black magic and charms. Only men who are "anointed" are allowed access to the altar. Services often use candles and perfumes during prayers. The church uses English language Bibles, as well as Yoruba translated versions.

The church supposedly takes elements from Ogu and Yoruba thought. It also has strong similarities to the "purification movements" against paganism that are relatively common in African Christianity. Oshoffa believed he had a mission to combat "Satan, 'fetish priests' and other 'powers of darkness'" (see Marburg colloquy).

== Imeko Convocation ==
Every December, usually, between the 21st and 24th, the church hosts an international event called the Imeko Convocation. It is mandated that every member of CCC attend as a pilgrim. The CCC believes the event attendance is a mandate made by Oshoffa following his declaration that God had chosen Imeko as the New Jerusalem for the fold.

== Architecture ==
The temples of worship always face east. An altar stand has seven candle holders that represent the seven spirits of Jehovah as represented in Revelation 4:5. The church auditorium also has different rows for male and female seats. On days that services are observed during the week, such as the Wednesday and the Friday services, another altar is made which has three, rather than seven, candles.

== Demographics and reception ==
In 2001, it was the second largest church in Benin by the number of its practitioners with nearly half a million followers. In France, the church is suspected by two anti-cults associations, ADFI and CCMM, of "cultic deviances" and of having committed acts of violence involving the death of a fifteen-year-old minor.

== Bibliography ==
- (in French) Pierre Ndjom, Lumière sur l'Eglise du Christianisme Céleste, Paris (France), 2016, 283 p. ISBN 978-2-9557548-0-1
- (in French) Apollinaire Adetonah, Lumière sur le Christianisme Céleste, 1972, 85 p.
- (in French) Christine Henry, Pierre-Joseph Laurent and André Mary, « Du vin nouveau dans de vieilles outres : parcours d'un dissident du Christianisme Céleste (Bénin) », in Social Compass, 2001, vol. 48, no 3, pp. 353–68
- (in French) Christine Henry, La force des anges : rites, hiérarchie et divination dans le Christianisme Céleste, Bénin, Brepols, Turnhout (Belgique), 2008, 280 p. (ISBN 978-2-503-52889-2)
- (in French) Codjo Hébert Johnson, Le syncrétisme religieux dans le golfe du Bénin : le cas du 'Christianisme céleste' , Université Panthéon-Sorbonne, Paris, 1974, 139 p.
- (in French) Joël Noret, « La place des morts dans le christianisme céleste », in Social compass, 2003, vol. 50, no 4, pp. 493–510
- (in French) Laurent Omonto Ayo Gérémy Ogouby, « L'Église du christianisme céleste », in Les religions dans l'espace public au Bénin: vodoun, christianisme, islam, L'Harmattan, Paris, 2008, pp. 46–48 (ISBN 978-2-296-06111-8)
- (in French) R. Saint-Germain, « Les chrétiens célestes, description d'une Église indépendante africaine: Questions d'éthique en sciences des religions », in Religiologiques (Montréal), 1996, vol. 13, pp. 169–94
- (in French) Codjo Sodokin, Les 'syncrétismes' religieux contemporains et la société béninoise: Le cas du christianisme céleste, Université Lumière, Lyon, 1984, 306 p.
- (in French) Albert de Surgy, L'Église du Christianisme Céleste: Un exemple d'Église prophétique au Bénin, Karthala editions, 2001, 332 p. (ISBN 2845861303)
- (in French) Claude Wauthier, « L'Église du christianisme céleste », in Sectes et prophètes d'Afrique noire, Seuil, Paris, 2007, chapter XV, p. 227 and f. (ISBN 9782020621816)
- Afeosemime U. Adogame, Celestial Church of Christ: the politics of cultural identity in a West African prophetic-charismatic movement, P. Lang, Francfort-sur-le-Main, New York, P. Lang, 1999, 251 p.
- (in English) Edith Oshoffa, The Enigmatic spiritual leader of our time S.B.J. Oshoffa: Celestial Church of Christ Beulah Parish, 1st Edition April 2014, Edith Oshoffa, (ISBN 9789789378692)

== Filmography ==
- (in French) Regard sur le christianisme céleste, documentary film produced by Albert de Surgy, CNRS Audiovisuel, Meudon, 1995, 40' (VHS)
