= Samuel Oshoffa =

Nigerian religious leader (1909–1985)

Samuel Bilewu Oshoffa
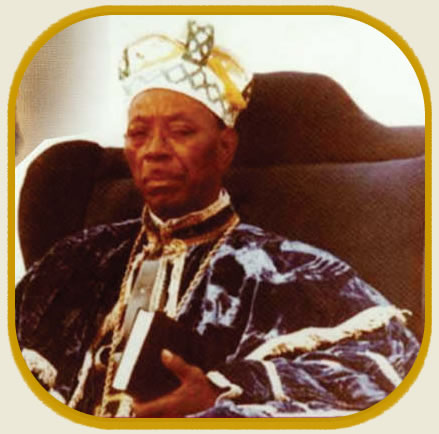
- Born: 11 October 1909; Porto-Novo, French Dahomey
- Died: 10 September 1985 (aged 75); Lagos, Nigeria
- Resting place: Imeko, Ogun State, Nigeria; 7°29′00″N 2°53′00″E
- Occupation: Pastor
- Known for: Founder of the Celestial Church of Christ
- Spouse(s): Felicia Yaman and 13

Samuel Bilewu Joseph Oshoffa (October 11, 1909 – September 10, 1985) was the founder of the Celestial Church of Christ, a Pentecostal church in the Aladura movement. He founded the church in 1947 in Porto-Novo in French Dahomey, now modern Benin. Oshoffa said that he founded the church in response to a "divine order" to evangelize, which was issued to him by an angel of God.

== Early biography ==
Samuel Bilewu Joseph Oshoffa (Ojú kìí ṣe ọfà) was born on October 11, 1909, in the West African city of Porto-Novo, then capital of the colony of French Dahomey (now the country of Benin), into a Yoruba family of mixed religion. His father Joseph Oshoffa was a former Muslim who converted to Methodism. Joseph Oshoffa was a carpenter, which Oshoffa viewed as portentous given that Joseph of Arimathea was also said to be a carpenter. His mother Alake Iyafo was from Imeko Afon in Nigeria and followed African traditional religions; she objected to conventional Christianity. Alake Iyafo left the family when Oshoffa was three months old to join her husband in Nigeria.

== Revelation ==
Oshoffa was working in the ebony trade in 1947 when he claimed that he was instructed by an angel to found a new church. He said that he became lost and had to live off the land for three months before finding his way back to his timber camp, and claimed to have been endowed with the gifts of divine healing and prophecy.

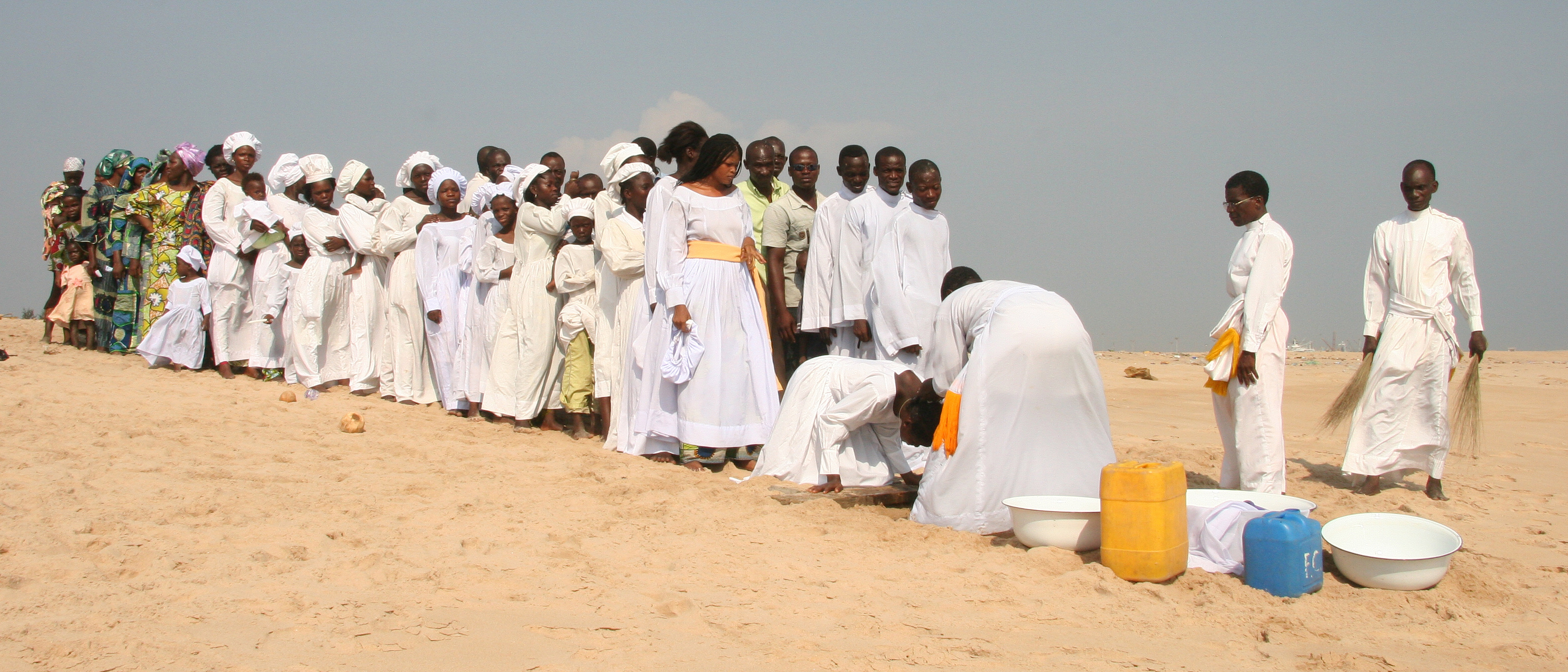
A spiritual purification ceremony in Cotonou in Benin in 2009—100 years after the birth of Oshoffa

An early miracle which his followers attribute to Oshoffa was the resurrection of his nephew. As a result, his sister Elizabeth became the first convert. The nephew became the first prophet of the new church. Oshoffa's followers believe he performed more resurrections.

Oshoffa's first wife Felicia Yaman was involved in the launch of the new church. Followers considered her a prophet.

The church expanded in Benin between 1947 and 1951. In 1976, Oshoffa moved his operations due to a conflict with the government of Benin and a looming arrest. In Nigeria, his followers credited him with curing a "mad" woman. Oshoffa held a public meeting in Yaba, Lagos where he proclaimed his prophecy. In the same year he again claimed a resurrection.

The new church grew rapidly, and it gained followers across West Africa and the world. The church was estimated to have several million followers in 1998. In Nigeria, Oshoffa was sold a large piece of land after the owner was assisted by a "holy man's" intervention in a dream with a legal dispute. The new church faced initial opposition from the Nigerian authorities, but was officially recognised in 1958. He took on two partners for the church, Alexander Abiodun Adebayo Bada and Samuel Ajanlekoko.

== Death, succession, and legacy ==
Oshoffa died seven days after a car accident on September 10, 1985; none of the passengers in his vehicle survived. He is buried in the main church of the Celestial Church of Christ, called Celestial City by followers, in his mother's home region of Imeko Afon in the Ogun State state of Nigeria. He was survived by 34 wives and 150 children.

Oshoffa had been the sole authority of the Celestial Church of Christ; this made for a contested succession after his death. After some confusion, church trustees chose Alexander Abiodun Adebayo Bada as Oshoffa's successor.

In 2009 the Celestial Church of Christ celebrated the 100-year anniversary of Oshoffa's birth with a music festival and award ceremony in Benin.
