= Imeko Afon =

- LGA
- Interactive map of Imeko Afon
- Location in Nigeria
- Coordinates: 7°38′N 2°52′E
- Country: Nigeria
- State: Ogun State
- Headquarter: Imeko

Government
  - Local Government Chairman: HON. THEOPHILUS AREMU OLORODE

Area
  - Total: 1,711.43 km^{2} (660.79 sq mi)

Population (2006 census)
  - Total: 82,217
  - Density: 48.040/km^{2} (124.42/sq mi)
  - Occupation: Predominantly Farmers and Interborder trading
- Time zone: UTC+1 (WAT)
- 3-digit postal code prefix: 111
- ISO 3166 code: NG.OG.IA

Imeko Afon is a Local Government Area in the west of Ogun State, Nigeria bordering the Republic of Benin. Its headquarters are in the town of Imeko at coordinates 7°29′00″N 2°53′00″E.

listed below are the settlements recognized by local government and state authorities:

1. Imeko
2. Ilara
3. Iwoye ketu/Jabata
4. Idofa
5. Afon
6. Owode/Obada
7. Oke Agbede/Moriwi Matale
8. Okuta.

and other small areas like: Oloka, Ijeri, Gbayin, Sagada, Idoshe. Etc

== Location ==
The local Government was created from the old Egbado North Local Government in December 1996, during the military regime of General Sani Abacha. The land area is about 1,711.43 square kilometres (660.79 sq mi). The land is rolling, with small hills rising between 15 and 70 metres above sea level. The Yewa River runs through the area from North to South, with its tributaries, the rivers Oyan and Oha. The LGA is bounded in the north by Oyo State, to the east by the Abeokuta North LGA, to the south by the Yewa North LGA and to the west it shares an international border with Benin. The international border is 93 kilometres (58 mi), and is one of the most accessible stretches of border between the two countries.

The Local Government is divided into ten political wards: Imeko, Afon, Ilara, Iwoye/Jabata, Idofa, Owode/Obada/Idi-Ayin, Moriwi / Matale /Oke-Agbede, Agborogbomo, Atapele and Kajole / Agberiodo. Imeko, the LGA headquarters, is about 30 kilometres (19 mi) by road from Ketou, a major trading town in Benin and the traditional headquarters of the Ketu Yoruba people. The second largest settlement, Ilara, has its traditional land extended across the international border into Benin; making the commercial town have parts in both countries, so there is Ilara Nigeria and "Ilara" Benin Republic (popularly called 'Kanga')

== People ==
The 1991 population census gave a population of about 118,339. The people are mostly Yorubas belonging to the Ketu subgroup, but there are significant numbers of Ohori and Egun speaking people. As a border community, other West African people live in the LGA, including a substantial number of Fulani nomads who came into the area in search of pastures. There are natives of Egbado Yoruba tribe too.

The other West African people living among the natives primarily came as palm wine tappers and local gin distillers, farm workers and few of them are artisans. All these west African people maintain close tie with their homeland and regard this area as their second home.

== Economy ==
Farming is the main economic activity. The vegetation is a mixture of savannah belt and sparse forest suitable for cattle raising, with the advantage of being free of Tse-tse flies. The climate is tropical, with a rainy season commencing around March and ending in November. The soil is fertile, and cassava and tomatoes are grown in large quantities. Cotton grown in the LGA supplies the Yaru, tread and textile industries in Benin Republic. Other crops are pepper, maize, groundnuts, yams, vegetables, cocoa, cashew and teak.

The LGA has 68 public primary schools (excluding yet to be absorbed community schools) and 12 public secondary schools, and a good number of nursery, primary and secondary private schools. Tourist attractions include Celestial City, center of the Celestial Church of Christ, Imeko, Odo-Osuruu waterfalls, Mount Boomu, Afon and Jabata Forest. To encourage tourists, the LGA is named the "virgin land", and in 2010 a 20-kilometre (12 mi) Imeko-Oke-Agbede-Iwoye road was being built, now needing reconstruction.
