= List of rulers of the Fon state of Alada =

== Rulers of the Kingdom of Allada ==
This is a chronological list of rulers of the Kingdom of Allada, also known as Ardrah (Ardra), Ardrah Empire, Adja-Tado. and known to the French as Allada or Ardres. Named for its capital, the modern Allada, which was also the main city and major port of the realm the territory is located in present-day Benin.

The city and kingdom were supposedly founded by a group of Aja migrants from Tado, a settlement along the Mono River, in the 12th or 13th century. Its kings "ruled with the consent of the elders of the people".

While historically a sovereign kingdom, in present times the monarchy continues to exist as a non-sovereign monarchy within the republic of Benin

(Dates in italics indicate de facto continuation of office)

Ajahutonon (Alada hosu) = King

| Tenure | Incumbent | Notes |
|---|---|---|
Agasuvi Dynasty (Alada-tadonu Dynasty)
| c. 1550 | Foundation of the Alada kingdom by emigrants from Tado | |
| c. 1440 | Aholuho Adja, Ajahutonon | |
| c. 1445 | De Nufion, Ajahutonon | |
| c. 1458 to ???? | Dassu, Ajahutonon | |
| c. 1470 | Dassa, Ajahutonon | |
| c. 1475 | Adjakpa, Ajahutonon | |
| c. 1490 | Yessu, Ajahutonon | |
| c. 1495 | Azoton, Ajahutonon | |
| c. 1498 | Yessu, Ajahutonon | |
| c. 1510 | Akonde, Ajahutonon | |
| c. 1520 | Amamu, Ajahutonon | |
| c. 1530 | Agagnon, Ajahutonon | |
| c. 1540 | Agbangba, Ajahutonon | |
| c. 1550 | Hueze, Ajahutonon | |
| c. 1560 | Agbande, Ajahutonon | |
| c. 1580 | Kin-Ha, Ajahutonon | |
| c. 1585 | Mindji, Ajahutonon | |
| c. 1587 to c. 1590 | Akoli, Ajahutonon | |
| c. 1590 to 1610 | Kopon, Ajahutonon | First historical king |
| 1610 to ???? | Hunungungu, Ajahutonon | |
| ???? to c. 1660 | Lamadje Pokonu, Ajahutonon | |
| c. 1660 to ???? | Tezifon, Ajahutonon | |
| ???? to ???? | gBagwe, Ajahutonon | |
| ???? to March 1724 | De Adjara, Ajahutonon | |
| March 1724 | Conquest by Danhome | |
| March 1724 to 1742 | Direct rule by Abomey Kingdom | |
| 1734 | Institution of royalty subordinated to Danhome | |
| 1732 to 1746 | Mijo, Ajahutonon | |
| 1746 to 1765 | Deka, Ajahutonon | |
| 1765 to 1817 | Ganhwa, Ajahutonon | (See below) |
| 1817 to 1877 | Sindje, Ajahutonon | |
| 1879 to 4 February 1894 | Gi-gla No-Don Gbé-non Mau, Ajahutonon | |
| 1894 | Re-establishment of the Kingdom by France | |
| 4 February 1894 to c. 1898 | Gi-gla Gunhu-Hugnon, Ajahutonon | |
| c.1898 to 1909 | Djihento, Ajahutonon | |
| 1909 | French annexation | |
| 1909 to 15 December 1923 | Djihento, Chef supérieur | |
| 1923 to 1954 | Kanfon, Chef supérieur | |
| 1954 to 19?? | Gi-gla II, Chef supérieur | |
| 2 December 1992 to present | Kpodégbé Djigla, King | |

== Sources ==
- http://www.rulers.org/benitrad.html
- African States and Rulers, John Stewart, McFarland

== See also ==
- Benin
- Fon people
- King of Dahomey
- List of rulers of the Fon state of Savi Hweda
- Lists of office-holders
