= Aja people =

Ethnic group of Benin and southeast Togo

Aja
Total population
- 1,280,000

Regions with significant populations
- Benin: 1,090,000
- Togo: 190,000

Languages
- Adja, French

Religion
- West African Vodun, Christianity

Related ethnic groups
- Other Gbe peoples, primarily Ewe and Fon

The Aja or Adja are an ethnic group native to south-western Benin and south-eastern Togo. According to oral tradition, the Aja migrated to southern Benin in the 12th or 13th century from Tado on the Mono River, and c. 1600, three brothers, Kokpon, Do-Aklin, and Te-Agbanlin, split the ruling of the region then occupied by the Aja amongst themselves: Kokpon took the capital city of Great Ardra, reigning over the Allada kingdom; Do-Aklin founded Abomey, which would become capital of the Kingdom of Dahomey; and Te-Agbanlin founded Little Ardra, also known as Ajatche, later called Porto-Novo (lit. 'new port') by Portuguese traders and the current capital city of Benin. The Aja speak a language known as Aja-Gbe, or simply "Aja". Only 1–5% are literate in their native tongue. According to one source, vodún originated from the Aja.

== History ==
The ancestors of the Aja people migrated westward from the Niger-Benue confluence, which is the urheimat of the Volta-Niger speakers, sometime before the 11th century CE. They then established the Kingdom of Tado around the year 1000, which became the most powerful kingdom in what is now southern Togo. The kingdom flourished and extended its cultural influence over an increasingly vast territory until the 19th century. During its golden age, roughly between the 15th and 17th centuries, the Aja Kingdom of Tado functioned as a confederation—effectively an empire—covering an area stretching from the Volta River to the Kouffo River, and from the coast to Agbonou (modern Atakpamé) and Kambolé (Tchamba). The Spanish Jesuit Alonso de Sandoval described it in 1627 as "a powerful kingdom extending over a vast inland territory with a coastal zone containing a safe port, governed by a black ruler called Eminence." This territory was ruled by the Anyigbãfio (Kings of the Land).

Most Gbe-speaking people, especially the Ewe and Fon, trace their origins to Aja-Tado (formerly known as Azame) and consider Aja as their 'mother tribe'. The Aja living on the Abomey Plateau mingled with and absorbed the local people, namely a Yoruba subgroup they called the Gedevi (Gede/Igede - Not to be confused with the Igede from the modern North-Central region of Nigeria) and founded the city of Abomey, thus creating a new people known as the Fon, or "Dahomey" ethnic group. This group is now the largest in Benin. Another source claims the Aja were the rulers of Dahomey (Benin) until 1893, when the French conquered them. Some of them who defected from the Aja kingdom over political issues and migrated southwards and westwards became the Ewe people in modern Togo and Ghana, now the largest Gbe ethnic group. Currently, there are approximately 2,000,000 Ajas in an area straddling the border between Benin and Togo, 50 kilometres (30 miles) long and 30 km (20 mi) wide.

Archaeological evidence indicates human habitation in the region since before Neolithic times. Scholars Oliver Davies and Paul Ozanne suggest that the Aja-Ewe area (southern Togo, southwestern Benin, and southeastern Ghana) "has been continuously occupied since approximately 3700 BCE." The earliest known inhabitants were the Akpafu ironworkers in present-day Ghana and the Alu people of Tado. According to researcher Roberto Pazzi, the Alu likely represented an eastward extension of this archaic Akpafu settlement. Though the Alu have since lost the knowledge of iron smelting, they appear to have been skilled ironworkers in antiquity. Evidence includes widespread ironworking slag throughout the region, a large mound of industrial waste at the western edge of Tado village, and the 1970 discovery of a blast furnace during excavations for a church bell tower in Tado's Domé quarter.

Beyond these metallurgical remains, little is known about Alu society. They likely supplemented ironworking with hunting, fishing, and subsistence agriculture. According to Alu oral tradition, they originated near the source of the Mono River, close to the Kora River in northern Togo—an area rich in iron deposits and known for blacksmithing. Upon arriving in the region, the Alu reportedly encountered the Agɛ or Aziza, described in their traditions as "forest spirits: small people, the tallest reaching the height of 12 to 14-year-old children. They have reddish skin, smooth, straight hair falling over their faces, and move swiftly through the forest." This description corresponds to Pygmy or West African Hunter-Gatherer populations, who may have been displaced or killed by incoming groups from the north.

Around the beginning of the second millennium, the Alu were joined by communities arriving from the northwest. Pazzi suggests these newcomers originated from the Za (Gao) kingdom, a Sudanese state in the Niger bend region. Facing Berber invasions around 1010 CE after a prosperous period dominating the area between Timbuktu and Djenné, the Aza people dispersed. One group traveled south through the Guinean forest, eventually settling with the Alu in a village called Azamé—the original name of Tado.

According to some Tado elders, the ancestor of the Azanu clan was reportedly the brother of the founder of the Kumasi kingdom. This claim finds support in shared sociocultural elements between Kumasi and Tado that differ from the traditions of Ife-derived peoples. These include identical seven-day week cycles and corresponding names for children born on particular days (Kɔjo, Kɔmlã, Kuaku). Additionally, upon the death of a Tado king, nothing could proceed without approval from the Kumasi king. Both kingdoms also shared a five-legged stool as the foundational symbol of royal authority. These elements appear to have existed among certain Songhai groups in the Niger bend before their Islamization, suggesting possible Songhai cultural origins for the Tado royal family.

The most significant population movement occurred around the 13th century with the arrival of Aja migrants from the east. These newcomers would eventually lend their name to both the ethnic group and the city, which changed from Azamé to Tado. Some traditions trace their origins to the Nile Valley, passing through Oyo in Nigeria and Kétou in Benin, with some traditions even claiming descent from biblical locations such as Babel. However, it is more likely that they migrated from the area around the west banks of the Niger River in modern Nigeria. While their exact numbers remain unknown, they likely arrived in substantial waves seeking security and prosperity under a leader named Togbui-Anyi. Their arrival fundamentally transformed the region.

Azamé, now called Tado, grew into a major city. Its prosperity attracted the envy of neighbors, particularly Oyo, prompting the construction of defensive walls. The three communities—Alu, Za (Gao), and Aja-Ewe—merged to form the Aja people and the powerful Kingdom of Tado, which extended its cultural influence until the 19th century. At its zenith (15th-17th centuries), the Aja Kingdom of Tado was effectively a confederation spanning from the Volta to the Kouffo and from the coast to Agbonou and Kambolé. The Anyigbãfio ruled over those migrants who had left the ancestral city at various times to settle surrounding regions.

Scarcity of natural resources, overpopulation, and chieftaincy disputes contributed to the separation and dispersal of both the Ewe and later the Fon from Adja. The Awormezi ( the paramount stool) of Anlo in the Volta Region of Ghana is reputed to be the original stool of Adja Tado and was taken away by Torgbui Sri (a prince) to Notsie when succession disputes arose among the claimants of the stool after the death of the occupant. An outbreak of smallpox decimated the Adja population in ancient times, thus reducing their population in comparison to the descendant Ewe or Fon. There are three dialects: Tàgóbé (in Togo only), Dògóbè (in Benin only), and Hwègbè (in both countries). Many are trilingual, also speaking French and Fongbe, the lingua-franca of southern Benin, while Ewe is spoken as a second language by those Aja living in Togo and Ghana.

The modern Aja ethnic group comprises several communities that settled in the region: the Alu, the Azanu (or Za), and the Aja-Ewe. The Alu represent the earliest known inhabitants, present in the region during the first millennium. Their origins remain uncertain; Alu elders maintain that their ancestor Eyru descended from heaven carrying a hammer and anvil, symbolizing ironworking. Along with the Akpafu people at the confluence of the Black and White Volta rivers, they constitute what historians term the region's primitive settlement. The formation of the Aja ethnicity resulted from the convergence of three tribal groups: the Alu, the Azanu, and the Aja. The first two may have Guãŋ origins, while the Aja might have Yoruba origins. The Aja language may have developed as a dialectal derivative of a Guãŋ language before the Yoruba arrival, which could explain significant differences between Yoruba and Aja and also explain the minor amount of shared cognates they have.

Due to severe land shortages in the densely populated Togolese-Beninois border region mentioned above, many Aja have migrated in recent years, seeking arable land for subsistence farming or work in urban centers. There are a significant number of Aja living throughout the coastal region of Benin and Togo, southern Nigeria and Gabon. The urban centers of Cotonou, Lome, Lagos and Libreville all have significant Aja migrant populations.

The Aja kingdom of Allada was conquered by Dahomey in 1724. This resulted in thousands of Aja people, soldiers & civilians, being slaughtered by the invading Dahomean army. In the aftermath, Dahomey sold about 8000 Aja captives into slavery in the New World. Many of these slaves disembarked in Haiti, including the parents of the revolutionary leader Toussaint Louverture.

The Aja, Fon, Ewe, and Ga-Adangbe accounted for most of the people carried to the Americas from the Bight of Benin, Togo and Ghana in the transatlantic slave trade prior to the late eighteenth century. After this period, Yoruba people became the more commonly exported captives from the region.

== Etymology ==
The name "Aja" itself may derive from the Yoruba term "alejɔ" (stranger/guest) or "oba aledjo" (foreign patriarch). According to Porto-Novo tradition, among the Yoruba who settled at Tado was a man possessing magical powers who saved the city from a smallpox epidemic. This earned him the esteem of Aholõhu, chief of the Azanu tribe, who granted him his daughter in marriage. Aholõhu subsequently disinherited his sons in favor of his daughter and her Yoruba husband, Ijɛbu Adimola. After undergoing rituals to purify the foreign blood in his veins, he was made king—in Yoruba, "Oba Aledjo"—and the name evolved into "Aja."
