= List of rulers of the Fon state of Savi Hweda =

Territory located in present-day Benin. The Kingdom of Whydah was founded in c. 1580 by refugees from Allada. From 1727 the kingdom was subjected by the kingdom of Dahomey and ruled through a governor in collaboration with the Whydah king. On 30 November 1891, Whydah was under a French protectorate, effective from 3 December 1892. In 1894 it became part of the colony of French Dahomey.

English: Whydah; French: Ouidah

(Dates in italics indicate de facto continuation of office)

Most information in the table below is taken from John Stewart's African States and Rulers (Third edition, 2006) except where referenced from a different source.

Tenure	Incumbent	Notes
Kings of Whydah
c. 1580 – c. 1620	Haholo	
c. 1620 – c. 1640	Kpassé	
c. 1640 – ?	?	
? – c. 1669	?	
c. 1669 – c. 1690	Ayohuan	
c. 1690 – 1703	Agbangia	
1703 – 1708	Amah	Also known as Aysan.
1708 – February 1727	Huffon	
Nominal Kings of Whydah under Dahomey rule
February 1727 – 1741	Huffon	
1741 – ?	?	
1753 – December 1774	Sagbe	
December 1774 – 1775	Agbamy	
1776 – 1802	Akanmou	
1804 – 1819	Dèkpon	
1820 – 1843	Dèdé	
1844 – 1857	Dèdji	
Dahomey Governors
February 1727 – 1744	Dassu	
1744 – c. 1765	Dedele	
c. 1765 – ?	Sekplon	
? – ?	Bassoh	
? – c. 1868	?	
Kings of Whydah (restored)
c. 1868 – 1879	Adjossogbé	
1879 – c. 1882	Zinhummé	
c. 1882 – c. 1884	Seklocka	
c. 1884 – c. 1887	Aguessi Dagba	
c. 1887 – c. 1890	Jagba	
c. 1890 – 1898	Nugbododhone	
1898 – 2006	Interregenum	
2006 – present	Mitodaho Kpassenhon	

== Sources ==
- http://www.rulers.org/benitrad.html
- https://www.worldstatesmen.org/Benin_native.html

== See also ==
- Benin
- Fon people
- List of rulers of the Fon state of Alada
- Lists of office-holders
