= Kingdom of Ardra =

Former kingdom in present-day Benin

Coordinates: 6°39′N 2°09′E

- 12th/13th century–1724
- Capital: Allada
- Ethnic groups: Aja
- Government: Monarchy
- King of Ardra
- History
  - Established: 12th/13th century
  - Conquered by Dahomey: 1724

Population
  - 16th century: ~200,000
Succeeded by
Kingdom of Dahomey
- Today part of: Benin

The Kingdom of Ardra, also known as the Kingdom of Allada, was a coastal West African kingdom in southern Benin. While historically a sovereign kingdom, in present times the monarchy continues to exist as a non-sovereign monarchy within the republic of Benin.

It was named for its capital, the modern Allada, which was also the main city and major port of the realm.

The city and kingdom were supposedly founded by a group of Aja migrants from Tado, a settlement along the Mono River, in the 12th or 13th century. Its kings "ruled with the consent of the elders of the people". The state reached the peak of its power in the 16th and early 17th centuries, when it was an important source of slaves for the Atlantic trade. By the mid-15th century, the city of Allada had a population of approximately 30,000 people, while the state as a whole had a population of nearly 200,000 people by the 16th century.

== Name ==
The name is variously spelled Ardra, Ardrah, Ardres, Hardre, Arda, Arada, and Arrada. It is also sometimes known by its capital's present-day name Allada.

== Foundational legend ==
According to the Fon oral tradition, the Aja settlers that established themselves in the area of present-day Allada arrived in southern Benin around the 12th or 13th century coming from Tado, on the Mono River. They established themselves in the area that currently corresponds to southern Benin, until c. 1600, when three brothers — Kokpon, Do-Aklin, and Te-Agbanlin — split the rule of the region amongst themselves: Kokpon took the capital city of Great Ardra, reigning over the Allada Kingdom, while his brother Do-Aklin founded Abomey (which would become capital of the Kingdom of Dahomey) and their brother Te-Agbanlin founded Little Ardra, also known as Ajatche, later called Porto Novo (literally, "New Port") by Portuguese traders (which is the current capital city of Benin).

== History ==
Founded by Aja settlers, the settlement of Allada was in 1600 the most prominent of Aja states, bordering the nearby Oyo Empire, to which the King of Allada was vassal and tributary. Although it was an inland kingdom, Allada maintained control of some sea ports such as Offra, Jaquin and Whydah, thus making Allada important in the growing slave trade business, which also granted Allada the economic means to pay its duties to Oyo. Between 1640 and 1690, about 125,000 slaves were sold from Allada, peaking at about 55,000 during the 1680s alone.

Originally a part of the Allada Kingdom, the city of Abomey went on to become capital of a new kingdom, the Kingdom of Dahomey, which grew strong enough to challenge the nearby Oyo Kingdom, with Dahomey finally vanquishing it and establishing itself as the main kingdom in the region.

In the early 17th century, a succession dispute led to emigration out of Allada. By the late 1690s, the growth of Dahomey had severely restricted Allada's supply of slaves from the north, while simultaneously Whydah surpassed Allada as a primary source of slaves from West Africa. This greatly weakened Allada's comparative power in the region. In 1724, Dahomey invaded Allada; in three days, the King of Dahomey's troops slaughtered thousands of Allada's warriors and citizens. In the aftermath, more than 8,000 of Allada's population (mostly Aja people) were captured and sold into slavery in the New World.

=== Modern history ===
Following Dahomey's subjugation of the kingdom, in 1724, Dahomey permitted the existence of a subordinate royalty. In 1894, France re-established the kingdom under its control. In 1904, the kingdom was annexed by France, however it was allowed to continue to exist as a non-sovereign monarchy with its leaders being referred to as "chef supérieur". The title of "king" was re-established in 1992 upon the coronation of Kpodégbé Togi Djigla, and the non-sovereign monarchy continues to this day.

Kpodégbé Toyi Djigla is leader of the High Council of Kings of Benin.

The modern non-sovereign kingdom of Ardra also consists of numerous minor kings who, in theory, accept the king of Ardra as their superior.

== Military ==
In 1785, Ardra built a ditch along with a clay wall around the state for protection against opponents beyond its borders. Thornton adds that the capital of Ardra was also fortified in the 1790s with a ditch and a wall which contained loopholes. Special buildings containing loopholes were prominent across the capital. Since the 18th century, the Ardra navy deployed light artillery on its vessels. This innovation was introduced by Antonio Vaz de Coelho, a former African slave from Brazil. According to Thornton, the navy possessed 2 armed boats in an operation against Epe in 1778. The 2 boats were each mounted with 4 brass swivel guns as well as 24 large calibre blunderbusses. The main purpose of the armed boats was to provide cover for Ardra's army as it retreated.

In the 18th century, the subordinate dynasty put in place by Dahomey following its conquest of the state, provided infantry and naval support to Dahomey. Primary sources from the 1690s state that Ardra's army moved in companies only during parades as they fought in loose formations on the battlefield. Sieur d'Elbee documented the use of spears, shields, swords and muskets by the army during a military parade in 1670.

== Seaside fort ==
Slaves used to be captured from enemy states and passed on to European slavers bound for the Americas, the route which by repute the father of Toussaint L'Ouverture, the famous general that lead the slave rebellion of the Haitian revolution that lead Jean-Jacques Dessalines to establish the Empire of Haiti, had taken.

== Connection to Toussaint L'Ouverture ==
According to the Toussaint Louverture Historical Society, Toussaint L'Ouverture, the Haitian revolutionary and first Black governor of Saint-Domingue, was a direct descendant of Gaou Guinou, the heir – either son or brother – of the King of Allada killed during the invasion by the Kingdom of Dahomey in 1724.

To quote from their sources, "Gaou Guinou, Minister of War and younger brother of the King of Allada, rather than succeeding to his father and ascending naturally to the throne, chose then to accompany his vanquished soldiers in exile. He was given a hammock on board of a slave ship" that sailed to the island of Hispaniola, where the slaves were sold in Haiti.

== List of kings of Ardra ==
Names and dates taken from John Stewart's African States and Rulers (1989).

King	Reign Dates	Comments
Ayossoh Aholuho Adja	c. 1440–1445	Adé Gonoū gbétô 1er Agonmin Yéwa
De Nufion	c. 1445–1450	
Djidomingba	c. 1450–1458	
Dassu	c. 1458–1470	
Dassa	c. 1470–1475	
Adjakpa Djaka-dogbo	c. 1475–1490	Djaka Dògbó
Yessu	c. 1490–1495	
Azoton	c. 1495–1498	
Yessu	c. 1498–1510	
Akonde	c. 1510–1520	
Amamu	c. 1520–1530	
Agagnon	c. 1530–1540	Agonmin
Agbangba	c. 1540–1550	
Hueze	c. 1550–1560	
Agbande	c. 1560–1580	
Kin-Ha	c. 1580–1585	
Mindji	c. 1585–1587	
Akolu	c. 1587–1590	
Kopon	c. 1590–1610	First historical king.
Hunungungu	c. 1610–?	
Lamadje Pokonu	?–c. 1660	
Tezifon	c. 1660–?	
gBagwe Amar agomê-yewa	c.1620–1703	
De Adjara	?–March 1724	
Dè-Houffon–Agonmin	March 1724–1742	Under rule of Abomey.
Mijo	1742–?	
Tê-Agonmin yewa	?–1845	
Deka	1845–?	
Ganhwa	?	
Gangia Sindje	?–1879	
Gi-gla No-Done Gbé-non Mau	1879–4 February 1894	
Gi-gla Gunhu-Hugnon	4 February 1894–c. 1898	Under French rule.
Djihento	c. 1898–15 December 1923	Under French rule.
Gi-gla II	1954–c. 1991	Modern post-independence of Benin rulers of Arda.
Kpodégbé Togi Djigla	1992–present	Modern post-independence of Benin rulers of Arda.
