= Kandji =

Kandji is a surname of African origin. Notable people with the surname include:

- Dada Agonlinhossou Yèto Kandji, the 5th king of the Kingdom of Agonlin
- Itah Kandji-Murangi, Namibian politician
- Macoumba Kandji (born 1985), Senegalese professional footballer
- Sangoné Kandji (born 1992), Senegalese triple jumper and former long jumper

== See also ==
- Kandji (company), an American software company
