= Gaou Guinou =

African prince

Gaou Guinou (1698–unknown) was an African prince of Allada in the Kingdom of Allada, and was claimed to be the grandfather of Toussaint Louverture, the leader of the Haitian Revolution. He may have been in the royal family of Allada as well as a member of the Fon people. In Abomey, Hussar allied with King Agaja of Dahomey. Agaja invaded and conquered Allada in 1724. According to the autobiography of L’Ouverture, Gaou Guinou was born around the year 1698 and lived to be over 106 years old.

According to Haitian oral traditions, Gaou Guinou's father, Soso, died in 1724 and left two sons to fight for the succession: Hussar and Gaou Guinou. Hussar fled to Abomey while Gaou Guinou, the younger brother, took power of Great Ardra. Hussar allied with the ruler of Dahomey, a neighboring kingdom, and captured Gaou Guinou during the conflict, rather being executed, he was sold into slavery along with his wife Catherine Affiba, and two children, Genevieve and Augustin, were captured along with him. The family, including Gaou Guinou, his second wife Pauline, and their children including Hyppolite, were sold and shipped to the French colony of Saint-Domingue (present-day Haiti), where they ended up on the Bréda plantation near Cap-Français. After arriving in the New World, Gaou Guinou was baptized as Hyppolite and given special treatment on the Bréda plantation due to his status as a former royal. With his second wife, Pauline, who was from the Aja ethnic group, Gaou Guinou fathered several other children, including François Dominique Toussaint Louverture who was born in Bréda in 1743. Upon arrival in Saint-Domingue, Gaou Guinou and his wife were separated and placed on different estates. Gaou Guinou was sent to a plantation owned by the Comte de Noé. His wife was granted to a Mr. De La Fontaine. Gaou Guinou is believed to be the grandfather of Toussaint Louverture, a former slave who led the Haitian Revolution against French colonial rule.

Guinou is said to have eventually arrived in Saint-Domingue where he is believed to have started the family of Toussaint Louverture while still enslaved, enjoying some privileges such as being allocated land and the labor of five enslaved people to work it. Guinou may have lived to be over 106 years old, while this would mean he was alive, when Saint-Domingue gained its independence from France on New Year's Day 1804 and rename it as "Ayiti", the very first free black-led republic in the New World (Americas).
