= Agonli-Houégbo =

Coordinates: 7.2529°N 2.4140°E

- Arrondissement
- Interactive map of Agonli-Houégbo
- Country: Benin
- Department: Zou Department
- Commune: Zagnanado

Population (2002)
  - Total: 4,437
- Time zone: UTC+1 (WAT)

Agonli-Houégbo is an arrondissement in the Zou department of Benin. It is an administrative division under the jurisdiction of the commune of Zagnanado. According to the population census conducted by the Institut National de la Statistique Benin on February 15, 2002, the arrondissement had a total population of 4,437.

The royal residence of the non-sovereign Kingdom of Agonlin, led by Dada Agonlinhossou Yèto Kandji since 1993, is located here. Vodun is practiced in the area, with the deity Sanligan being considered particularly important.
