= Synodontis ouemeensis =

Conservation status
- Least Concern (IUCN 3.1)

Scientific classification
- Kingdom: Animalia
- Phylum: Chordata
- Class: Actinopterygii
- Order: Siluriformes
- Family: Mochokidae
- Genus: Synodontis
- Species: S. ouemeensis

Binomial name
- Synodontis ouemeensis Musschoot & Lalèyè, 2008

Species of fish

Synodontis ouemeensis is a species of upside-down catfish native to the Ogun, Ouémé and Mono river basins of Nigeria, Benin and Togo. This species grows to a length of 15 centimetres (5.9 in) SL.
