= Tado =

- Location in Togo
- Coordinates: 7°09′N 1°35′E
- Country: Togo

Tado (formerly Ezame) is a historical village in southeast Togo, alongside the Mono River, near the border with Benin, in between Notsé in the center south of Togo and Abomey in Benin, two cities connected to its history. Tado is the former royal city of the Kingdom of Tado, one of the oldest, longest-standing and most powerful kingdoms of south west Africa. Tado is the birthplace of many west African tribes, civilisations, cultures, kingdoms and bloodlines that have spread across Togo, Benin, Ghana, Ivory Coast and Nigeria, through a kingdom that lasted over 900 years.

== History ==
Ezame is recorded as the village that gave birth to the royal city of Tado and its many tribes, civilisations and cultures. Eza is the name of a local tree, and Ezame means "to be implanted inside the Eza trees". In the Kingdom of Tado ruled the "Anyigbãfio" which translates to the "Kings of the Earth" in the Aja language.

The Aja are natives to south-eastern Togo and western Benin and one of Africa's oldest and royal communities. The Aja have been living in West Africa since neolithic times (10 000 BC to 2 000 BC), and remained unaffected by external influences from 3700 BC until the arrival of the Phoenicians and Pharaoh Necho in 600 BC.

Alongside the Aja were the Ewé, whom share both similar and Yorùbá ancestries. The Ewé are also one of Togo's most symbolic tribes, with thousands of years of history, rich in complexity, diversity, culture and influence across all African coastal countries through the many languages and dialects they created. Before 1000 AC, the Ewé moved from Ketou located in the Yorùbá country (South and east of Nigeria and east of Benin) to establish themselves in Ezame.

Around 1000 AC, the village of Ezame suffered from famine, sickness and drought until the arrival of Tobgui-anyi, the saviour who healed the village and its people. He was made King and renamed the village to the name of Tado, the royal city of the Kingdom, that gave birth to the princes of Dahomey, Notsé, Allada and Adjatché. It is the birthplace of Gangnihessou, the first king of Dahomey, in the 16th century. The Awomefia stool of Anlo in Ghana is reputed to be the original royal stool of Tado that was taken away during a succession dispute.

From the 13th century, the Péda (also written Pedah/Xwla/Xweda/Pla), renown farmers, fishermen and salt merchants, descendants of the Aja, migrated from the Kingdom of Tado to establish themselves further down the coast around "Xwlavixo", first renamed "Little Popo" before adopting the name of "Aného". They created the Popo Kingdom (themselves renamed "Popo" by the arriving Portuguese slave merchants, precursors to the Transatlantic Slave trade that transformed Aného into one of the most pivotal ports of the Slave Coast during the Genocide of Africa) that included Great Popo, in Benin, and the town of Aghwey.

During its golden age from the 15th to the 17th century, it covered a space from the Volta Region of Ghana, through Agbonou (Atakpamé) in central Togo and up north in Kambolé (Tchamba), into the Couffo region of Benin and all the way to Gbadagli (Badagry) which stands at the borders of Nigeria, and included many coastal cities such as Aného, Accra or Adjatché (now called Porto Novo, Benin's capital).

From the Aja of Tado came the Fons, who migrated to establish three Kingdoms of their own. First, the Kingdom of Ardra, from 1100 until 1724. The settlement of Allada was the most prominent of Aja states around 1600, bordering the nearby Oyo Empire (Nigeria), to which the King of Allada was vassal and tributary. Allada maintained control of some sea ports such as Offra, Jaquin and Whydah. Originally a part of the Allada Kingdom, the city of Abomey went on to become capital of the Kingdom of Dahomey. Royalty was re-established in 1894 under French colonisation but only saw the return of its King and his title in 1992 during the coronation of Kpodégbé Togi Djigla, as the 16th King of the Fon state. Secondly, the Kingdom of Abomey that lasted from 1600 until 1904. A series of succession wars lead to the foundation of two kingdoms. First known as Abomey, the Kingdom of Dahomey eventually went on to subjugate the Kingdom of Ardra in 1724. The city of Abomey grew strong enough to challenge the nearby Oyo Kingdom, with Dahomey finally vanquishing it, and establishing itself as the main kingdom in the region. The name "Dahomey" originates from a European transcription that was noted to be most likely wrong. Thirdly, the Kingdom of Adjatché from 1600, from where Little Ardra was founded which went on to become Porto Novo, Benin's capital.

The Ewé further split during the exodus of Ewé from Notsé from 1700 to 1750 into four groups: the Ewé, the Anlo, the Ouatchi and the Agomé. It is from the Ewé language that the name "Togo" became the name of this land during the German Protectorate "Togoland". In Ewé, Togo means "The Land Beyond The Sea" and name that became official on the 27th April 1960 as the Togolese Republic.

The Anlo originally went to the east of Volta, a river in the gulf of Guinea, and are now 6 million spread across southern Togo, southern Benin, southwest Nigeria, and the south-eastern parts of the Volta Region of Ghana.

Today the Aja populate the south part of Togo and Benin.

Tado is a centre of pilgrimage for Aja and other Gbe people from across the region, who visit the village each August to pray for their ancestral spirits.

== See also ==
- Gbe languages, History section
