= Djigla =

Djigla is a surname. Notable people with the surname include:

- David Djigla (born 1995), Beninese footballer
- Kpodégbé Djigla, Beninese king
