= High Council of Kings of Benin =

Advocacy group

The High Council of Kings of Benin (French: Haut Conseil des rois du Bénin), sometimes simply referred to as the High Council of Kings (French: Haut Conseil des Rois) or HCRB, is a non-governmental organisation that represents the various non-sovereign monarchies based in Benin.

== Structure ==
The current president of HCRB is Kpodégbé Toyi Djigla, the king of Ardra. Its current secretary general is King Gangorosuambou of Kika.

The organisation is entirely made up by non-sovereign kings located within Benin. In order for a kingdom to be admitted to the organisation, it must have historical roots, have legal and political recognition, and have control over some piece of territory. The sub-national monarchies in Benin do not have official, political authority within the republic, but they hold influence within their local area and are often courted by politicians for support.

== Activities ==
The HCRB often released statements on political issues within Benin, such as in 2015 when it called on the government "to act in a spirit of responsibility and sacrifice" following violent incidents in May. It's unclear what impact these statements have. In May 2022, the secretary general of the HCRB called on its members to no longer participate in political meetings or rallies.

The group also advocates for further legal recognition of traditional authorities in Benin, and has called on the Beninese government to create clear rules that must be met before someone may be recognised as a king, such as a kingdom having roots in history. Yèto Kandji, former Secretary General of the HCRB, stated in 2014 that the government did not wish to pass such a law.

Yèto Kandji also claimed that the HCRB was created to advocate for development within communities in Benin, such as increasing access to safe drinkable water in local villages.

== History ==
Prior to the founding the HCRB, another organisation existed (and still exists) to represent the various kings of Benin, the National Council of Kings of Benin (French: Conseil national des rois du Bénin). However, the National Council had a power and leadership dispute, and the organisation split up. Some kings left to form the Supreme Council of Sovereigns (French: Conseil supérieur des souverains). The two structures competed with one another for influence, however, the National Council of Kings of Benin was already officially registered with the Ministry of Interior. Following encouragement from President Boni Yayi, the kings came together to end the dispute, resulting in the High Council of Kings of Benin being founded in 2012.

In 2015, the HCRB officially endorsed Sébastien Ajavon for the Beninese presidency.

On 26 February 2021, Kpodégbé Toyi Djigla was re-elected president of the HCRB. A new executive office was also formed, containing 19 posts. Adjihinto, king of Zinvié Yevié, heads the General Treasury. King Latchèholou Guidimadjegbé of Avrankou was appointed General Reporter (French: Rapporteur général). King Nasounon of Banikoara and King Djaboutouboutou of Manigri were appointed as auditors. SABI Naina 3 of Nikki was appointed honorary president of the new executive office.

In December 2021, the HCRB released a statement calling for a suspension of the enthronement of a new king of Sèmère, of which there were two pretenders - Issiaka Doli Yaya and Chagam Arouna Abdou Karim Tcholouféi 2. The enthronement of Tcholouféi 2 was authorised by the prefect of Donga, Eliassou Biao Aïnin. The HCRB disagreed with his intervention and suggested the prefect did not have the power to decide who can be king.

In July 2022, the king of Wémé-Djigbé, Tossoholou Zoundjè Wandji Ganmasizo Toli Yélian, officially joined the HCRB. Earlier in the year, Sèminvo Dòwòti Désir also joined the HCRB. She was recognised as the "Queen Mother of the African Diaspora" (French: la Reine mère de la Diaspora Africaine).

== See also ==
- List of current constituent African monarchs
