= Dòwòti Désir =

Haitian interfaith leader and academic

Her Royal Majesty Dr. Dòwòti Désir
- Born: Port-au-Prince, Haiti
- Other name: Queen Mother Sêmévo I (Séminvo)
- Education: Barnard College, Columbia University; Bard College (MA); The New Seminary (Doctor of Ministry)
- Occupations: Interfaith leader, academic, human rights advocate
- Organisation: High Council of Kings of Benin
- Known for: Leadership in Afro-Atlantic spirituality; Queen Mother of the African diaspora in Benin
- Title: Queen Mother of the African Diaspora
- Website: Official website

'Dr. Dòwòti Désir' (also known as Queen Mother Sêmévo I, sometimes written Séminvo), is an interfaith leader, academic, and human rights advocate. She is a leader in Afro-Atlantic spirituality, particularly Manbo Asogwe in Haitian Vodou.. She is a member of the High Council of Kings of Benin and holds the position of Queen Mother of the African Diaspora in the Republic of Benin. She is the founder of the Royal Palace of the African Diaspora, an initiative that seeks to create a symbolic presence of royalty that represents the global African diaspora, focusing on cultural preservation and heritage.

== Background and education ==
Désir was born in Port-au-Prince, Haiti, to a devout Catholic Cuban mother and an atheist Haitian father.

She is a graduate of Barnard College at Columbia University. She also earned a Master of Arts in Contemporary Art and Critical Theory from the Bard College Center for Curatorial Studies in Annandale-on-Hudson, as well as a Doctorate of Ministry from in Interfaith Studies The New Seminary.

== Enthronement and Titles ==
Désir was enthroned as Queen of the, Bénin Republic African Diaspora in 2020.

On February 19, 2022, Désir was formally admitted as Queen Mother Sêmévo I to the High Council of Kings of Benin. In this roleshe is also an Ambassador-at-Large, aiming to connect Benin and its diaspora.

== Advocacy and career ==
As Queen Mother, Désir founded the Imperial Corps Agoodjié of the African Diaspora (ICAAD). She holds the traditional Fongbe title of Kpodjito (Mother of the Leopard).

In 2005, Désir became the first executive director of the Malcolm X & Dr. Betty Shabazz Memorial Educational and Cultural Center in New York.

Désir has also held various academic positions within institutions such as Dutchess Community College, Brooklyn College, and City University of New York (CUNY). Désir has studied and worked in human rights, religious systems Afro-Atlantic, social justice, reparations, African heritage, and Afro-Atlantic spiritual practices.

== Bibliography ==
- Reparations, Reconnaissance, Justice(essay, from Essays in Human Rights: A Vodou Priest's Perspective)
- Wanga: Haitian Hoodoo (2022)
