= Dada Agonlinhossou Yèto Kandji =

King of the Kingdom of Agonlin, a non-sovereign monarchy in Benin

Dada Agonlinhossou Yèto Kandji is the 5th king of the Kingdom of Agonlin, a non-sovereign monarchy located in Benin. He has been monarch since 1993. His kingdom comprises the municipalities of Zagnanado, Covè and Ouinhi. His royal palace is located in Agonli-Houégbo, Zagnanado.

== Activities ==
Yèto Kandji has advocated for further legal recognition of the non-sovereign kings and other traditional authorities in Benin. and is currently the Chief Organiser of the High Council of Kings of Benin (French: Haut Conseil des rois du Bénin), an advocacy group for the various sub-national monarchies in Benin.

The king holds annual events celebrating his reign, such as in 2014 and 2020. He also patronises local traditional ceremonies, rituals and Vodun religious events, such as in 2015 when he participated in a religious festival organised by L’Union du culte vodoun d’Agonlin.

== History ==
Yèto Kandji was crowned monarch in 24 February 1993.

Yèto Kandji was elected President of the Council of Mahi Kings (French: Conseil des rois mahi) in 2013. He also served as secretary general of the High Council of Kings of Benin, and was previously the treasurer of the National Council of Kings of Benin (French: Conseil national des rois du Bénin).

In 2014, he celebrated 20 years of reigning as king. 200,000,000 CFA Francs were spent to rehabilitate the kings palace. A statue of King Yèto, the founder of the kingdom who reigned between 1634-1731, was also erected.

In 2017, basketballer Ian Mahinmi visited the king and was granted the title of Prince of the Royal Palace of Agonlin. He was also given the name "Prince Wanignon".

He celebrated 27 years of reigning as king in 2020. Offerings were made to his predecessors, as well as local deities and other ancestors. The Vodoun deity Sanligan, who oversees the local Angolin Vodoun cult, was also honoured.

Yèto Kandji endorsed lréné Agossa as candidate for the Les Démocrates political party in the 2021 presidential election of Benin.

== Personal ==
Yèto Kandji's grandfather was King Azonssi Togni Agonlinhossou. Yèto Kandji did not receive a high level education and did not get a Primary School Certificate. While in his CM2 class, he became sick and had difficulty travelling to school. Yèto Kandji claims that around this period, an oracle revealed that he was to be king. During his youth, he lived in Ouidah.

He has three wives. In 2011, he visited Spain and met his third wife, a Spaniard named Queen Sessimè. Yèto Kandji has stated in 2014 that he had two older brothers, both of whom died.

He has a son called Prince Eri Ala.
