= Kambole =

- Location in Togo
- Coordinates: 8°59′N 1°08′E
- Country: Togo
- Region: Centrale Region
- Prefecture: Tchamba
- Elevation: 345 m (1,132 ft)

Population (2010)
  - Total: 52,000

Kambolé (Camboli or Kaboli) is a small town in the prefecture of Tchamba located 90 km east of Sokode, capital of the Centrale Region in Togo (West Africa). It was founded between the 14th and the 15th century by the original hunter of Ife ethnicity, named Ode Amon, who came from Nigeria. the town is a center of trade for the surrounding agricultural region. Kambolé has a population of about 50,000 residents. The people of the town speak Ede Nago, of the Manigri-Kambole variety.

== History ==
The foundation of the village dates back to between the 16th and 17th centuries. From Nigeria, the founder, Ode Amon came from Ilé Ife (Ilé Ifan language Yoruba), cradle of the Anago language. A Descendant of Odoudouwa, Ode Amon was a renowned hunter, hence its name: Ode Amon, that is to say, "the hunter we know better, or the renowned hunter "in Yoruba language.

For reasons of social insecurity, Ode Amon left Ilé Ifè and after several stopovers in (Idjiho in Nigeria, Savè and Igbomakoh in Dahomey (now Benin) along the river Ofe (current Ouémé River)). He arrived at Katankou where he established his first camp with his followers. During a hunting party south of the Katankou forest area, he found a clearing where he installed a crossing site, later named Oke Gengele which means "Hill" in Yoruba.

He let his fighter aid and down along a river to a wild trough called Kpokpo Yaa, whose source Guénguélé. He saw a herd of elephants taking a drink. The rifle he charged was intended for small game with the intent to kill just for the evening meal. In desperation, he fired it anyway and discovered that he had killed one of them. Delighted, he cut off his tail and up the river to find his result. When he arrived, his hunter wanted to help find out what killed him. He held up the tail of the elephant. Help hunter remarked that the game was too big for the evening meal. Ode Amon back along another river named "Odo Nkpokou", now called "Atan EDI" (water reservoir (Atan) which pushes a water plant that serves arrow door (EDI)) . There he saw buffalo and killed a he extracted hoses for their evening meal. The next day, he returned to his camp at Katankou where he related his adventure to his brother Olou Adjifô. On the recommendation of his brother, they invited the community to help Lofoi dissecting the loot.

Thereafter Ode Amon showed his brother his intention to settle in the area he had discovered (Guénguélé). The latter then advised him to give it a poultry couple (a rooster and a hen) to test the livability of the area. But before letting the poultry at the place, he implored the gods of the medium in these terms: "If this place is habitable, this hen procreated, otherwise I discovered the remains." Back in Katankou, he traveled to the Gold Coast (Ghana) for the sale of ivory. He stopped over the edge of Anyigan and went in alone for a field trip. He then sat under a tree behind the house of a hunter he will know later. Indeed, appearing suspicious and scary, the village children alerted their parents. This is none other Ode Agoué by a particular sign, acknowledged that Ode Amon was also a hunter. He then requested and granted their hospitality during their stay in Anyigan. In their discussion, Ode Agoué made it clear to his host that he was not comfortable in his current residence area and would be happy to live with if he proves he is a more hospitable site. Ode promised Amaoun give him an answer on his return and then continued his journey to Ghana. Further, he met the Ashanti (Adobia, Takété and Awoyo), fleeing wars. He promised them assistance upon return.

As promised, he found the Ashanti where he had left them and led them to Alibi come to warn his brother and then organize their installation. At Katankou, he shared his meetings with his brother. Olou Adjifô recalled him to go check his poultry on the site Guénguélé. There he struck some dry wood or shook a gourd containing sorghum other to bring out the chickens. They came out with more new chicks. Hence the new future of the village neighborhoods. He then concludes that the area was hospitable and went the news to his brother. They then returned to build the first huts (abéhéma in Yoruba language). He gave the name Aboliya to his hamlet, which means "we are freed from suffering."

Some time later, he sent a delegation for his friend Ode Agoué of Aniyagan. He replied that it was impossible for him to come because he had lost his wife. Ode Amon then decided to give him his daughter in marriage and returns search again. Ode Agoué asked for time to gather his things. It took a third delegation to lead to Ode Agoué Aboliya today Kambolé hence the nickname given to this community Amuyanwa that is to say "we brought people." He installed them at the feet of the hill of Guénguélé, Djoboré current quarter. As agreed, Ode Amon gave his daughter in marriage to Ode Agoué. Hence the relationship that unites the two communities (and Atafa Bonu).

Note that the order of arrival of the communities differ from one story to another. This is among others:

Bonu (Djoboré, Adja) Lofoi (Kpamassaro) Ashanti (Adobia, Awoyo, Takété) Saabi (Adobia) Kala (Kala)

== Bibliography ==
- "A sociolinguistic survey of the Ede language communities of Benin and Togo" (PDF). sil.org.
