= Federal monarchy =

Federation of states with a single main monarch and different state leaders

A federal monarchy is a federation of states with a single monarch as overall head of the federation, but retaining different monarchs, or having a non-monarchical system of government, in the various states joined to the federation.

Currently, Malaysia and the United Arab Emirates are the only official federal monarchies in the world. However, Spain is often considered a de facto federal monarchy.

== As a term in political science ==
The term was introduced into English political and historical discourse by Edward Augustus Freeman, in his History of Federal Government (1863). Freeman himself thought a federal monarchy only possible in the abstract.

== Federal monarchies ==
=== Historically ===
Historically, the most prominent example of a federal monarchy in the Western world was the German Empire (1871–1918) and, to a lesser extent, its predecessors (North German Confederation and German Confederation). The head of state of the federation was a monarch, the German Emperor, who was also head of state of the largest constituent part to the federation as King of Prussia; other constituent monarchies, such as the kingdoms of Bavaria, Saxony and Württemberg and various grand duchies, duchies and principalities, retained their own monarchs and armies. Besides the 23 monarchies (22 constituent monarchies and the German emperor) there were also three oligarchic city-states – Bremen, Hamburg and Lübeck – and Alsace-Lorraine, a semi-autonomous republic since 1912.

In the Eastern Hemisphere, an example is the system of government in India in the 3rd century BCE Maurya Empire, where regional rulers appointed by the emperor headed the regional administration that governed the distant regions of the empire. It was revived in 16th century under the rule of Mughal Emperor Akbar, in which the subahs (other than Delhi) were controlled by subahdars appointed by the emperor and the regional kings. The emperor himself supervised the regional rulers and thus personally looked after the welfare of his people.

The concept played a role in political debates in Italy and Austria-Hungary in the nineteenth century and in Yugoslavia in the twentieth century, but it was not put into effect in any of the cases. For example, modern Italy had not unified until Risorgimento of the late 19th century, with the several smaller kingdoms, duchies, republics, etc., each headed by a different dynasty or ruling class, being disestablished in favor of a unitary monarchy under the house of Savoy.

=== Currently ===
Currently, the term can be applied in the fullest sense to the United Arab Emirates and Malaysia. In both, the head of state of the entire federation is selected from among the heads of states (Emir or Sultan respectively) who rule the constituent states of the federation.

While not officially declared as such, Spain has been referred to as a federal monarchy, due to having many autonomous communities helmed by presidents who all answer to the Spanish crown. Officially, Spain is a unitary state displaying a high degree of devolution.

Several Communities, regions and language areas constitute the Kingdom of Belgium, a federal state with a constitutional monarchy.

== List of federal monarchies ==
There are currently only two countries which qualify as federal monarchies, where the sovereign of the nation is a different person from the sovereigns of constituent states.

Federation	Subdivisions	Number of subdivisions	Monarch	Head of government
Malaysia	States and federal territories of Malaysia	13 states and 3 federal territories	Ibrahim Iskandar	Anwar Ibrahim
United Arab Emirates	Emirates of the United Arab Emirates	7 emirates	Mohamed bin Zayed Al Nahyan	Mohammed bin Rashid Al Maktoum

== See also ==
- Form of government
- List of monarchies
- Federal republic
- Non-sovereign monarchy
- Vassal
