= Iru (company) =

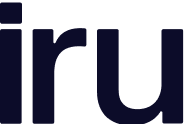
- Formerly: Kandji (2018–2025)
- Type: Private
- Industry: Software; Cybersecurity
- Founded: 2018; 8 years ago in San Diego, California
- Founders: Adam Pettit; Wesley Pettit; Mark Daughters
- Headquarters: Miami, United States
- Area served: Worldwide
- Key people: Adam Pettit (CEO)
- Products: Iru platform
- Website: iru.com

Iru, formerly known as Kandji, is an American technology company that develops an enterprise device management and security platform. It is based in San Francisco, California.

== History ==
Kandji was founded in 2018 by Adam Pettit, Wesley Pettit, and Mark Daughters in California to develop an Apple mobile device management platform. In 2019, Kandji launched its platform, initially specializing in the management of Apple devices, including macOS, iPhones, iPads, and Apple TV.

After launch, Kandji grew, especially as remote work during the COVID-19 pandemic drove companies to expand their Mac deployments. In 2020, it raised $21 million in a Series A to expand its operations. A year later, it raised $60 million in Series B funding and followed by a $100 million Series C led by Tiger Global in late 2021. It used the funding to expand its operations and opened an office in London and a European data centre in Frankfurt.

In 2022, Kandji launched Device Harmony platform, which integrated device management with vulnerability monitoring and compliance tools. In 2023, Kandji introduced an endpoint detection and response (EDR) agent for Macs.

In 2024, Kandji launched its AI chatbot, Kai, that works with Prism, a managed device reporting service, to provide insights into device fleets. In July 2024, Kandji raised $100 million in a Series D round led by General Catalyst.

In February 2025, Kandji established a new East Coast headquarters in Coral Gables, Florida, while maintaining its existing operations in California. In July 2025, Kandji introduced the Vulnerability Response feature to detect and resolve vulnerabilities in Apple devices.

In October 2025, Kandji was renamed as Iru as it opened the Apple-only service to Windows and Android device management and united identity, endpoint security, and compliance automation into one AI-based system.
