= Kpodégbé Djigla =

Kpodégbé Lanmanfan Toyi Djigla is the 16th king of the Fon State of Allada in central Benin. He rose to the throne on December 2, 1992. Until 2016 the king of Allada served as the president of the Supreme Council of Kings of Benin. In the 2016 presidential election in Benin, he actively supported losing candidate Sébastien Ajavon.

Kpodégbé Toyi Djigla is currently president of the High Council of Kings of Benin. He is married to Queen Djéhami Kpodégbé Kwin-Epo.

== See also ==
- List of rulers of the Fon state of Alada
- List of current constituent African monarchs
