= Akpafu =

Akpafu-Mempeasem
- Country: Ghana
- Region: Volta Region

Akpafu-Mempeasem is a town in the Volta Region of Ghana. The town is known for the Akpafu Secondary Technical School. The school is a second cycle institution.
