= Allada =

- Commune and city
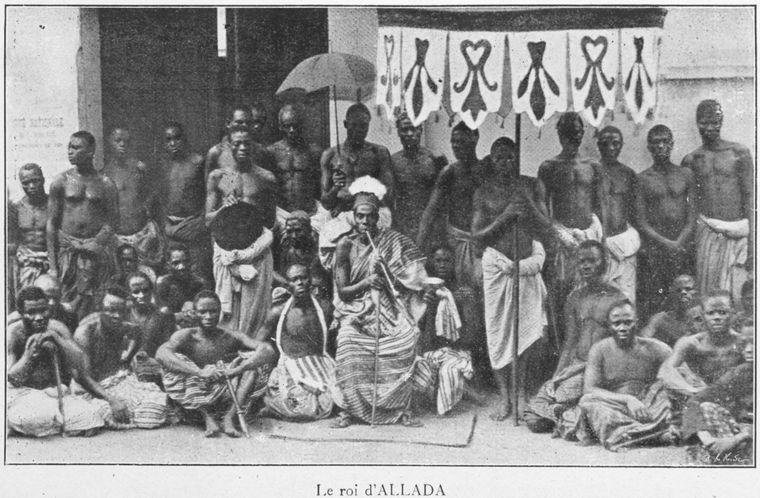

- Location in Benin
- Coordinates: 6°39′N 2°09′E
- Country: Benin
- Department: Atlantique Department

Area
  - Total: 381 km^{2} (147 sq mi)

Population (2013)
  - Total: 127,512
- Website: http://www.web-africa.org/allada/

Allada [a.la.da] is a town, arrondissement, and commune, located in the Atlantique Department of Benin.

The current town of Allada corresponds to Great Ardra (also called Grand Ardra, or Arda), which was the capital of an Adja-Eʋe kingdom also called Allada (the kingdom of Ardra or kingdom of Allada), which existed as a sovereign kingdom from around the 13th or 14th century (date of the initial settlements by Aja people, reorganized as a kingdom c. 1600) until 1724, when it fell to the armies of neighbour Kingdom of Dahomey. The present-day commune of Allada covers an area of 381 square kilometres and as of 2013 had a population of 127,512 people.

== History ==
In the mid-sixteenth century, Allada (then called Grand Ardra, or Arda) had a population of about 30,000 people.

The original inhabitants of Ardra were ethnic Aja. According to oral tradition, the Aja migrated to southern Benin around the 12th or 13th century, coming from Tado, on the Mono River in modern Togo. They established themselves in the area that currently corresponds to southern Benin, until c. 1600, when three brothers – Kokpon, Do-Aklin, and Te-Agdanlin – split the rule of the region amongst themselves: Kokpon took the capital city of Great Ardra, reigning over the Allada kingdom, while his brother Do-Aklin founded Abomey (which would become capital of the Kingdom of Dahomey) and their brother Te-Agdanlin founded Little Ardra, also known as Ajatche (Little Adja), later called Porto-Novo (lit. 'new port') by Portuguese traders (which is the current capital city of Benin).

== Notable citizens and residents ==
The Haitian revolutionary leader Toussaint Louverture, who was the grandson of the Allada prince Gaou Guinou, was the founding father of the Republic of Haiti. There is a statue of L'Ouverture in the north of the town.

== Demographics ==
The main town demographics:

Year	Population
1979	12 022
2008 (estimate)	21 833
