= Fon people =

Ethnic group in Benin Republic

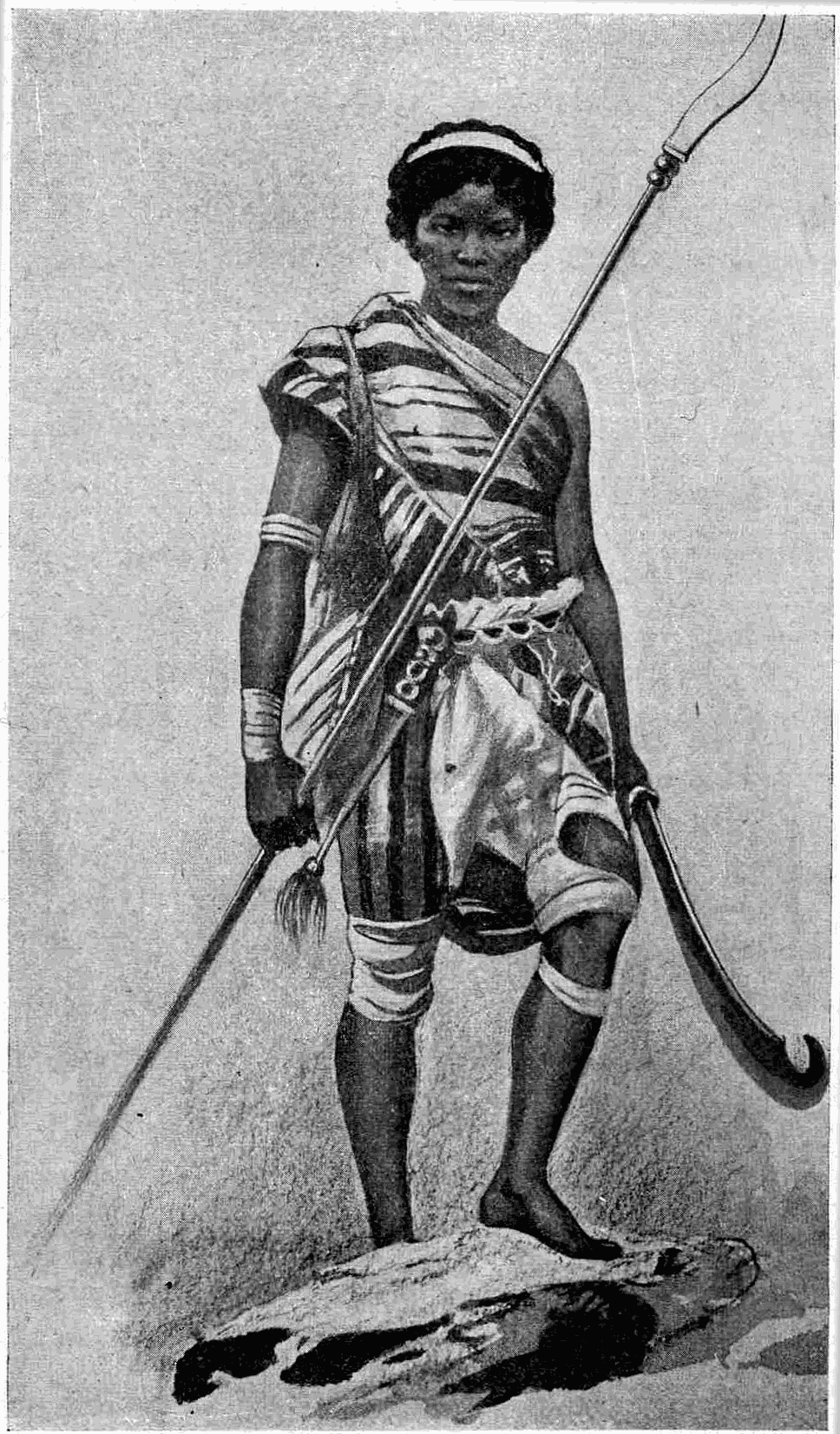
- "Dahomey Amazon" by Élisée Reclus (1905)

Total population
- 5 million (including related groups like; Gun, Mahi, Ayizo, Weme)

Languages
- Fon, French

Religion
- West African Vodun, Christianity, Islam

Related ethnic groups
- Other Gbe peoples, Arará

- Person: Fon
- People: Fon-nu
- Language: fɔ̀ngbè
- Country: Dahomey

The Fon people, also called Fon nû, and historically called the Dahomean people in colonial French literature, are the largest ethnic group in Benin, accounting for approximately 33.2% of the total population, more than 4,800,000 million people (39.2% if including the Gouns/Eguns, an offshoot ethnic group).

In addition to the main branch, mainly established in major cities like Cotonou, Abomey, Ouidah, Allada, Bohicon, Calavi, Lokossa, etc., there are several sub-groups, including the Kotafons and the Aïzos (Ayizos), across the southern part of Benin Republic. They are also established in southwest Togo, in the Atakpamé region. They speak Fongbe, one of the Gbe languages found in the Bight of Benin, which is spread along coastal areas of eastern Ghana, Togo, Benin and western Nigeria.

Although their geographic range is smaller compared to that of the Ewes, Akans, Fulanis, Yorubas, Igbos and other major ethnic groups in West Africa, the Fon people have an important cultural and sociological impact in the Bight of Benin. This is mainly due to the Dahomey kingdom which they founded in the 17th century, and which was for several decades one of the main economic hubs, as well as a key military power in the coastal region, second only to the Oyo Empire.

The Fons trace their roots back to the Aja people, and have mainly a culture of oral tradition. They were noted by early 19th-century European traders for their Dahomey Amazons – women serving in the army, who took part in the wars against French colonial forces decades later in 1890.

Notable Fon figures include; the five time Grammy Awards winner, singer and choreographer Angélique Kidjo, the film actor Djimon Hounsou, the former head of state Patrice Talon, and the economist Lionel Zinsou.

== Origin ==
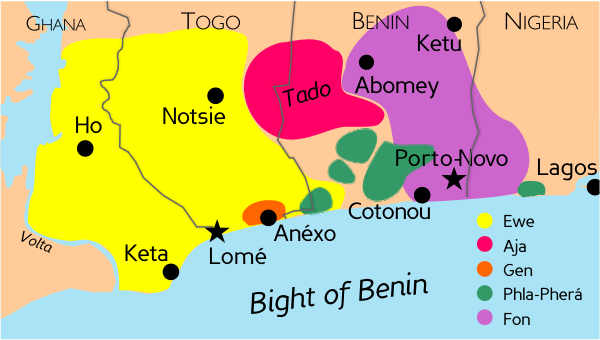
The Gbe language area. Map of the Fon (purple) and other ethnic groups, according to Capo (1998). Since the seventeenth century, the Fon have been concentrated in the Benin region and the southwestern part of Togo and Nigeria.

The Fon people, like neighboring ethnic groups in West Africa, remained an oral tradition society through the late medieval era, without ancient historical records. According to these oral histories and legends, the Fon people originated in present-day Tado, an Aja kingdom now situated near the Togo–Benin border. Their earliest ancestors, called the Agasuvi, were originally a part of the ruling class in Tado.

The ruling Agasuvi in Tado had a major dispute; one group broke off and migrated southeast to Allada with king Lande Ajahouto. The sons of king Ajahouto disputed who should succeed him after his death, and the group split yet again. This time, a group migrated with Ajahouto's middle son Do-Aklin or Dogbari northwards to the Abomey plateau, where they founded the kingdom of Dahomey sometime about 1620 CE. The Fon people have been settled there since, while the kingdom of Dahomey underwent subsequent expansions in southeast Benin by conquering various neighboring kingdoms.

Some sources further attribute the origins of the Fon people to the intermarrying between this migrating Allada-nu Agasuvi Aja group from the south with the Gedevi, a subgroup of the Ayo-nu inhabitants in the (Yoruba) Kingdoms of the plateau. These Yorubas were known as the Igede, which the Ajas called the Gede-vi.

But these sources are highly controversial. The claim to any origin from within Allada is not recorded in contemporary sources before the late eighteenth century, and is very likely an attempt by the ruling dynasty in the Dahomean kingdom's capital of Agbome to legitimize its conquest of the independent coastal Kingdom of Allada in the 1720s. These claims can also be interpreted as a metaphorical expressions of cultural and political influences between kingdoms rather than actual kinship.

== History ==
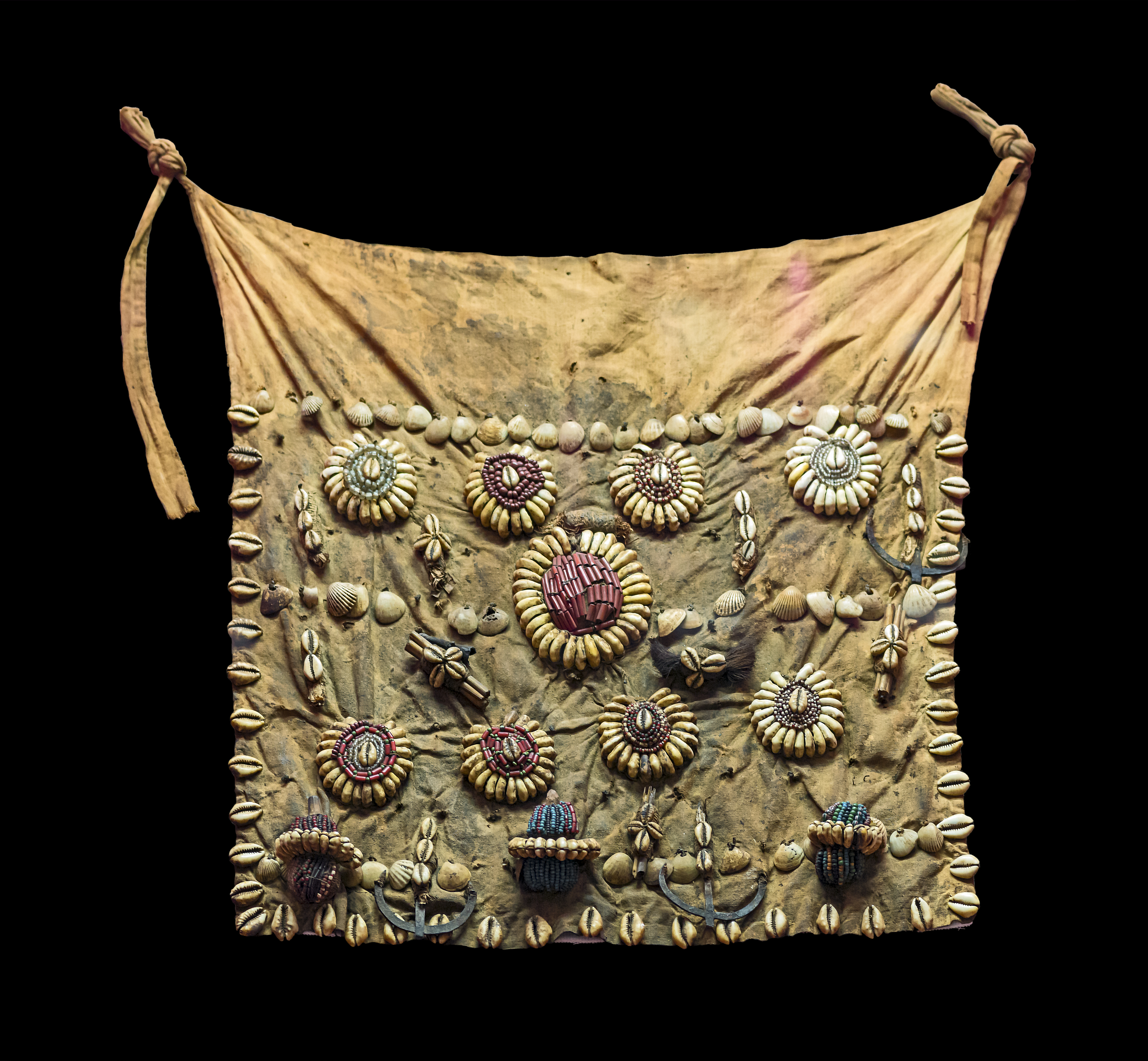
"Amazon King Apron", Dahomey : the nineteenth century

While references and documented history about the Fon people are scant before the 17th century, there are abundant documents on them from the 17th century, particularly written by European travelers and traders to West African coasts. These memoirs mention such cities as Ouidah and Abomey. Among the most circulated texts are those of Archibald Dalzel, a slave trader who in 1793 wrote the legends, history and slave trading practices of the Fon people in a book titled the History of Dahomey. Modern era scholars have questioned the objectivity and accuracy of Dalzel, and to what extent his pioneering book on Fon people was a polemic or dispassionate scholarship.

In the 19th century and early 20th century, as the French presence increased and then the colonial period began in the Benin and nearby regions, more history and novels with references to the Fon people appeared, such as those by Édouard Foà, N. Savariau, Le Herisse and M.J. Herskovits' anthropological study on Fon people published in 1938.

These histories suggest that Fon people's kingdom of Dahomey expanded in early 18th century, particularly during King Agaja's rule through the 1740s, reaching the Atlantic coast from their inland capital of Abomey. During this period, 200 years after Portugal had already settled in the Kongo people lands on the Atlantic coast of Central Africa in the 16th century, there were numerous plantations in the Caribbean and Atlantic coastline of South America, which had already created a booming demand for slaves from the European traders. The expanded territory of the Dahomey kingdom was well positioned to supply this transatlantic trade and the 18th and 19th century history of the Fon people is generally presented within this context.

=== Slavery, Bight of Benin ===
The Fon people did not invent slavery in Africa, nor did they have a monopoly on slavery nor exclusive slave trading activity. The institution of slavery long predates the origins of the Fon people in the Aja kingdom and the formation of the kingdom of Dahomey. The sub-Saharan and the Red Sea region, states Herbert Klein – a professor of history, was already trading between 5,000 and 10,000 African slaves per year between 800 and 1600 CE, with a majority of these slaves being women and children. According to John Donnelly Fage – a professor of history specializing in Africa, a "slave economy was generally established in the Western and Central Sudan by about the fourteenth century at least, and had certainly spread to the coasts around the Senegal and in Lower Guinea by the fifteenth century".

Slave shipment between 1501 and 1867, by region (Note: This slave trade volume excludes the slave trade by Swahili-Arabs in East Africa and North African ethnic groups to the Middle East and elsewhere. The exports and imports do not match, because of the large number of deaths and violent retaliation by captured people on the ships involved in the slave trade.)
Region	Total embarked	Total disembarked
West Central Africa	5.69 million	
Bight of Benin	2.00 million	
Bight of Biafra	1.6 million	
Gold Coast	1.21 million	
Windward Coast	0.34 million	
Sierra Leone	0.39 million	
Senegambia	0.76 million	
Mozambique	0.54 million	
Brazil (South America)		4.7 million
Rest of South America		0.9 million
Caribbean		4.1 million
North America		0.4 million
Europe		0.01 million

By the 15th century, Songhay Empire rulers to the north of the Fon people, in the Niger River valley, were already using thousands of captured slaves for agriculture. The demand for slave labor to produce sugarcane, cotton, palm oil, tobacco and other goods in the plantations of European colonies around the globe had sharply grown between 1650 and 1850. The Bight of Benin was already shipping slaves in the late 17th century, before the Fon people expanded their kingdom to gain control of the coast line. The Fon rulers and merchants, whose powers were established on the Atlantic coast between 1700 and 1740, entered this market. The Fon people were divided on how to respond to the slave demand. Some scholars suggest that Fon people and Dahomey rulers expressed intentions to curtail or end slave trading, states Elizabeth Heath, but historical evidence affirms that the Benin coastline including the ports of the Dahomey rulers and the Fon people became one of the largest exporter of slaves.

The kingdom of Dahomey, along with the neighbouring kingdom of Benin and the Oyo Empire, engaged in slave raiding and trading into transatlantic slavery. The competition for captives, slaves and government revenues, amongst the African kingdoms, escalated the mutual justification and pressure. The captives were sold as slaves to the Europeans from the Bight of Benin (also called the Slave Coast), from the eighteenth to the nineteenth century.

During the Atlantic Slave Trade, the Fon people were both victims and victimisers of other ethnic groups. Under vassalship to the Oyo Empire, Dahomey had to provide Oyo with slaves as annual tribute. Many of these slaves were Fon men, which altered the gender demographics of the Dahomeans, and resulted in their reliance on an all-female military unit, called the Agoji or Mino. Many of the Fon people, annually enslaved by Oyo, were sold into the Atlantic Slave Trade. Criminals of Dahomey could also be exported to the New World, even if they were Fon.

The foreign slaves sold by Dahomey came from wars between the Oyo Empire, the Kingdom of Dahomey, and the Allada Kingdom. However, other enslaved people came from systematic kidnapping within the kingdom or at the frontiers, as well as the caravans of slaves brought in by merchants from the West African interior. The Fon kingdom of Dahomey controlled the port of Ouidah, from where numerous European slave ships disembarked. However, this was not the only port of the region, and it competed with the ports controlled by other nearby kingdoms on the Bight of Benin and the Bight of Biafra. The enslaved people sold by Dahomey, belonged to ethnic groups such as the: Ewe, Aja, Whydah, Mina, and Yoruba.

The Fon people, along with the neighbouring ethnic groups such as the Ewe people, disembarked in French colonies to work as slaves in the plantations of the Caribbean and South American coast. They were initially called Whydah, which probably meant "people sold by Alladah". The word Whydah phonetically evolved into Rada, the name of the West African community that embarked in slave ships from the Bight of Benin, and is now found in Haiti, Saint Lucia, Trinidad, French Antilles and other nearby islands with French influence. In some Caribbean colonial documents, alternate spellings such as Rara are also found.

The slave traders and ship owners of European colonial system encouraged competition, equipped the various kingdoms with weapons, which they paid for with slaves, as well as built infrastructure such as ports and forts to strengthen the small kingdoms. However, slave trading in the Bight of Benin soon came to an end as European and American nations passed legislation which outlawed their involvement in the slave trade. The last nation in the Americas to officially outlaw the slave trade was Imperial Brazil, in 1851. When slave exports ceased, the king of Dahomey shifted to agricultural exports to France, particularly palm oil, but used slaves to operate the plantations. The agricultural exports were not as lucrative as slave exports had been in past. To recover state revenues he leased the ports in his kingdom to the French through a signed agreement in late 19th century. The French interpreted the agreement as ceding the land and ports, while the Dahomey kingdom disagreed. The dispute led to a French attack in 1890, and the annexation of the kingdom as a French colony in 1892. This started the colonial rule for the Fon people.

As a result of the Atlantic Slave Trade, a notable Fon population was dispersed throughout the Americas, particularly Haiti, Cuba, Trinidad and Brazil. This gave rise to Afro-Diaspora religions like Haitian Vodou and Candomble, which contain strong elements of Dahomean religion.

=== French colonial era ===
The period of French colonial empire marked the end of the Fon royalty, though France kept the system of plantations, which they had inherited from the royalty. The only difference, so states Patrick Manning – a professor of World History specializing on Africa, for the next seventy years was that the French colonial state, instead of the former king of Fon people, now decided how the surplus (profits) from these plantations were to be spent. The French colonial administrators made some infrastructure improvements to improve the plantation profitability and logistics to serve French colonial interests.

The French colonial administration targeted slavery in Benin, they outlawed capture of slaves, legally freed numerous slaves, but faced resistance and factional struggles from previous local slave owners running their farms. The slavery that continued included those that was lineage-related, who cohabited within families in the region. The Fon aristocracy adapted to the new conditions, by joining the ranks of administrators in the French rule.

Taxes new to the Dahomey colony's people, which the French called impôt, similar to those already practiced in France, were introduced on all ethnic groups, including the Fon people, by the colonial administrators. Payment of these were regularly resisted or just refused, leading to confrontations, revolts, arrests, prison terms and forced labor. These complaints gelled into an anti-colonial nationalism movement in which the Fon people participated. France agreed to autonomy to Dahomey in 1958, and full independence in 1960.

== Religion ==
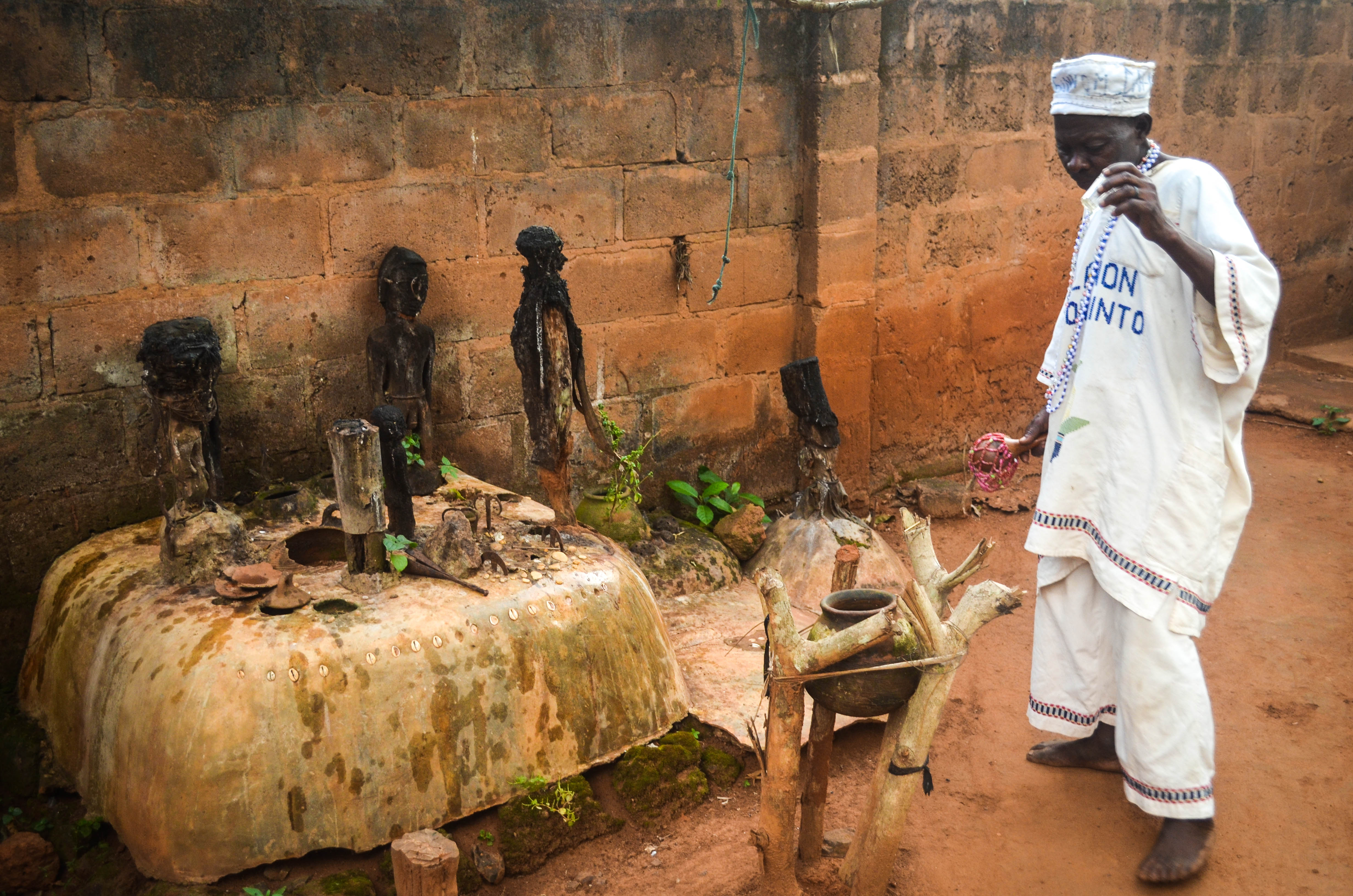
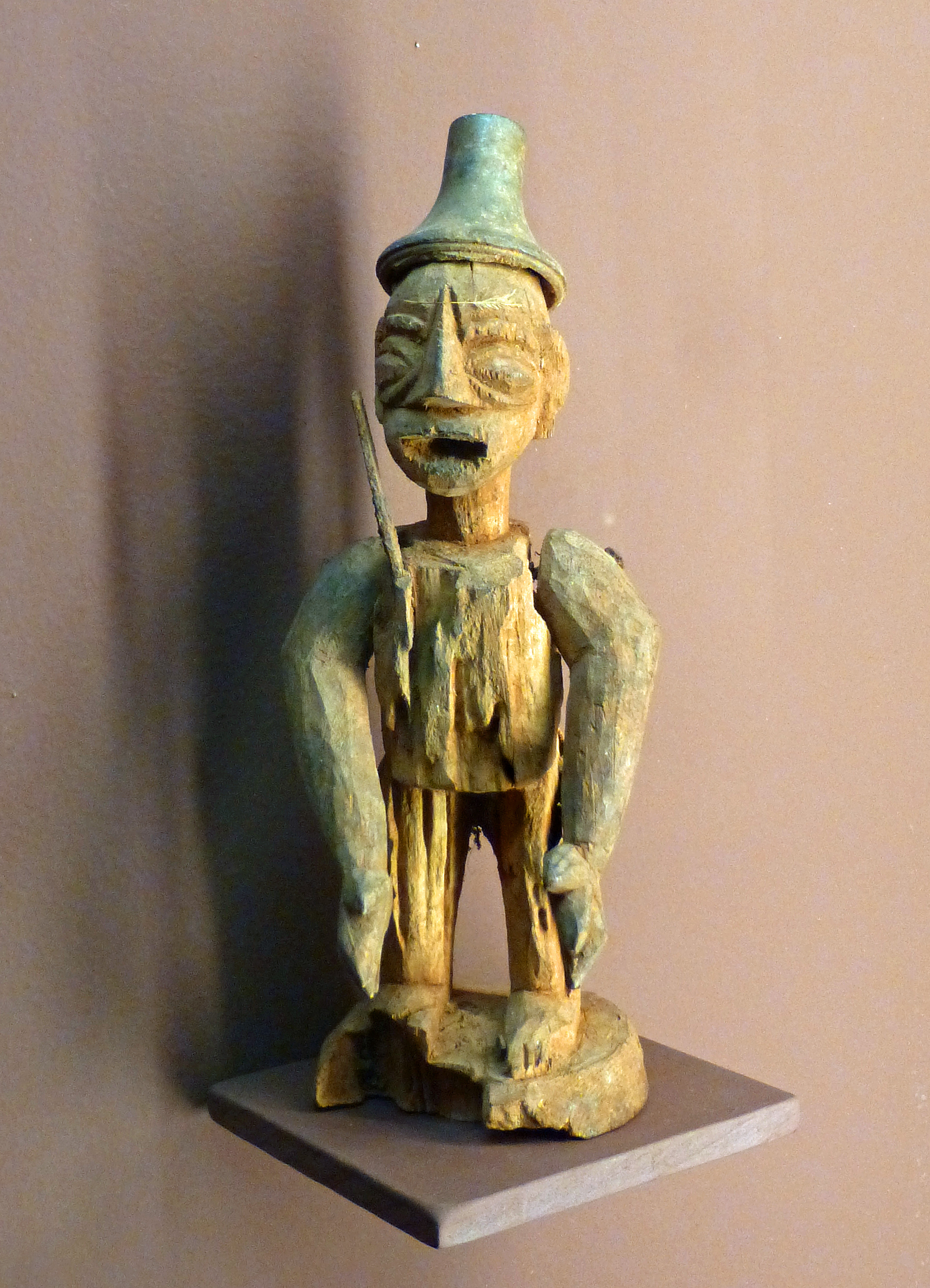
The deities of Fon people. Some Fon have converted to Christianity or Islam, while retaining their traditional religious practices called Vodun or "Ifa.".

Some Fon people converted to Christianity or Islam under the influence of missionaries during the colonial era, in Benin and in French West Indies colonies, but many continued their traditional religious practices. While Islam arrived in the Benin area between 11th and 13th centuries, Christianity was adopted by Dahomey ruler Agonglo who came to power in 1789, and his Fon royalty supporters, with missionaries welcomed. According to Steven Mailloux, the missionaries attempted to integrate the old concepts of Fon people on cosmogenesis to be same as Adam-Eve, and their Legba to be Christian Satan, teachings that led to syncretism rather than abandonment.

The Fon people, states Mary Turner, have generally proven to be highly resistant to Christianity and Islam, even when brought over as slaves in a new environment as evident in Haiti. They have generally refused to accept innovative re-interpretation of Fon mythologies within the Abrahamic mythical framework. The priests of the Fon people, contrary to the expectations of the missionaries, adopted and re-interpreted Abrahamic myths into their own frameworks.

=== Traditional beliefs ===
The traditional Fon religion is regionally called Vodoun, Vodzu or Vodu, which is etymologically linked to Vodun – a term that refers to their theological concept of "numerous immortal spirits and deities".

The religious practice of the Fon people have four overlapping elements: public gods, personal or private gods, ancestral spirits, and magic or charms. Thus, the Vodoun religion is polytheistic. The Fon people have a concept of a female Supreme Being called Nana Buluku, who gave birth to the Mawu-Lisa and created the universe. After giving birth, the mother Supreme retired, and left everything to Mawu-Lisa (Moon-Sun, female-male) deities, spirits and inert universe. Mawu-Lisa created numerous minor imperfect deities. In Fon belief, the feminine deity Mawu had to work with trickster Legba and the cosmic serpent Aido Hwedo to create living beings, a method of creation that imbued the good, the bad and a destiny for every creature including human beings. Only by appeasing lesser deities and Legba, in Fon theology, can one change that destiny. This appeasing requires rituals and offerings to the lesser gods and ancestral spirits, who are believed to have ability to do favors to human beings. A typical traditional home compound of the Fon people has a Dexoxos, or ancestral shrine. The charms are locally called gbo, gris gris, ju ju, or obeah, involve leaves, herbs, smoke and these are offerings to public or personal gods of each family.

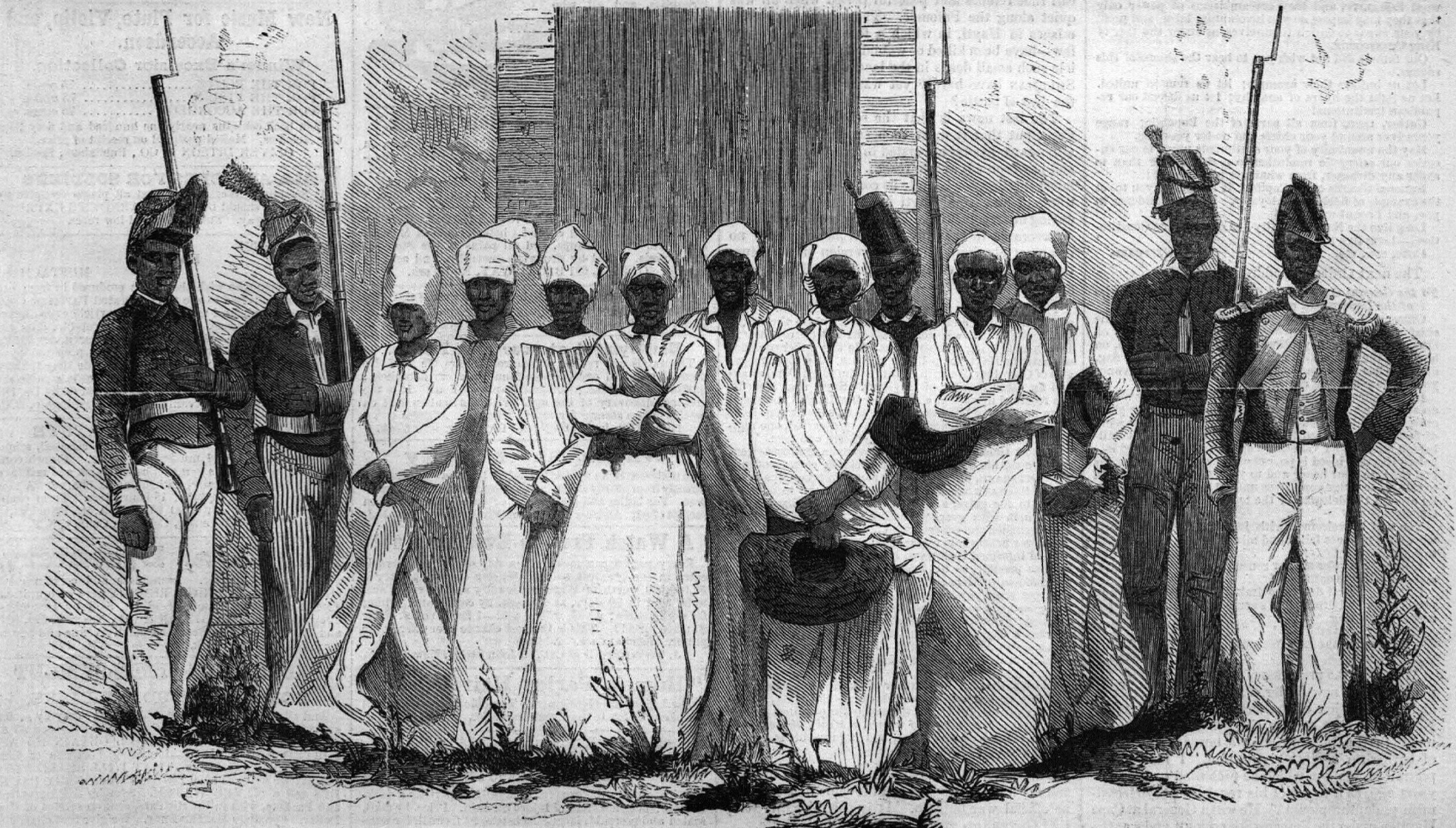
In 1864, eight Fon people were executed in Haiti on allegations of murder and cannibalism from Voodoo. Later scholars have questioned the lack of evidence, and whether the Bizoton trial was a product of prejudice.

While many Fon identify as Christian, the majority continue to practice Benin's traditional religion Vodun. The Fon have priests and mediums who receive the spirits on the occasion of the great festivals. The cult of the sacred serpents in the temple of Whydah had some importance, but eventually fell into disuse. Practice can involve drumming to induce possession by one of these gods or spirits. Together with other cultural groups from the Fon homeland region such as the Yoruba, Fon culture merged with French, Portuguese or Spanish to produce distinct religions (Voodoo, Obeah, Candomblé and Santería), dance and musical styles (Arará, Yanvalou).

In the French colonies, such as Saint-Domingue (now Haiti), the Christian missionaries confiscated and burnt the statues and religious objects of the Fon people, but this did not end their practices. They rebuilt their icons again. The Fon people and their government have reversed the colonial attempts to culturally change them. After the end of the colonial era, January 10 has been declared an official annual holiday in Benin dedicated to Vodun gods.

== Society and culture ==
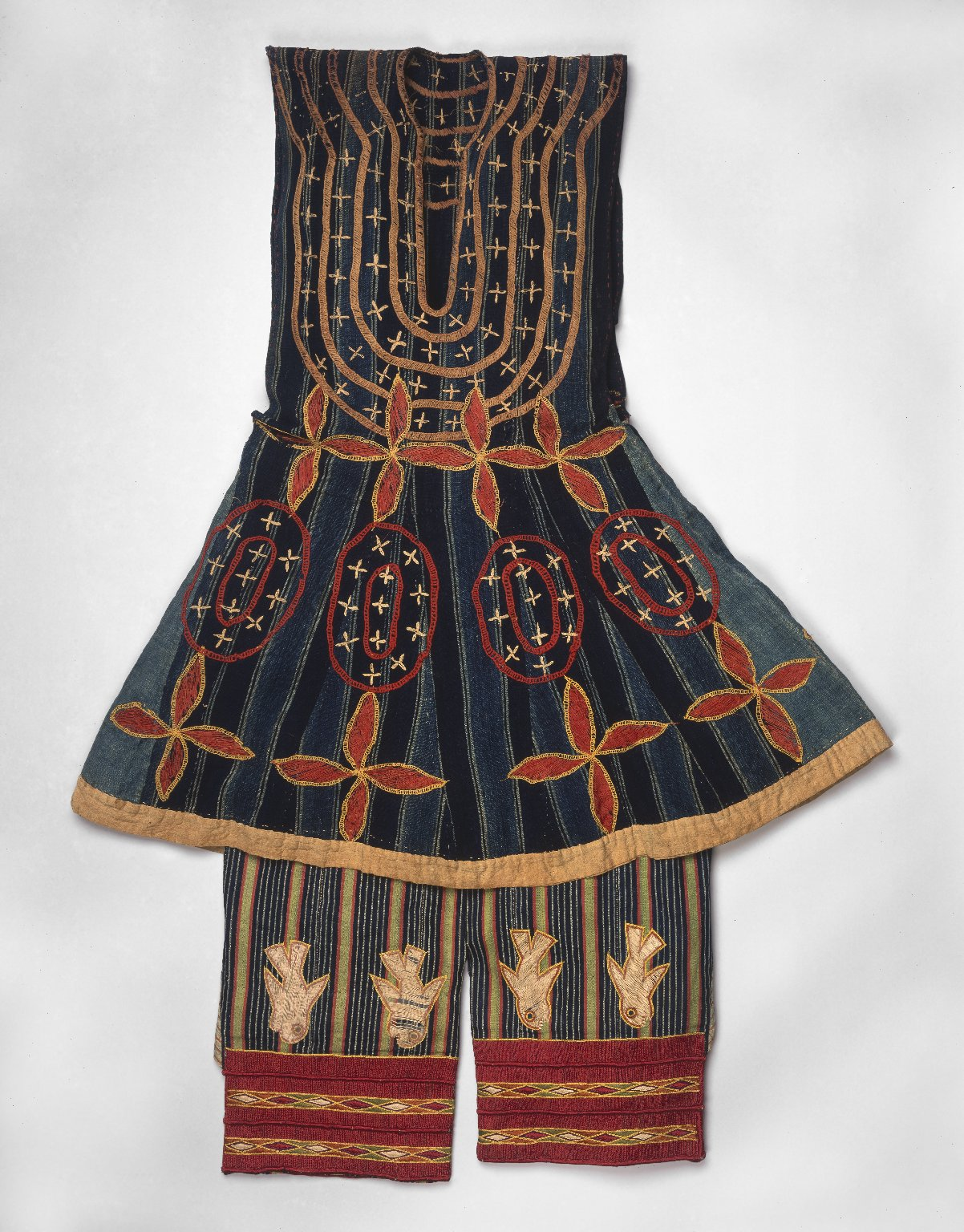
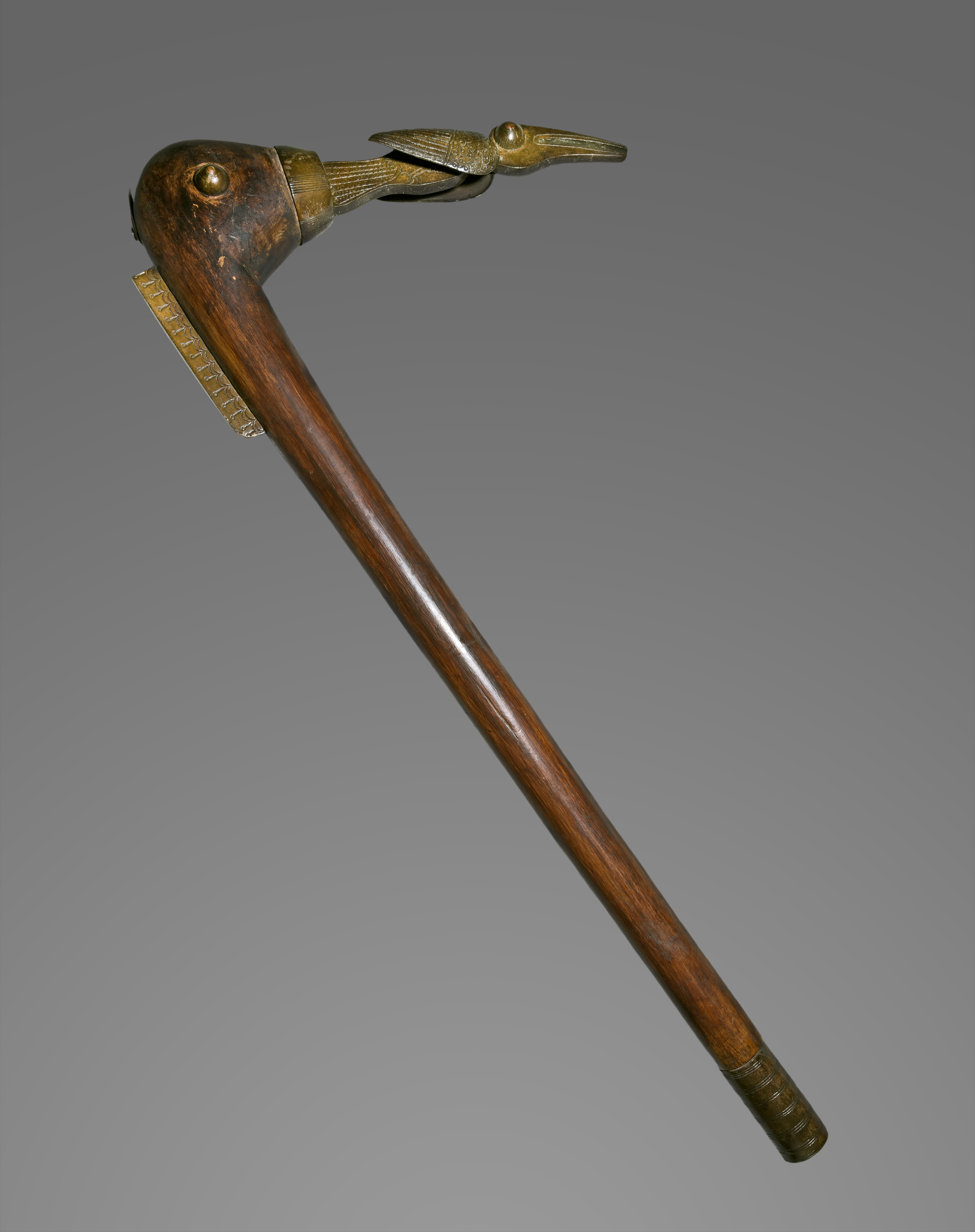
Robe (kansawu) and trousers, from 3-piece costume for royalty and nobility, late 19th century, and scepter.

The Fon people are traditionally settled farmers, growing cassava, corn and yams as staples. The men prepare the fields, women tend and harvest the crop. Hunting and fishing are other sources of food, while some members of the Fon society make pottery, weave clothes and produce metal utensils. Among the cash crops, palm oil plantations are common in Fon people's region. The Fon culture is patrilineal and allows polygyny and divorce. A man with multiple wives usually lived in a compound with each wife and her children occupying a separate hut. A collection of compounds formed a village, usually headed by a hereditary chief. In contemporary times, traditional patrilineal clan-based living and associated practices are uncommon.

Funerals and death anniversaries to remember their loved ones are important events, including drumming and dancing as a form of mourning and celebrating their start of life as a spirit by the one who died, can last for days.

The Fon culture incorporated culture and shared ideas with ethnic groups that have been their historical neighbors. Many of their practices are found among Yoruba people, Akan people, Ewe people and others.

=== Dahomey Amazons ===
A notable part of the Fon people's society was their use of female soldiers in combat roles over some two centuries. Over 3,000 women trained and served as regular warriors to protect the Fon and to expand its reach. The women warrior's brigade was led by a woman.

Given the oral tradition of Fon people, when women joined as warriors in Fon society is unclear. The earliest European records, such as those of Jean-Pierre Thibault, suggest that the tradition dates back to the early 18th century or even earlier. These gender roles were foreign to the European travellers, and early fictional stories in European media are considered unreliable by many scholars.

=== Sexuality ===
Same sex relationship between woman and woman were common amongst the Fon people. In contemporary Benin, boys sometimes enjoy close sexual friendships in order to ease libido.
