= Tchamba =

City and tribe in Togo

Tchamba Chamba
- City
- Location in Togo
- Coordinates: 9°02′N 1°25′E
- Country: Togo
- Region: Centrale Region
- Prefecture: Tchamba Prefecture

The name Tchamba sometimes spelled Chamba, stands for both a city located in Tchamba Prefecture in the Centrale Region of Togo, and the tribe living in that area.

Tchamba is originally a tribe living in and around the town of Chamba, Ghana in the Northern Region, Ghana of present-day Ghana, on the road from Salaga to Bimbilla. Part of the tribe is still living there; others have migrated to Accra and there is also an ex-pat community of Tchambas in Frankfurt (Main) in Germany.

The Tchambas are known as aborigines (indigenous people) of Northern Ghana, once covering an area as large as the present Dagbon. Due to major tribal wars between the Dagomba people and the Kokomba people in the aftermath of the First World War, many of them fled to present-day Tchamba in Northern Togo, while others fled to Accra, but a third group survived in the North of Ghana. The various groups maintain close relations, for example in the Chamba Heritage Society and it is not uncommon for families to live in two of their homelands. The Tchamba language is widely spoken in Togo, Ghana, Benin, and Nigeria. They have linguistical affiliations with Konkonba, Bassari. They are predominantly Moslems.

In Togo, the major clans are Imamwa, Congoro, Lari, Dopo, Sangbe, Lambu, Daru, Atarouwa, Nantoh, Ninchey, Kumateh, and others. The Congoros are the origins there, whereby the Laris among others came. The kingship was originally for the Congoros while the Islamic leadership position (Imam) is always held by Imamwa as their name implies. Some of the major towns in Tchamba are Alibi, Kasaleym and Affem Boussou.
