= Bight of Benin =

Bight in the Gulf of Guinea

- Golfe du Bénin (French)
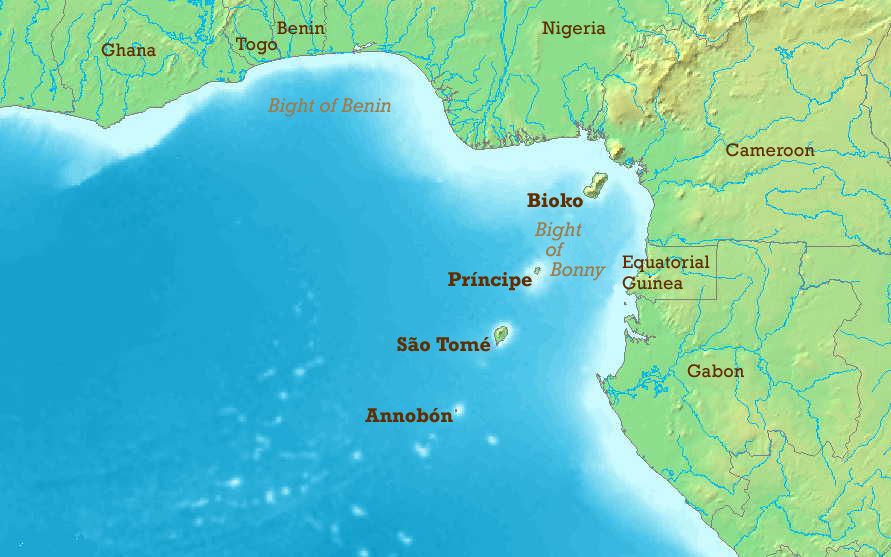
- Gulf of Guinea map showing the Bight of Benin.

- Location within Africa Location within Nigeria
- Coordinates: 5.0°N 2.1°E
- River sources: Niger
- Ocean/sea sources: Gulf of Guinea; Atlantic Ocean
- Basin countries: Ghana, Togo, Benin, Nigeria
- Max. length: 300 km (190 mi)
- Max. width: 640 km (400 mi)
- Settlements: Cotonou

The Bight of Benin, or Bay of Benin, is a bight in the Gulf of Guinea area on the western African coast.

== Geography ==
The Bight of Benin was named for the Kingdom of Benin in modern-day Nigeria. (The Republic of Benin, formerly Dahomey, took its name from the bight, not the other way around.) It extends eastward for about 640 kilometres (400 mi) from Cape St. Paul to the Nun outlet of the Niger River.

Historical associations with the Atlantic slave trade led to the region becoming known as the Slave Coast. As in many other regions across Africa, powerful indigenous kingdoms along the Bight of Benin relied heavily on a long-established slave trade that expanded greatly after the arrival of European powers and became a global trade with the colonization of the Americas. Estimates from the 1640s suggest that Benin (Beneh) took in 1200 slaves a year. Restrictions made it hard for slave volume to grow until new states and different routes began to make an increase in slave trade possible.

== Cultural references ==
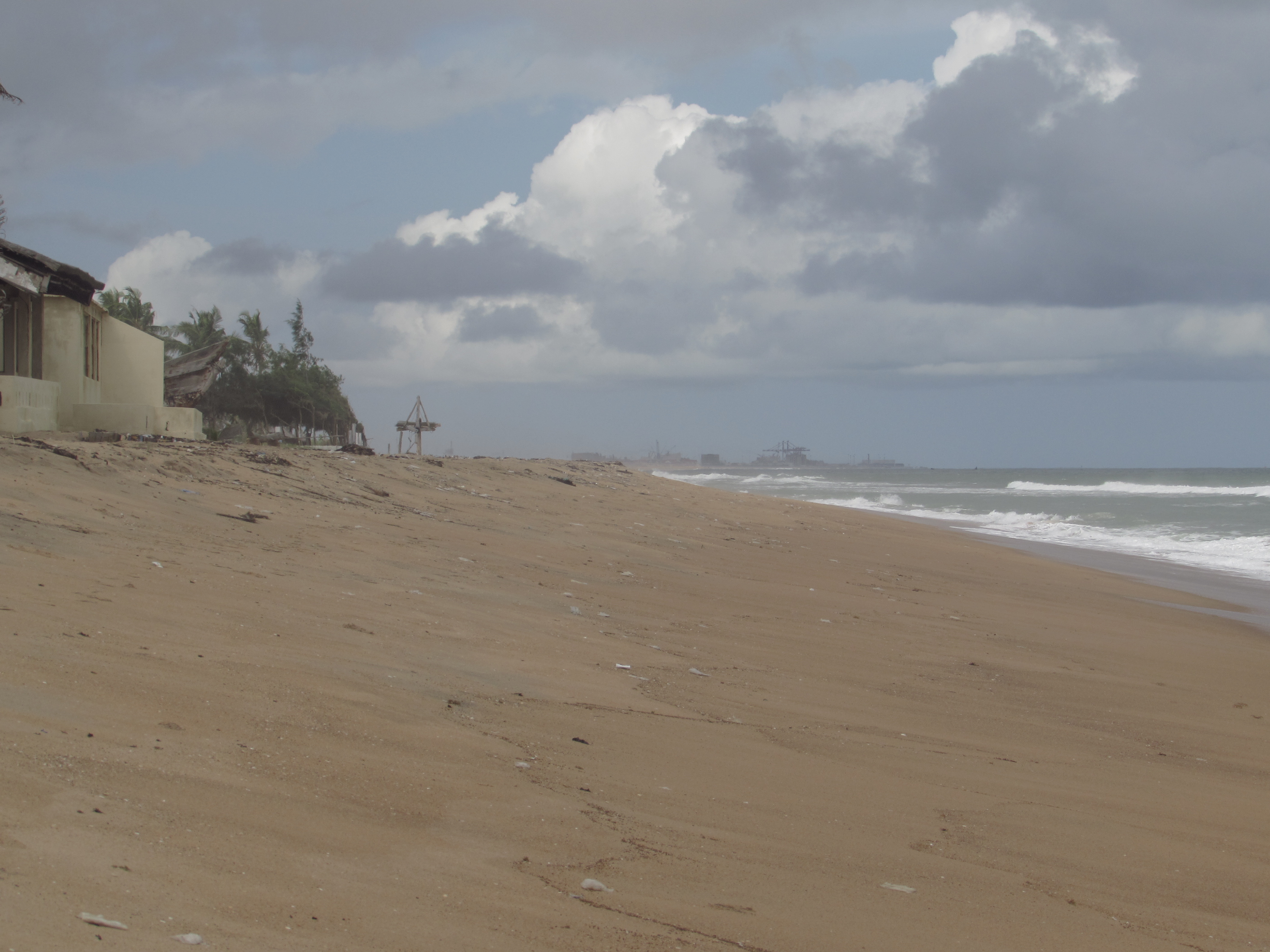
The coast of Benin with Cotonou port in the background

The Bight of Benin has a long association with slavery, its shore being known as the Slave Coast. From 1807 onwards—after slave trading was made illegal for Britons—the Royal Navy created the West Africa Squadron to suppress and crush the slave trade. These efforts were magnified after 1833 when slave trading was made illegal throughout the British Empire. These efforts would continue until the 1890s and cost Britain significant sums of money, and the Royal Navy hundreds, if not thousands, of sailors’ lives from tropical diseases.

The old Royal Navy rhyme says:

Beware, beware the Bight of the Benin, for few come out though many go in.

A variation goes:

Beware beware, the Bight of Benin: one comes out, where fifty went in!

This is said to be about the risk of malaria in the Bight. A third version of the couplet is:

Beware and take care of the Bight of Benin. There's one comes out for forty goes in."

In R. Austin Freeman's 1927 novel A Certain Dr. Thorndyke, Chapter II, "The Legatee," mention is made of this location. The scene is the Gold Coast colony in Africa where the character Larkom asks, "How does the old mariners' ditty run? You remember it. 'Oh, the Bight of Benin, the Bight of Benin, One comes out where three go in.'" Life expectancy was short in this locale due to the prevalence of Blackwater fever.

The author Philip McCutchan has written a book titled Beware, beware the Bight of Benin.

A short story by Elizabeth Coatsworth, "The Forgotten Island" (1942), deals with a treasure from Benin. A variation of the rhyme is also mentioned.

Flash For Freedom!, George MacDonald Fraser's 1971 picaresque novel of Harry Flashman's misadventures in—among other places and situations—an English stately home, the 1840s slave trade, antebellum plantation life, and meeting with then-congressman Abraham Lincoln, quotes another variant of the couplet:

Oh, sailor beware of the Bight o' Benin.

There's one as comes out for a hundred goes in.

In Patrick O'Brian's novel The Commodore (1996), Dr. Maturin recites the rhyme when he learns of his ship's destination. Commodore Aubrey checks him, telling him it is bad luck to say that out loud on the way in.

The rhyme is also partially quoted in chapter Context(6) of John Brunner's 1968 novel Stand on Zanzibar. The Bight of Benin (as well as the fictional republic of Beninia) is mentioned throughout the novel.

David Bramhall's series of novels "The Greatest Cape" also mentions the rhyme, one of the characters in the first volume, The Black Joke, having been a pirate and a slaver.

In 2007, a collection of short stories entitled The Bight of Benin: Short Fiction by Kelly J. Morris was published by AtacoraPress.com. The stories are set in Ghana, Togo, Benin and Nigeria.

== History ==
On 1 February 1852, the British established the Bight of Benin British protectorate, under the authority of Consuls of the Bight of Benin: the republic of Benin and Bight of Benin were named after the Kingdom of Benin extending eastward from Cape St. Paul to the Nun outlet of River Niger.

Term	Protectorate
May 1852 – 1853	Louis Fraser
1853 – April 1859	Benjamin Campbell
April 1859 – 1860	George Brand
1860 – January 1861	Henry Hand
January 1861 – May 1861	Henry Grant Foote
May 1861 – 6 August 1861	William McCoskry (acting)

On 6 August 1861, the Bight of Biafra protectorate and Bight of Benin protectorate were joined as a united British protectorate, ultimately to be merged into Nigeria.

== References and sources ==
Sources

- WorldStatesmen- Southern Nigeria
