= Mono River =

Major river of eastern Togo

Coordinates: 6.2959°N 1.9299°E

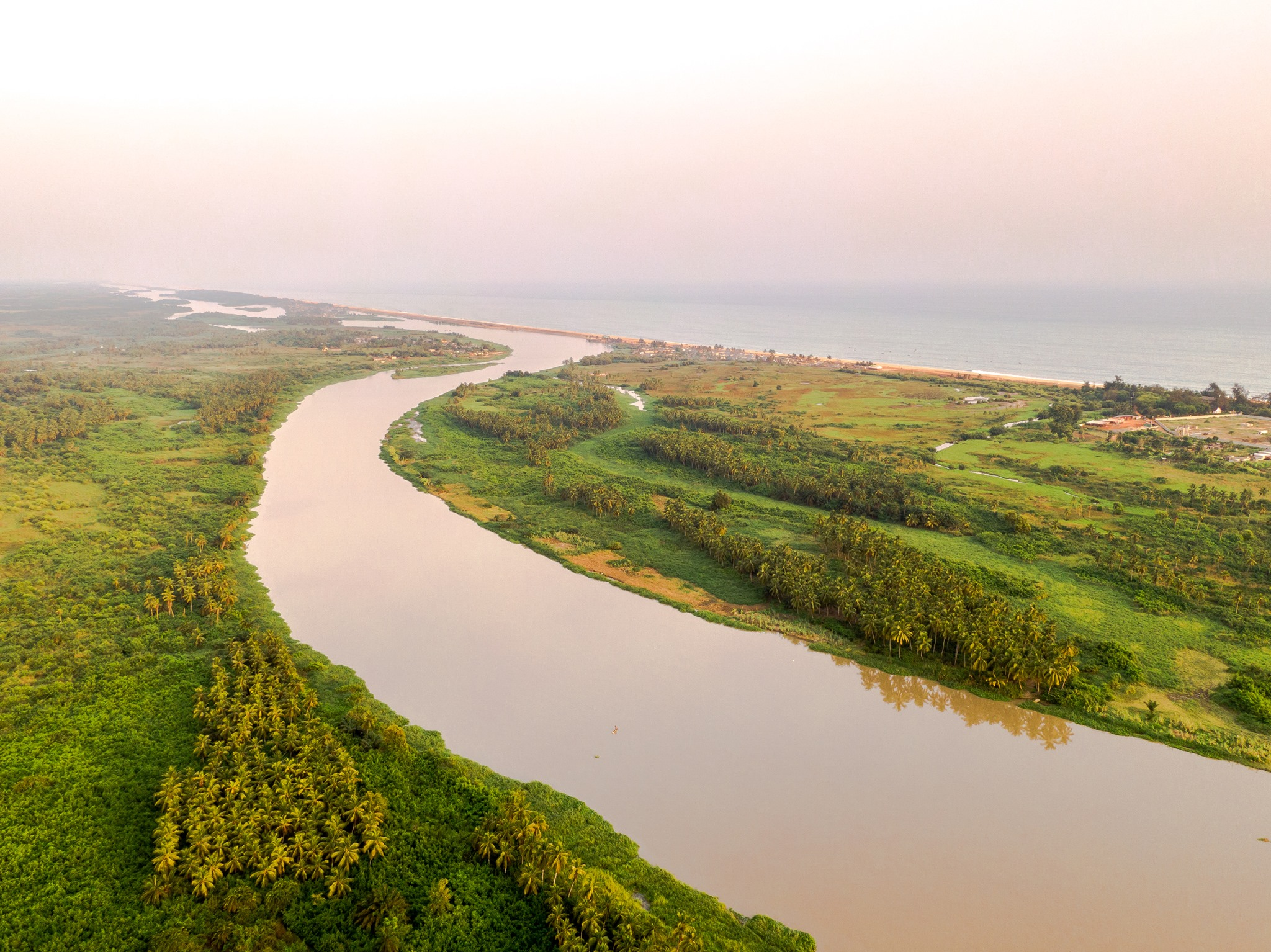
Mono River mouth area in Grand-Popo area, Benin.

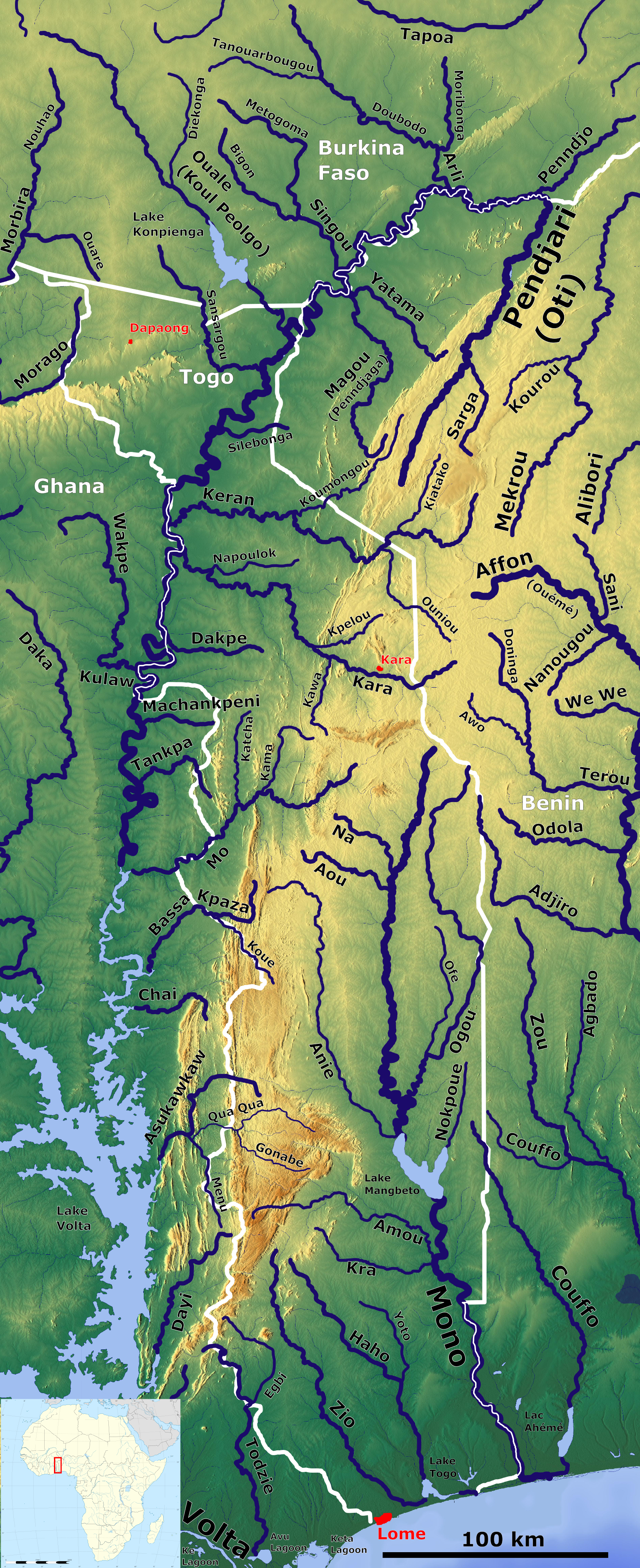
Togo with the Oti River (north) and the Mono River (south)

The Mono River is the major river of eastern Togo.

Approximately 400 km (250 mi) long, and draining a basin of about 20,000 km^{2} (7,700 sq mi), it rises between the town of Sokodé and the border with Benin, and flows south. Along the southern portion of the river towards its mouth, it forms the international boundary between Togo and Benin. The river drains into the Bight of Benin through an extensive system of brackish water lagoons and lakes, including Lake Togo. Only the part of the river nearest its mouth is navigable. Most of the river's basin on the upper tableland is cultivated for maize, yams, rice, cotton and cassava.

The river is dammed 160 km (99 mi) from its mouth by the Nangbeto Dam, a partnership between Benin and Togo completed in 1987. Studies have reported economic benefits from the dam, including tourism and fishing in the lake behind it. The dam's construction displaced between 7,600 and 10,000 people, however, and studies indicate that it has substantially modified the ecology of the lagoon system at the river's mouth by reducing the natural seasonal fluctuations in river flow. A second dam project, Adjarala Dam, was proposed to be built on the river between Nangbeto and the river's mouth during the 1990s but did not receive financing until 2017 when the China-Africa Development Fund agreed to support the project. The dam's construction is part of the government's plan to increase Benin's domestic power generation capacity from 20 to 70% as most of Togo and Benin's electricity currently needs to be imported from the Akosombo Dam in Ghana.

About 35 km (22 mi) from its mouth, there are six series of rapids. Below this, the river becomes slow-moving and flows over a swampy floodplain, and there is a large area of contiguous wetland in both Togo and Benin. This area has a rich growth of reeds, sedges and grasses, and manatees, crocodiles and hippopotamus occur in the river.
