= Non-sovereign monarchy =

Type of monarchy

A non-sovereign monarchy, subnational monarchy or constituent monarchy is one in which the head of the monarchical polity (whether a geographic territory or an ethnic group), and the polity itself, are subject to a temporal authority higher than their own. The constituent states of the German Empire provides a historical example; while the Zulu king, whose power derives from the Constitution of South Africa, is a contemporary one.

== Structure and forms ==
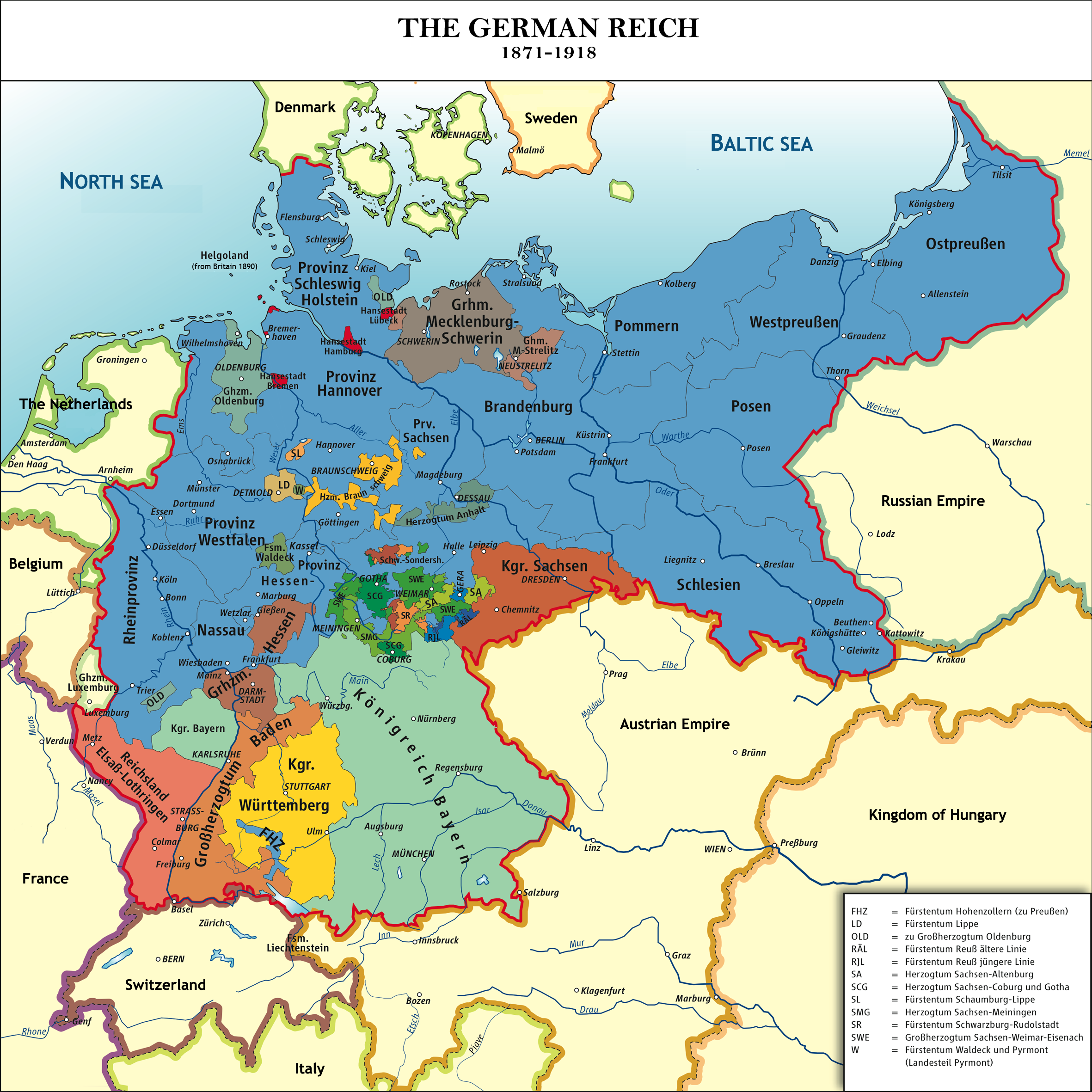
The constituent states of the German Empire (a federal monarchy). Various states were formally suzerain to the emperor, whose government retained authority over some policy areas throughout the federation, and was concurrently King of Prussia, the empire's largest state.

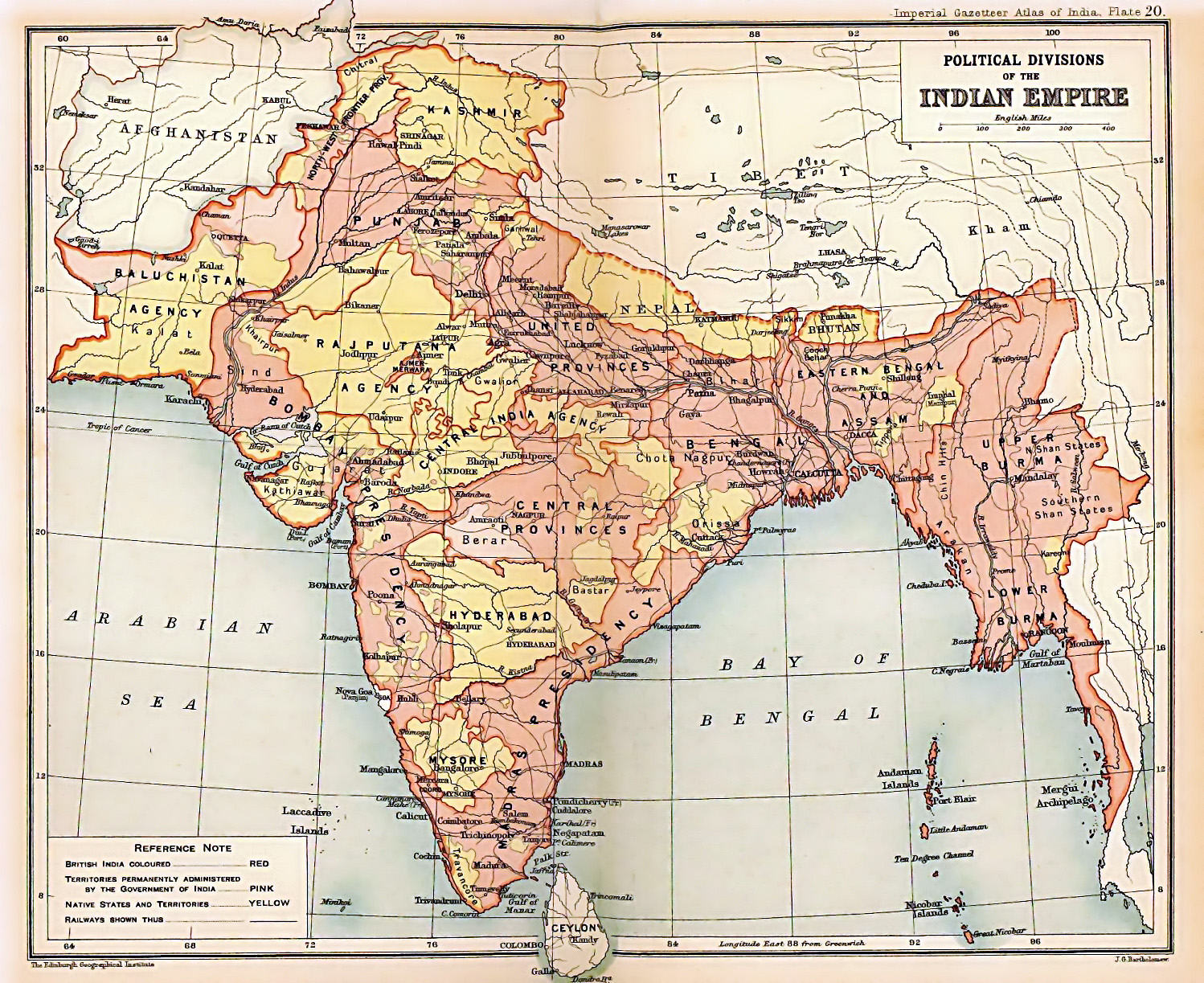
British India and the princely states within the Indian Empire. The princely states (in yellow) were sovereign territories of Indian princes who were practically suzerain to the Emperor of India, who was concurrently the British monarch, whose territories were called British India (in pink) and occupied a vast portion of the empire.

This situation can exist in a formal capacity, such as in the United Arab Emirates (in which seven historically independent emirates now serve as constituent states of a federation, the president of which is chosen from among the emirs), or in a more informal one, in which theoretically independent territories are in feudal suzerainty to stronger neighbors or foreign powers (the position of the princely states of India during British rule), and thus can be said to lack sovereignty in the sense that they cannot, for practical purposes, conduct their affairs of state unhampered. The most formalized arrangement is known as a federal monarchy, in which the relationship between smaller constituent monarchies and the central government (which may or may not have a territory of its own) parallels that of states to a federal government in republics, such as the United States of America. Like sovereign monarchies, there exist both hereditary and elective non-sovereigns.

Systems of both formal and informal suzerainty were common before the 20th century, when monarchical systems were used by most states often originating from the feudal fiefdoms of the Middle Ages. During the last century, however, many monarchies have become republics, and those who remain are generally the formal sovereigns of their nations. Sub-national monarchies also exist in a few states which are, in and of themselves, not monarchical, (generally for the purpose of fostering national traditions).

The degree to which the monarchs have control over their polities varies greatly—in some they may have a great degree of domestic authority (as in the United Arab Emirates), while others have little or no policy-making power (the case with numerous ethnic monarchs today). In some, the monarch's position might be purely traditional or cultural in nature, without any formal constitutional authority at all.

== Contemporary institutions ==
=== France ===
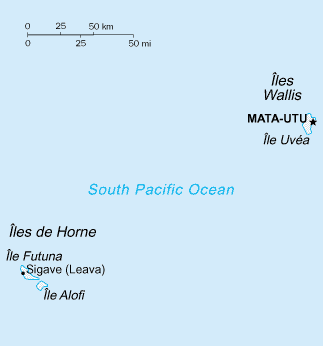
The islands that make up Wallis and Futuna

Wallis and Futuna is an overseas collectivity of the French Republic in Polynesia consisting of three main islands (Wallis, Futuna, and the mostly uninhabited Alofi) and a number of tiny islets. The collectivity is made up of three traditional kingdoms: Uvea, on the island of Wallis, Sigave, on the western part of the island of Futuna, and Alo, on the island of Alofi and on the eastern part of the island of Futuna. The current co-claimants to the title King of Uvea are Felice Tominiko Halagahu and Patalione Kanimoa, the current King of Alo is Filipo Katoa and the current King of Sigave is Eufenio Takala. They have been reigning since 2016.

The territory was annexed by the French Republic in 1888, and was placed under the authority of another French colony, New Caledonia. The inhabitants of the islands voted in a 1959 referendum to become an overseas collectivity of France, effective in 1961. The collectivity is governed as a parliamentary republic in which the citizens elect a Territorial Assembly, the president of which becomes the head of government. His cabinet, the Council of the Territory, is made up of the three kings and three appointed ministers. In addition to this limited parliamentary role the kings play, the individual kingdoms' customary legal systems have some jurisdiction in areas of civil law.

=== Malaysia ===
A number of independent Muslim sultanates and tribal territories existed in the East Indies (the modern-day states of Malaysia, Indonesia, Singapore, and Brunei) before the coming of colonial powers in the 16th century, the most prominent one in what is now Malaysia being Melaka. The first to establish colonies were the Portuguese, but they were eventually displaced by the more powerful Dutch and British. The 1824 Anglo-Dutch Treaty defined the borders between British possessions and the Dutch East Indies. The British controlled the eastern half of modern Malaysia (in a variety of federations and colonies, see History of Malaysia) through a system of protectorates, in which native states had some domestic authority, checked by the British government. The eastern half of Malaysia was part of the independent Sultanate of Brunei until 1841, when it was granted independence as the Kingdom of Sarawak under the White Rajas. The kingdom would remain fully independent until 1888, when it accepted British protectorate status, which it retained until the last raja, Charles Vyner Brooke, ceded his rights to the United Kingdom.

The two halves were united for the first time with the formation of Malaysia in 1963. Modern Malaysia is a federal monarchy, consisting of 13 states (of which nine, known as the Malay states, are monarchical) and three federal territories. Of the Malay states, seven are sultanates (Johor, Kedah, Kelantan, Pahang, Perak, Selangor and Terengganu), one is a kingdom (Perlis), one an elective monarchy (Negeri Sembilan), while the remaining four states and the federal territories have non-monarchical systems of government. Neger Sembilan itself consists of a number of sub-state monarchial chiefdoms. The head of state of the entire federation is a constitutional monarch styled Yang di-Pertuan Agong (In English, "He who is made lord"). The Conference of Rulers, made up of the nine state monarchs and the governors of the remaining states, elects the Yang di-Pertuan from among the nine monarchs for a five-year term (the governors of the four non-monarchial states do not participate in these elections). A system of informal rotation exists between the nine state monarchs.

=== New Zealand ===
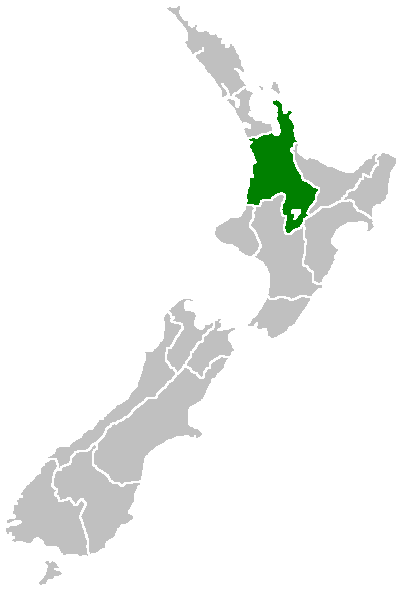
Waikato, the homeland of the Māori kings

The Māori of New Zealand lived in the autonomous territories of numerous tribes, called iwi, before the arrival of British colonialists in the mid 19th century. The Treaty of Waitangi, signed in 1840 by about a third of the Māori chiefs, made the Māori British subjects in return for (theoretical) autonomy and preservation of property rights. British encroachment on tribal lands continued, however, leading to the creation of the King movement (Māori: Kīngitanga) in an attempt to foster strength through intertribal unity. Numerous tribal chiefs refused the mantle of King, but the leader of the Tainui iwi, Pōtatau Te Wherowhero, was persuaded, and was crowned as the Māori king in 1857. The federation of tribes supporting the king fought against the British during the territorial conflicts known as the New Zealand Wars (which resulted in the confiscation of four million acres (16,000 km²) of tribal land), not emerging from their refuge in the rural region known as King Country until 1881.

The position of the Māori monarch has never had formal authority or constitutional status in New Zealand (which is itself a constitutional monarchy, as a Commonwealth realm). Before its defeat in the Land Wars, however, the King movement wielded temporal authority over large parts of the North Island and possessed some of the features of a state, including magistrates, a state newspaper called Te Hokioi, and government ministers (there was even a minister of Pākehā affairs [Pākehā being the Māori term for Europeans]). A parliament, the Kauhanganui, was set up at Maungakawa, near Cambridge, in 1889 or 1890. Today, though the monarch lacks political power, the position is invested with a great deal of mana (cultural prestige). The monarchy is elective in theory, in that there is no official dynasty or order of succession, but hereditary in practice, as every monarch chosen by the tribal chiefs has been a direct descendant of Potatau Te Wherowhero (though not always the firstborn child of the previous ruler). Their Māori monarch does not have a physical crown: the "coronation" is performed by tapping the ascendant on the forehead with a Bible (the same Bible has been used for every monarch since Te Wherowhero).

The eighth and current Māori monarch is queen Nga wai hono i te po. She was crowned on 5 September 2024, following the death on 30 August of her father, King Tūheitia.

=== Nigeria ===
The non-sovereign monarchs of Nigeria, known locally as the traditional rulers, serve the twin contemporary functions of fostering traditional preservation in the wake of globalisation and representing their people in their dealings with the official government, which in turn serves to recognise their titles. They have very little in the way of technical authority, but are in possession of real influence in practice due to their control of popular opinion within the various tribes. In addition to this a number of them, such as the sultan of Sokoto and the Ooni of Ife, retain their spiritual authority as religious leaders of significant parts of the country in question's population.

=== South Africa ===
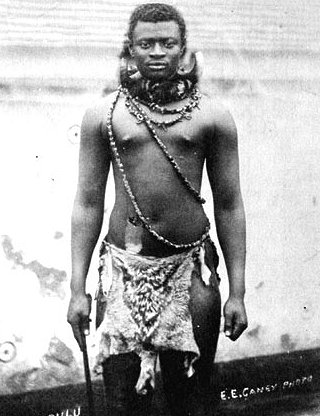
Dinzulu kaCetshwayo, the last king of an independent Zulu state, in 1883

The Zulu Kingdom was the independent nation state of the Zulu people, founded by Shaka kaSenzangakhona in 1816. The kingdom was a major regional power for most of the 19th century, but eventually was drawn into conflict with the expanding British Empire, and after a reduction in territory after defeat in the Anglo-Zulu War, lost its independence in 1887, when it was incorporated into the Natal Colony, and later the Union of South Africa.

The Zulu kings remained pretenders to their officially abolished thrones during the 20th century, but were granted official authority by the Traditional Leadership Clause of the republican Constitution of South Africa. The constitution recognizes the right of "traditional authorities" to operate by and amend systems of customary law, and directs the courts to apply these laws as applicable. It also empowers the national and provincial legislatures to formally establish houses for and councils of traditional leaders. The Zulu king is head of this council of tribal chiefs, known as the Ubukhosi. In 2005, the KwaZulu-Natal provincial government officially recognised the Zulu king as the province's official ceremonial monarch and head of state, establishing the province as a constitutional monarchy within South Africa.

The current Zulu king is Misuzulu Zulu, who reigns as king of the Zulu nation, rather than of Zululand, which is today part of the South African province of KwaZulu-Natal. Zulu ascended the throne in 2021.

=== United Arab Emirates ===
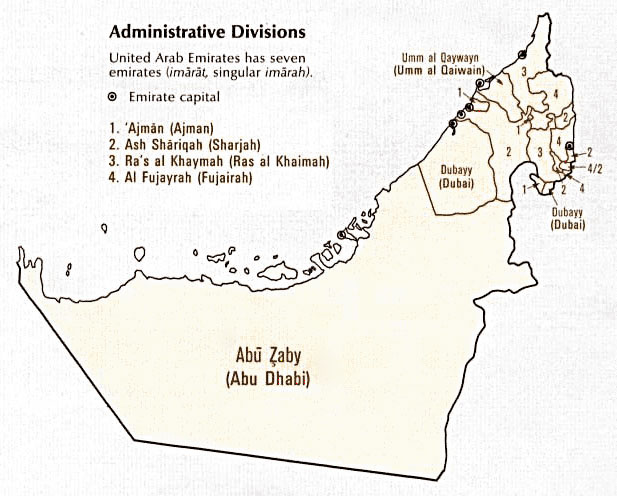
Subdivisions of the United Arab Emirates

The numerous small sheikdoms on the Persian Gulf were under informal suzerainty to the Ottoman Empire during the 16th century. Later, this dominance gradually shifted to the United Kingdom. In 1853 the rulers signed a Perpetual Maritime Truce, and from that point onward delegated disputes between themselves to the British for arbitration (it is from this arrangement that the territory's former title, the "Trucial" States was derived). In 1892 this arrangement was formalized into a protectorate in which the British assumed responsibility for the emirate's protection. This arrangement existed until 1971, when the United Arab Emirates was granted independence.

The seven constituent emirates of the UAE are Abu Dhabi, Ajman, Dubai, Fujairah, Ras al-Khaimah, Sharjah, and Umm al-Quwain. As in Malaysia, the head of state is chosen by and from the constituent rulers: the emirs of the seven emirates form the Federal Supreme Council, which selects the president and the vice president of the United Arab Emirates. In practice, the Council retains the emir of Abu Dhabi as the president, and the emir of Dubai has traditionally held a vice presidential post, as well as the role of prime minister, who is formally appointed by the president.

=== Uganda ===
The 17 currently recognised kingdoms in Uganda

In 1888, during the Scramble for Africa, the powerful Bantu kingdom of Buganda was placed under the administration of the Imperial British East Africa Company. In 1894, however, the company relinquished its rights to the territory to the British government, which expanded its control to the neighboring kingdoms of Toro, Ankole, Busoga, Bunyoro and tribal territories in establishing the Uganda Protectorate, which was maintained until independence was granted in 1961.

Shortly after achieving independence, Uganda became a republic, and its first years were characterized by a power struggle between the Uganda People's Congress and the Bugandan nationalist and monarchist Kabaka Yekka Party. Edward Muteesa II, the king of Buganda, was appointed president and commander of the armed forces, but in 1967 Prime Minister Apollo Milton Obote staged a coup against the Bugandan king in the Battle of Mengo Hill. During Obote's subsequent rule the monarchies were abolished, and remained so during the rule of Idi Amin as well.

Restoration of the traditional monarchies came in 1993. The restored monarchies are cultural in nature, and their kings do not have policy-making power. The Kingdom of Rwenzururu, which did not exist before the 1966 abolition, was officially established in 2008. The areas which now make up the kingdom were formerly part of the Kingdom of Toro. The region is populated by Konjo and Amba peoples, whose territory was incorporated into the Kingdom of Toro by the British. A secession movement existed during Uganda's early years of independence, and after a 2005 report from the Ugandan government found that the great majority of the regions inhabitants favored the creation of a Rwenzururu monarchy, the kingdom was recognized by the Ugandan cabinet on March 17, 2008. A number of other monarchies have also been restored or established across Uganda since 1993.

== See also ==
- List of current non-sovereign monarchs
