= Hounkpati B Christophe Capo =

Beninese linguist, and professor of linguistics

Hounkpatin B Christophe Capo
- Born: 1953 (age 72–73)
- Occupations: Linguist, University professor
- Known for: linguistics of Gbe languages
- Notable work: Renaissance du Gbe (réflexions critiques et constructives sur L'Eve, le Fon, le Gen, l'Aja, le Gun, etc.), Linguistique Constructive en Afrique Noire, Précis phonologique du gbe: une perspective comparative, A Comparative Phonology of Gbe, A classification of the languages of Benin

Hounkpati B Christophe Capo (born January 1, 1953) is a Beninese linguist, and professor of linguistics at the University of Abomey-Calavi in the Republic of Benin.

== Biography ==
Hounkpati B Christophe Capo has a humanities degree (1974) and a master's degree in linguistics (1977) from the National University of Benin (UNB), a Master of Arts (1977) and a Ph.D. in linguistics from the University of Ghana (1981). He taught and collaborated at several universities in West Africa, notably the universities of Benin City and Ilorin in Nigeria in 1978.

Hired as an assistant professor in 1986 at the National University of Benin, he was then promoted several times within the Conseil africain et malgache de l'enseignement supérieur (CAMES). Permanent interim secretary of the scientific council of the National University of Benin from 1994 to 1999, he was decorated as a knight of the national order of Benin in 1995 and became an officer of national order of Benin in 2008.

Married with five children, reputed research professor, scientific director of Labo-Gbe, international laboratory of Gbe languages (Gadomè, Bénin), he has written seven books, thirteen book chapters and more than fifty articles in scientific reviews. He is a member of several learned societies including the Société Linguistique de l'Afrique de l'Ouest (SLAO) (Linguistic Society of West Africa) and the Institut International de Recherche et de Formation (INIREF) (International Institute of Research and Training) in Cotonou, Benin and an editor or assistant editor of several international scientific journals. He has guided several doctoral theses in Benin and elsewhere and contributed to the promotions of several colleagues in his department.

Capo is the assistant director of the doctoral multidisciplinary school of the Faculty of Letters, Arts and Social Sciences of Aplahoué in Kouffo Department in southwest Benin, an entity of the university of Abomey-Calavi.

Hounkpati B Christophe Capo conducted research and taught in the linguistics departments and centers for african studies at several universities : University of Cologne (Germany), Cornell University (US), University of Gainesville (US), Ohio State University (US), Massachusetts Institute of Technology (US), Université du Québec à Montréal (Canada), CASAS South Africa, University of Ghana (Lagon), University of Hamburg (Germany), University of Frankfurt (Germany), University of Bayreuth (Germany), University of Bremen (Germany).

He has been associated with the development association of Comé since 2002 and is a sitting councillor there as well.

== Works ==
Hounkpati B Christophe Capo has worked on the rehabilitation of the languages of the Gbe dialectal continuum, previously known as the Aja-Eve languages of the Gulf of Benin in West Africa. Beginning in 1930, publications on the Gbe languages rapidly appeared, the vast majority on individual Gbe languages.

Capo set out a classification of the Gbe languages and a reconstruction of the phonology of proto-Gbe. Much of the comparative research for this classification was carried out by Capo in the 1970s, and partial results were published in the 1970s and early 1980s as articles on specific phonological developments in various branches of the Gbe dialectal continuum, and notably as a standard spelling for Gbe languages.

His first major work, Renaissance du Gbe (1988), published a classification of the Gbe languages for the first time. In 1991, he published Comparative phonology of Gbe. In this period, he also founded the Labo Gbe (Int.), the Laboratoire de recherche sur les langues Gbe (Research Laboratory on Gbe Languages) based in Benin, which promotes research and has published several articles and documents on Gbe languages. The Labo Gbe, in Gadomè on the Cotonou-Lomé road 40 km from Cotonou, has an impressive collection of documentation and a scientific journal titled Etudes Gbe – Gbe Studies.

== Publications ==
- 1982: Hounkpati B.C. Capo : « Le Gbe est une langue unique » (Gbe Is A Unique Language), Africa, Journal of the International African Institute; London.
- 1988: Hounkpati B.C. Capo : Dix ans de publications en linguistique (1977-1987) (Ten Years of Publications in Linguistics (1977-1987)), Garome, Laboratoire international des parlers Gbe (International Laboratory of Gbe Speakers), OCLC 31281655
- 1988: Hounkpati B.C. Capo : Renaissance du Gbe (réflexions critiques et constructives sur L'Eve, le Fon, le Gen, l'Aja, le Gun, etc.), Hamburg: Helmut Buske Verlag ISBN 978-3-8711-8847-3.
- 1989: Hounkpati B.C. Capo : Linguistique Constructive en Afrique Noire, Hamburg, Helmut Buske Verlag ISBN 978-3-8711-8918-0.
- 1989: Hounkpati B.C. Capo : Précis phonologique du gbe: une perspective comparative. AAP- Afrikanistische Arbeitspapiere, No 19 (Cologne.) OCLC 760804705
- 1991: Hounkpati B.C. Capo : A Comparative Phonology of Gbe, Publications in African Languages and Linguistics, 14. Berlin/New York: Foris Publications and Garome, Bénin: Labo Gbe (Int.) ISBN 978-3-1101-3392-9
- 1998: Hounkpati B.C. Capo : A classification of the languages of Benin, Florida Hills, Vivlia ISBN 978-1-9197-9909-4
- 2000: Hounkpati B.C. Capo : The New Ewe Orthography: Based on the Gbe Uniform Standard Orthography (GUSO), The Centre for Advanced Studies of African Society (CASAS), South Africa ISBN 978-1-9197-9936-0.
- 2002: Hounkpati B.C. Capo : The pan-dialectal approach to orthographic conventions: the case of the Gbe languages of West Africa, in PRAH, Kwesi Kwaa. 2002. Writing African : the harmonisation of orthographic conventions in African languages. Cape Town : Centre for Advanced Studies of African Society (CASAS). ISBN 1919799664
- 2005: Hounkpati B.C. Capo, Bedou-Jondoh Edith, Bolouvi Lebene-Philippe, Gagnon Daniel, Gbeto Flavien, Gnamiato Victorie, Kinhou Severin-Marie, Semadegbe Jules, Tohoun Benjamin. L'orthographe harmonisée des langues Gbe du Ghana, du Togo, du Benin et du Nigeria. Cape Town : Centre for Advanced Studies of African Society (CASAS), 31 p. ISBN 1919932224.
- 2009: Hounkpati B.C. Capo, Flavien Gbéto et Adrien Huannou : Langues africaines dans l'enseignement au Bénin : problèmes et perspectives, Cape Town, Centre for Advanced Studies of African Society (CASAS) - Garome, Laboratoire international gbe (LABO GBE) OCLC 660187984.

== Publications ==
Capo has published articles in the following journals :

- Language et Devenir (Benin)
- Cahiers d'Études Linguistiques (Benin)
- Journal of West African Languages (USA)
- Journal of African Languages and Linguistics
- Linguistique Africaine (Paris)
- Études Gbe – Gbe Studies (Benin)
- Annales de l'Université d'Abidjan (Ivory Coast)
- Revue québécoise de linguistique (Canada)
- Studies in African Linguistics
- Afrika und Übersee (Germany)
- AAP: Afrikanistische Arbeitspapiere (Cologne)
- SUGIA Sprache un Geschichte in Afrika (Cologne)
- Africa, Journal of the International African Institute. (London).

== See also ==
- Ayizo language
- Gbe languages
- Phla–Pherá languages
- Orthographe uniforme standard du gbe (in French)
