= Tɔli language =

Gbe language of Benin

Tɔli
- Tɔli-gbe
- Native to: Benin
- Language family: Niger–Congo?: Atlantic–Congo; Volta–Niger; Gbe; Phla–Pherá; Tɔli

Official status
- Recognised minority language in: Benin

Language codes
- ISO 639-3: (covered by Gun guw)
- Glottolog: toli1243

Tɔli (Toli) is a Gbe language of Benin. Ethnologue counts it and Alada as dialects of Gun, but Capo (1988) considers it one of the Phla–Pherá languages. Glottolog places it as a dialect of Tofin.
