= Phla–Pherá languages =

Proposed Gbe language group

Phla–Pherá
- Xwla–Xwela
- Geographic distribution: southeastern Ghana, southern Togo & Benin, and southwestern Nigeria
- Linguistic classification: Niger–Congo?: Atlantic–Congo; Volta–Congo; Kwa; Volta–Niger; Gbe; Phla–Pherá

Language codes
- Glottolog: east2845 Eastern west2934 Western
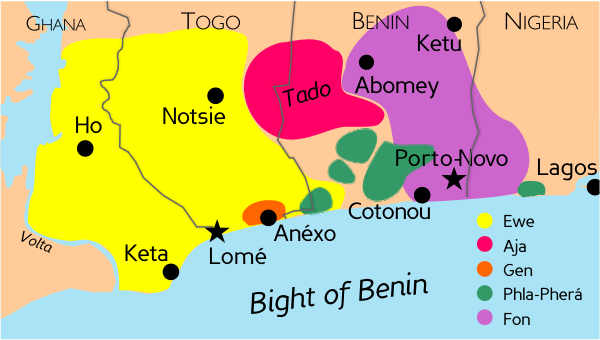
- The Gbe language area. Green spots are languages of the Phla–Pherá cluster according to Capo (1988).

The Phla–Pherá (Xwla–Xwela) languages form a possible group of Gbe languages spoken mainly in southeastern and southwestern Benin; some communities are found in southeastern Togo and southwestern Nigeria. The group, comprising about ten varieties, was introduced by H.B. Capo in his 1988 classification of Gbe languages as one of the five main branches of Gbe. Additional research carried out by SIL International in the nineties corroborated many of Capo's findings and led to adjustment of some of his more tentative groupings; in particular, Phla–Pherá was divided in an eastern and a western cluster. Phla–Pherá is one of the smaller Gbe branches in terms of number of speakers. It is also the most linguistically diverse branch of Gbe, due partly to the existence of several geographically separated communities, but mainly because of considerable influence by several non-Gbe languages in the past. Some of the Phla–Pherá peoples are thought to be the original inhabitants of the region having intermingled with Gbe immigrants.

The term Phla–Pherá is a conjunction of the names of two major dialects of this grouping. There exist many spelling variants of both names (Xwla (Phla) and Xwela (Phera)).

== Geography and demography ==
Most Phla–Pherá languages are spoken in the Mono, Atlantique, and Oueme (Weme) provinces of Benin. Alada, a lect that is sometimes included in the Phla–Pherá group, is spoken in southwestern Nigeria just southeast of Benin's administrative capital Porto-Novo. One Phla–Pherá language, Xwla (pronounced [xʷla]), is spoken west of the Mono river, along the coast between Anexo (Togo) and Grand Popo (Benin); this language has been called Popo in the past. Fon in its various shapes, representing another branch of Gbe, is the dominant language in this area and communities of Phla–Pherá speakers are scattered across the Fon area.

The Phla–Pherá languages are among the least investigated of the Gbe languages. In some cases, barely more is known than the name of a dialect and the village where it is spoken. Because of this, it is difficult to determine the total number of speakers of Phla–Pherá languages. A tentative approximation, based on the scanty demographic data available in the Ethnologue, is 400 000 speakers excluding Alada, or 600 000 to 700 000 including Alada.

== Capo's initial classification ==
Much of the comparative research for Hounkpati B.C. Capo's influential classification of the Gbe languages was carried out in the seventies, and partial results trickled down in the late seventies and early eighties in the form of articles on specific phonological developments in various branches of Gbe. In his 1988 work Renaissance du Gbe, the internal classification of Gbe was published in full for the first time (part of the introduction in his 1991 A Comparative Phonology of Gbe is an English translation of this). In this classification, Phla–Pherá is considered one of the five branches of Gbe, the others being Ewe, Gen, Fon, and Ajá. According to Capo (1988:15), the Phla–Pherá group consists of the following lects:

- Alada (Allada, Arda) – southwest Nigeria, southeast of Porto-Novo.
- Tɔli (Tori) – Atlantique and Weme Province, west of the Alada area.
- Tɔfin (Toffi, Tofin) – Weme province, Benin, north of Nokoué Lake.
- Phelá (Fida, Péda, Xwela, Phera) – east of Lake Ahémé in the Atlantique province of Benin.
- Phla (Pla, Xwla, Hwla, Popo) – in the coastal borderland of Togo and Benin, between Anexo and Grand Popo.
- Ayizɔ (Ayizo, Ayize) – Atlantique province, Benin.
- Kotafon (Kotafohn) – Mono Province, Benin.
- Gbési (Gbesi) – Mono province, north of Ahéme Lake, Benin.
- Tsáphɛ (Sahwe, Saxwe) – northern Mono province, Benin.
- Sɛ (Se) – west Mono province, Benin.

Ayizɔ, Gbesi (gbesiin) and Kotafɔn (kógbè) are the same basic language.

Capo grouped the Phla–Pherá lects mainly on the basis of a number of shared phonological and morphological features, including the development of proto-Gbe *tʰ and *dʱ into /s/ and /z/, the retained distinction between *ɛ and *e, and the occurrence of various nominal prefixes.

Capo noted that ‘the name Phla–Pherá is not used by speakers of the various lects which it comprises’ and that ‘in fact, the Phla–Pherá section is less unified than the others’. However, according to Capo, their speakers ‘recognise a closer link between the lects listed here than between any of those listed in other [branches]’. He marked the Alada variety as an exception, as some people 'consider Alada and the Fon language Gun to be one and the same language'.

== Subsequent research ==
In the early nineties, the Summer Institute of Linguistics initiated a study to assess which Gbe communities could benefit from existing literacy efforts and whether additional development programs in some of the remaining communities would be needed. Linguistic research carried out in the course of this study was to shed more light on the relations between the various varieties of Gbe. Some of the results of this study were presented in Kluge (2000, 2005, 2006).

Based on a synchronic analysis of lexical and grammatical features elicited among 49 Gbe varieties, Kluge divided the Gbe languages into three major groupings: western, central, and eastern. The eastern grouping consists of three clusters: Fon (roughly equivalent to Capo's 'Fon' branch), western Phla–Phera, and eastern Phla–Phera (together roughly equivalent to Capo's Phla–Pherá languages). Among other things, this part of Kluge's analysis confirmed the uncertainty of the classification of the Alada dialect: some possible results point to inclusion in the Fon group, while others suggest membership of one of the Phla–Pherá clusters. Likewise, Kluge's results indicate uncertainty regarding the classification of Ayizo and Kotafon.

A number of lects considered by Kluge were not included in Capo's research (cf. Capo 1991:14ff), namely Ajra, Daxe, Gbesi, Gbokpa, Movolo, Se, and Seto, all of which Kluge (2000:32, 2005:41ff,47, 2006:74ff,79) classified as Phla–Phera.

== Linguistic diversity ==
Just like Capo readily admitted the considerable diversity of the Phla–Pherá branch, Kluge's analysis did not result in conclusive evidence regarding the exact make-up of the western and eastern Phla–Pherá branches – various modes of computation yielded different configurations of the respective dialects (cf. 2000:62–3, 2005:45ff). The diversity in this subfamily is probably due in part to the fact that the various Phla–Pherá communities do not occupy one specific geographical area but are scattered along the coast of the Bight of Benin.

However, a more substantial reason for the noted diversity is one of historical nature. In a 1979 work on the history of the Gbe peoples (called Adjatado back then), the Catholic missionary Roberto Pazzi pointed out that 'three dialects emerged from the half-breeding between immigrant groups and the indigenes from Tádó: they are Gɛ̀n, Sáhwè and Xweɖá.' The latter two dialects are part of Capo's Phla–Pherá branch, and Capo adds that Tsáphɛ and Phelá have Cábɛ (Yoruboid) and E̟do respectively as substrata. This contact and intermingling of non-Gbe peoples with Gbe peoples and the influence of this processes on language inevitably diffuses the picture presented by comparative linguistic research. Further research into the historical origins of the Phla and Pherá peoples has yet to take place.

Due to the uncertainty about the internal structure of the eastern Gbe major grouping, the Ethnologue has omitted Phla–Pherá altogether from its subclassification of Gbe languages. Some of the lects of Capo's and Kluge's Phla–Pherá are included in other branches (for example, Xwla is found under Aja) while others are not included in any subgroup of Gbe (e.g. Xwela).

== Notes and references ==
=== Notes ===
1. Failure to recognize Hwla as a spelling variant seems to have caused the listing of this Phla–Pherá language as 'unclassified' on the Ethnologue, as was pointed out by Angela Kluge (2000:104); this was rectified in the 15th edition.
2. Capo 1991:4.
3. Capo 1991:14.
4. Kluge 2000:72, 2005:32ff, 2006:69ff.
5. Kluge 2000:63, 2005:41ff, 2006:74ff.
6. Compare Kluge 2005:41ff,47 and Kluge 2006:74ff,79.
7. Pazzi 1979:17, as translated in Capo 1991:10.
8. Cf. Capo 1991:10, Kluge 2000:71–2, 2005:49.

=== References ===
- Afeli, Kossi A. and Bolouvi, Lebene Ph. (1998) 'Les langues du Togo, mutuellement intelligibles' (Notes and records no. 5, Communications of the Centre for Advanced Studies of African Society). Cape Town:CASAS.
- Capo, Hounkpati B.C. (1988) Renaissance du Gbe (réflexions critiques et constructives sur L’EVE, le FON, le GEN, l AJA, le GUN, etc.) . Hamburg: Helmut Buske Verlag.
- Capo, Hounkpati B.C. (1991) A Comparative Phonology of Gbe, Publications in African Languages and Linguistics, 14. Berlin/New York: Foris Publications & Garome, Bénin: Labo Gbe (Int)
- Capo, Hounkpati B.C. (1998) ‘A classification of the languages of Benin’ (Notes and records no. 4, Communications of the Centre for Advanced Studies of African Society). Cape Town:CASAS.
- Kluge, Angela (2000) ‘The Gbe language varieties of West Africa – a quantitative analysis of lexical and grammatical features’. [unpublished MA thesis, University of Wales, College of Cardiff].
- Kluge, Angela (2005) ‘A synchronic lexical study of Gbe language varieties: The effects of different similarity judgment criteria’ Linguistic Discovery 3, 1, 22-53.
- Kluge, Angela (2006) ‘Qualitative and quantitative analysis of grammatical features elicited among the Gbe language varieties of West Africa’ Journal of African Languages and Linguistics 27, 1, 53-86.
- Pazzi, R. (1979) Introduction à l'histoire de l'aire culturelle Ajatado (Etudes et Documents de Sciences Humaines 1, Institut National des Sciences de L'Education). Lomé: University of Benin.
