= GBX =

GBX may refer to:

- Eastern Xwla Gbe language of Benin and Togo (ISO 639-3 code: gbx)
- Gaboxadol, a hypnotic and hallucinogen
- The Greenbrier Companies, American rolling stock corporation
- An unofficial code for £0.01 (a penny); see Pound sterling § Currency code
