= Ayizo language =

Language group of Benin

Ayizo Kotafon Gbesi
- Native to: Benin
- Native speakers: 400,000 (2002–2006)
- Language family: Niger–Congo?: Atlantic–Congo; Volta–Niger; Gbe; Phla–Pherá?; Ayizo Kotafon Gbesi

Language codes
- ISO 639-3: Variously: ayb – Ayizo kqk – Kotafon gbs – Gbesi
- Glottolog: ayiz1245 Ayizo kota1272 Kotafon gbes1238 Gbesi

The Ayizo languages (Ayizɔ) are Gbe languages spoken in Benin. They are Ayizo, Kotafon, and Gbesi.

== Distribution ==
The Ayizo languages are spoken in Benin across and near the Mono River, in the Departments of Atlantique, Kouffo, Mono, Oueme, and parts of the Zou Department.

== Classification ==
The Ayizo languages are classified in the Phla–Phera languages, a group of the Gbe languages. The Ayizo languages are:

- Ayizo
- Kotafon
- Gbesi

The Saxwe language was previously classified as an Ayizo language.

Additionally, the Ayizo languages can also be known as the Ayizo–Kotafon–Gbesi languages to distinguish it with the Ayizo language proper.

== Orthography ==
The Ayizo alphabet is based on the Latin alphabet, with the addition of the letters Ɖ/ɖ, Ɛ/ɛ, and Ɔ/ɔ, and the digraphs gb, hw, kp, ny, and xw.

Ayizo alphabet
	a	b	c	d	ɖ	e	ɛ	f	g	gb	h	hw	i	j	k	kp	l	m	n	ny	o	ɔ	p	r	s	t	u	v	w	x	xw	y	z
Sound (IPA)	a	b	t͡ɕ	d	ɖ	e	ɛ	f	ɡ	ɡb	ɣ	ɣʷ	i	d͡ʑ	k	kp	l	m	n	ɲ	o	ɔ	p	r	s	t	u	v	w	x	xʷ	j	z

=== Tone marking ===
Tones are marked as follows:

- Acute accent marks the rising tone: xó, dó
- Grave accent marks the falling tone: ɖò, akpàkpà
- Caron marks falling and rising tone: bǔ, bǐ
- Circumflex accent marks the rising and falling tone: côfù
- Macron marks the neutral tone: kān

Tones are fully marked in reference books, but not always marked in other writing. The tone marking is phonemic, and the actual pronunciation may be different according to the syllable's environment.
