= Alada language =

Gbe language of Nigeria and Benin

Alada
- Native to: Nigeria, Benin
- Native speakers: (459,000 "Gun" in Nigeria, 2020)
- Language family: Niger–Congo?: Atlantic–Congo; Volta–Niger; Gbe; Phla–Pherá?; Alada

Official status
- Recognised minority language in: Benin

Language codes
- ISO 639-3: (included in Gun [guw])
- Glottolog: alad1239

Alada (Arba) is a Gbe language of Nigeria and Benin that has proven difficult to classify. Ethnologue counts Alada and Tɔli as dialects of Gun, but Capo (1988) considers it one of the Phla–Pherá languages. Kluge (2000) found elements of both Fon–Gun and Phla–Pherá. It is considered to be a dialect of Wudu by Glottolog.
