= Adja language =

Gbe language spoken in Western Africa

Aja
- Adja, Hwè
- Native to: Benin, Togo, Ghana, Nigeria, Gabon
- Ethnicity: Aja people
- Native speakers: 1.28 million (2012–2021)
- Language family: Niger–Congo?: Atlantic–Congo; Volta-Congo; Kwa; Gbe; Aja
- Dialects: Dogbo; Hwe; Tado; Sikpi; Tala
- Writing system: Latin

Official status
- Recognised minority language in: Benin

Language codes
- ISO 639-3: ajg
- Glottolog: ajab1235
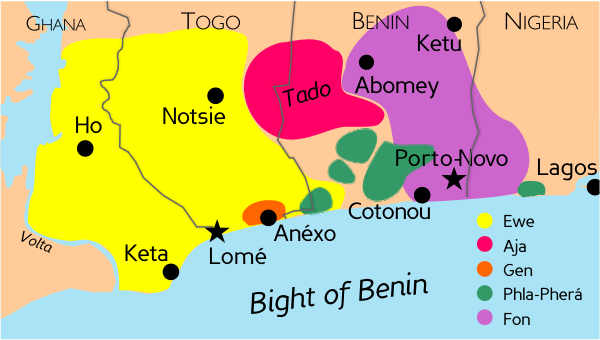
- The distribution of the major Gbe dialect areas (after Capo 1988, 1991)

The Aja language (also called Adja or Ajagbe) is a Gbe language spoken by the Aja people of Benin and Togo. It is also reported to be spoken in Ghana, Nigeria and Gabon.

It is related to other Gbe languages such as Ewe, Mina, Fon, and the Phla–Pherá languages.

== Geographic distribution ==
A 1996 sociolinguistic survey found Adja speakers spread out around the Mono River in the Togo-Benin border region, and extending eastward to the Kouffo River in Benin. Within Benin, Adja speakers mostly live in villages whose residents speak a variety of languages, not only Adja. 1.2 million people spoke Adja according to a 2023 estimate.

Adja is not generally a language of formal instruction, though at least one primary school in Benin teaches bilingually, using Adja alongside French. Informal education and literacy classes in Adja are more common, and began to be offered in 1977 in Benin. An alphabetic writing system for Adja was introduced in the 1960s and revised in the 1970s. The Beninese government designed primers for Adja literacy in the 1990s.

== Phonology ==
=== Consonants ===
Adja has 23 consonant phonemes, plus three nasal consonants that appear as contextually-determined variants. These three are listed in brackets in the table below:

		Labial	Alveolar	Retroflex	Post-alv./ Palatal	Velar	Labial- velar	Uvular
Nasal		[m]	[n]		[ɲ]	ŋ		
Plosive/ Affricate	voiceless	p	t		t͡ʃ	k	k͡p	
Plosive/ Affricate	voiced	b	d	ɖ	d͡ʒ	ɡ	ɡ͡b	
Fricative	voiceless	f	s		ʃ			χ
Fricative	voiced	v	z			ɣ		ʁ
Approximant			l		j		w	

- Voiced consonants /b, ɖ, j/ are nasalized into [m, n, ɲ] when followed by a nasal vowel.
- /l/ is heard as a rhotic trill [r] when after alveolar, retroflex or post-alveolar consonants.
- A palatalization process converts /s/ and /z/ to post-alveolar [ʃ], [ʒ] when preceding /i/.

=== Vowels ===
Adja has twelve vowel phonemes. Five vowel qualities have both oral and nasal phonemes, while two vowel qualities are strictly oral (the open-mid vowels ɛ and ɔ). Nasalization spreads right to left from a nasalized vowel to liquids, glides, and certain consonants.

Oral vowels
	Front	Central	Back
Close	i		u
Close-mid	e		o
Open-mid	ɛ		ɔ
Open		a	

Nasal vowels
	Front	Central	Back
Close	ĩ		ũ
Open-mid	ɛ̃		ɔ̃
Open		ã	

=== Tone ===
Adja is a register tone language, with two tone levels: high and low. Syllables can be underlying specified for tone, or left unspecified in the lexicon. If tone is unspecified for a given syllable, the tone spreads from left to right. Tone is marked in writing by accents: kúkù (chef) has a high-low tone sequence.

=== Phonotactics ===
Syllables in Adja consist of an optional onset, a nucleus, and highly-restricted coda. The onset can range from zero to three consonantal phonemes, but non-liquids can only occur as the initial consonant. Nuclei can be a monophthong vowel or a syllabic nasal. The only acceptable coda is [ŋ].

== Writing system ==
Adja uses a Latin script alphabetic writing system, including some characters from the International Phonetic Alphabet (IPA). The Adja letters generally correspond to their IPA pronunciations, with a few exceptions: ⟨h⟩, ⟨x⟩, ⟨sh⟩, ⟨y⟩ correspond to [ʁ], [χ], [ʃ], and [j] respectively.

== Syntax ==
The basic word order of Adja is subject–auxiliary-verb–object. Focused elements in an utterance (e.g., new or important information) can be marked either syntactically (moving the focus to the front of the utterance, with an optional focus marker yí), or morphologically (with a range of particles).

== Sample text ==
=== Article 1 of the Universal Declaration of Human Rights ===
==== Aja ====
Agbetɔwo pleŋu vanɔ gbɛmɛ ko vovoɖeka gbeswɛgbeswɛ, sɔto amɛnyinyi ko acɛwo gomɛ; wo xɔnɔ susunywin ko jimɛnywi so esexwe. Wo ɖo a wa nɔvi ɖaɖa wowo nɔnɔwo gbɔ.

==== Ewe ====
Wodzi amegbetɔwo katã ablɔɖeviwoe eye wodzena bubu kple gomekpɔkpɔ sɔsɔe. Susu kple dzitsinya le wo dometɔ ɖesiaɖe si eyata wodze be woanɔ anyi le ɖekawɔwɔ blibo me.

==== English ====
All human beings are born free and equal in dignity and rights. They are endowed with reason and conscience and should act towards one another in a spirit of brotherhood.
