= Mabelle Prior =

Swiss Ghanaian/Togolese origin (born 1976)

- Born: March 17, 1976 (age 50)

Mabelle Prior (born March 17, 1976) is a Swiss Ghanaian/Togolese former broadcast journalist and producer of women's and children's programmes in the 1990s on Ghana Broadcasting Corporation. She is popularly known as 'Ghana's Queen of the Airwaves'.

== Career ==
Mabelle worked as a reporter at the Volta Regional Branch of the Ghana Broadcasting Corporation from 1996 to 2000. She moved to Switzerland where she continued to work in journalism for a while before becoming the first young black lady on the Federatif Committee of Migration and the first young black lady in the Federatif Committee of Women. She has also worked on BIEL International Fashion projects, a platform for promoting multicultural inter-nationality in Biel and Switzerland. Mabelle is presently the editorial director of Swiss Glamour Celebrities magazine.

== Languages ==
Mabelle speaks six languages: Ewe, Twi, Mina, French, English and German.

== Association Swiss Most Beautiful ==
Mabelle is the president and founder of Association Swiss Most Beautiful. Established in 2014, ASMB organizes an annual Miss Swiss Most Beautiful pageant. The event aims to promote diversity in women's beauty.
