= Pherá language =

Gbe language of Benin

Pherá
- Xwela
- Pronunciation: χʷèɺá
- Native to: Benin
- Native speakers: 85,000 (2018)
- Language family: Niger–Congo?: Atlantic–Congo; Volta–Niger; Gbe; Phla–Pherá; Pherá

Official status
- Recognised minority language in: Benin

Language codes
- ISO 639-3: xwe
- Glottolog: xwel1235

Pherá, also spelled Xwela, is a Gbe language of Benin. It forms a dialect chain with Western Phla.
