= Wudu language =

Niger-Congo language spoken in Togo

Wudu
- Native to: Togo
- Region: Near Atakpamé, Amou Prefecture, Plateaux Region
- Native speakers: 2,500 (2019)
- Language family: Niger-Congo: Atlantic-Congo; Volta-Congo; Kwa; Gbe; Wudu

Language codes
- ISO 639-3: wud
- Glottolog: wudu1238

Wudu is a language spoken in Togo. It is part of a dialect continuum which also includes Ewe and Gen.
