= Saxwe language =

Gbe language spoken in Benin

Saxwɛ
- Tsáphɛ
- Native to: Benin
- Region: Atlantique Department, Mono Department
- Native speakers: 320,000 (2021)
- Language family: Niger–Congo?: Atlantic–Congo; Volta–Niger; Gbe; Phla–Pherá; Saxwɛ
- Dialects: Sɛ; Daxe; Saxwe
- Writing system: Latin

Language codes
- ISO 639-3: sxw
- Glottolog: saxw1241

Saxwɛ, also spelled Tsáphɛ, is a Gbe language spoken by the Saxwe people of south-western Benin.

== Geographical distribution ==
Saxwe is spoken in the communes of Kpomassè in the Atlantique Department, the commune of Lalo in Couffo department, and the communes of Bopa and Houéyogbé in the Mono Department.

== Sources ==
- Beavon-Ham, Virginia (2019). Tone in Saxwe. 543. LOT. ISBN 978-94-6093-328-8.
- Johnson, Eric C (2011). A sociolinguistic survey of the Gbe language communities of Benin and Togo: Volume 8: Saxwe, Daxe and Se language areas. Electronic Survey Report 2011-020. SIL International.
- Kluge, Angela (2011). A sociolinguistic survey of the Gbe language communities of Benin and Togo: Gbe language family overview. Electronic Survey Report 2011-012. SIL International.
