= Telephone numbers in Benin =

- Country: Benin
- Continent: Africa
- NSN length: 8
- Format: yyxx xxxx
- Country code: +229
- International access: 00

Telephone numbers in Benin follow an eight-digit telephone numbering plan administered under the country calling code +229. The plan organises numbers by geographic region, with area codes assigned to Benin's various departments. Mobile numbers are allocated to operators including MTN, Moov, and SBIN. Beginning 30 November 2024, all existing telephone numbers in Benin were updated to include the prefix "01" in front of existing numbers.

== Calling formats ==
- yyxx xxxx Calls within Benin
- +229 yyxx xxxx Calls from outside Benin

The NSN length is eight digits.

Beginning 30 November 2024, all existing telephone numbers in Benin will add "01" in front of them.

== List of area codes in Benin ==
LIST OF REGIONS
Area/Region	Area Code
Atacora, Donga, Alibori, Borgou	23
Littoral, Atlantique	21
Mono, Couffo, Zou, Collines	22
Ouémé, Plateau	20

DETAILED LIST OF FIXED ALLOCATIONS IN 2005
City/Town	Old Number	New Number
Ouémé, Plateau
Ongala	21 XXXX	20 21 XXXX
Kandiévé	22 XXXX	20 22 XXXX
Sèmè	24 XXXX	20 24 XXXX
Pobè, Kétou	25 XXXX	20 25 XXXX
Sakété, Igolo	26 XXXX	20 26 XXXX
Adjohoun	27 XXXX	20 27 XXXX
Fixed cellular	29 XXXX	20 29 XXXX
Littoral, Atlantique
Cadjehoun	30 XXXX	21 30 XXXX
Ganhi	31 XXXX	21 31 XXXX
Jéricho	32 XXXX	21 32 XXXX
Akpakpa	33 XXXX	21 33 XXXX
Ouidah	34 XXXX	21 34 XXXX
Godomey	35 XXXX	21 35 XXXX
Abomey-Calaci	36 XXXX	21 36 XXXX
Allada	37 XXXX	21 37 XXXX
Kouhounou Fixe	38 XXXX	21 38 XXXX
Fixed cellular	39 XXXX	21 39 XXXX
Maritime radio	73 6XXX	21 73 6XXX
Mono, Couffo, Zou, Collines
Lokossa	41 XXXX	22 41 XXXX
Come	43 XXXX	22 43 XXXX
Dogbo	46 XXXX	22 46 XXXX
Fixed cellular	49 XXXX	22 49 XXXX
Abomey	50 XXXX	22 50 XXXX
Bohicon	51 XXXX	22 51 XXXX
Covè	52 XXXX	22 52 XXXX
Dassa-Zoumé	53 XXXX	22 53 XXXX
Savalou	54 XXXX	22 54 XXXX
Savè	55 XXXX	22 55 XXXX
Fixed cellular	59 XXXX	22 59 XXXX
Atacora, Donga, Alibori, Borgou
Parakou	61 XXXX	23 61 XXXX
Nikki, Ndali	62 XXXX	23 62 XXXX
Kandi, Gogounou, Ségbana	63 XXXX	23 63 XXXX
Banikoara	65 XXXX	23 65 XXXX
Malanville	67 XXXX	23 67 XXXX
Djougou	80 XXXX	23 80 XXXX
Natitingou	82 XXXX	23 82 XXXX
Tanguiéta	83 XXXX	23 83 XXXX

== Mobile phone numbers ==
Mobile phone numbers in Benin are prefixed by:

Prefix	Operator
40–41	SBIN
42	MTN
43–44	SBIN
45	Moov
46	MTN
47	SBIN
50–59	MTN
60	Moov
61–62	MTN
63–65	Moov
66–67	MTN
68	Moov
69	MTN
90–91	MTN
93	BLK
94–95	Moov
96–97	MTN
98–99	Moov
