= Tofin language =

Gbe language spoken in Benin

Tɔfin
- Toffi
- tɔfingbè
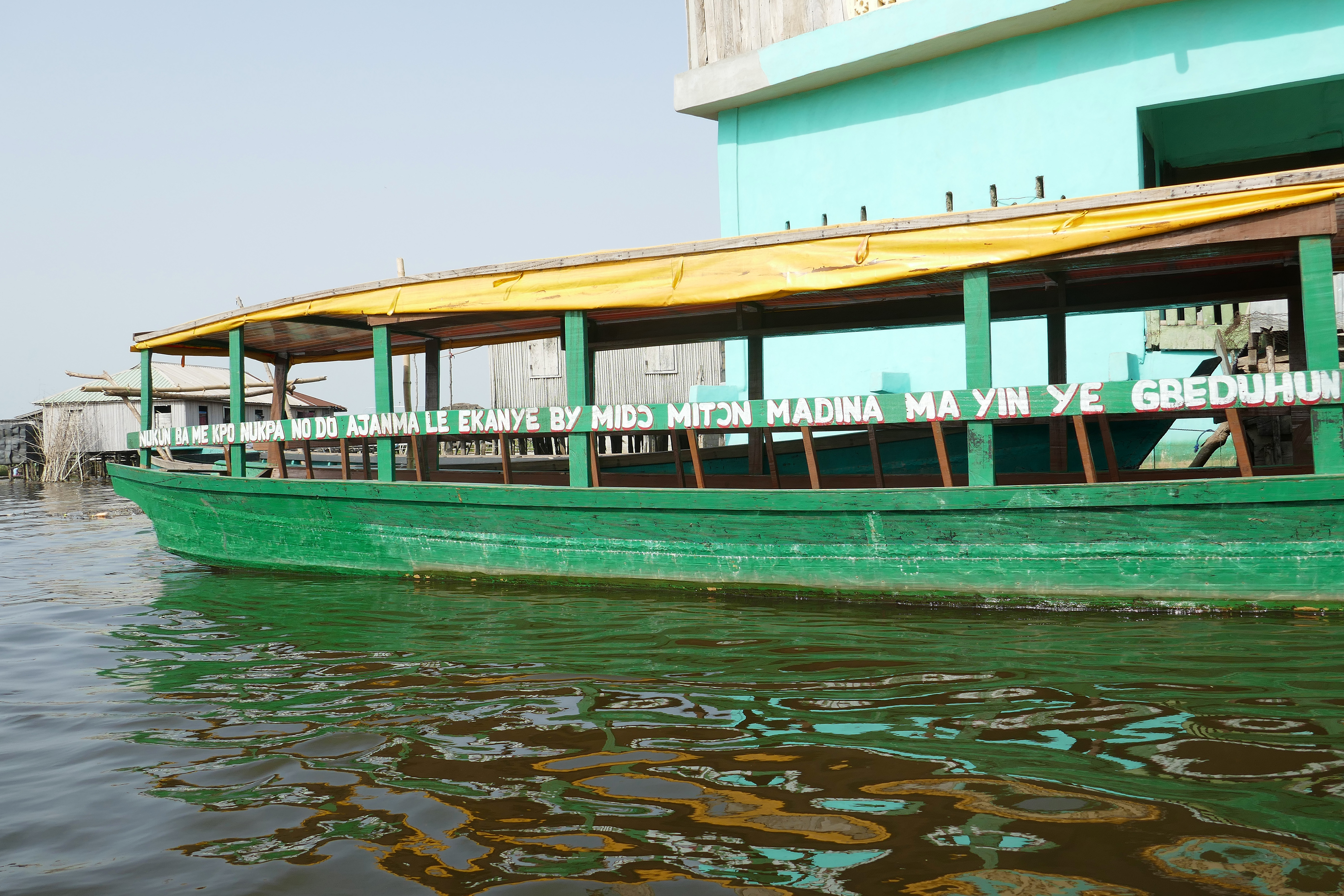
- Tofin inscription on a boat in Ganvie
- Native to: Benin
- Native speakers: 66,000 (2006)
- Language family: Niger–Congo?: Atlantic–Congo; Volta–Niger; Gbe; Phla–Pherá; Tɔfin

Official status
- Recognised minority language in: Benin

Language codes
- ISO 639-3: tfi
- Glottolog: tofi1235

People speaking Tofin near Ganvié

Tɔfin (Toffi) is a Gbe language of Benin.
