= Gbe languages =

Niger–Congo language cluster

Gbe
- Geographic distribution: West Africa (parts of Ghana, Togo, Benin, Nigeria)
- Ethnicity: Tado
- Linguistic classification: Niger–Congo?: Atlantic-Congo; Volta–Congo; Volta–Niger; Gbe
- Proto-language: Proto-Gbe
- Subdivisions: Ewe; Gen; Fon; Adja; Phla–Pherá

Language codes
- Glottolog: gbee1241
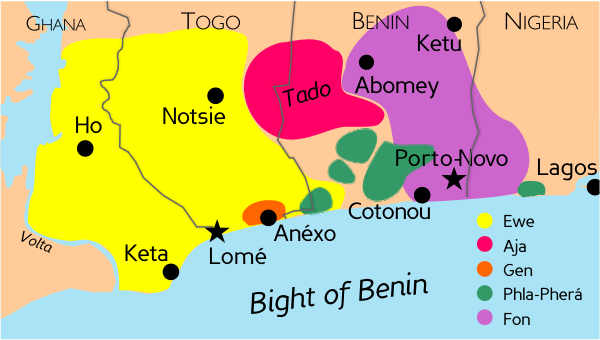
- Map showing the distribution of the major Gbe dialect areas (after Capo 1988, 1991).

The Gbe languages (pronounced [ɡ͡bè]) form a cluster of about twenty related languages stretching across the area between eastern Ghana and western Nigeria. The total number of speakers of Gbe languages is between four and eight million. The most widely spoken Gbe language is Ewe (10.3 million speakers in Ghana and Togo), followed by Fon (5 million, mainly in Benin). The Gbe languages were traditionally placed in the Kwa branch of the Niger–Congo languages, but more recently have been classified as Volta–Niger languages. They include five major dialect clusters: Ewe, Fon, Aja, Gen (Mina), and Phla–Pherá.

Most of the Gbe peoples came from the east to their present dwelling-places in several migrations between the tenth and the fifteenth century. Some of the Phla–Pherá peoples however are thought to be the original inhabitants of the area who have intermingled with the Gbe immigrants, and the Gen people probably originate from the Ga-Adangbe people in Ghana. In the late eighteenth century, many speakers of Gbe were enslaved and transported to the New World: it is believed that Gbe languages played some role in the genesis of several Caribbean creole languages, especially Haitian Creole and Sranantongo (Surinamese Creole).

Around 1840, German missionaries started linguistic research into the Gbe languages. In the first half of the twentieth century, the Africanist Diedrich Hermann Westermann was one of the most prolific contributors to the study of Gbe. The first internal classification of the Gbe languages was published in 1988 by H.B. Capo, followed by a comparative phonology in 1991. The Gbe languages are tonal, isolating languages and the basic word order is subject–verb–object.

== Languages ==
=== Geography and demography ===
The Gbe language area is bordered to the west and east by the Volta River in Ghana and the Weme River in Benin. The northern border is between 6 and 8 degrees latitude and the southern border is the Atlantic coast. The area is neighbored mainly by Kwa languages, except for the east and north-east, where Yorùbá is spoken. To the west, Ga–Dangme, Guang and Akan are spoken. To the north, it is bordered by Adele, Aguna, Akpafu, Lolobi, and Yorùbá.

Estimates of the total number of speakers of Gbe languages vary considerably. Capo (1988) gives a modest estimate of four million, while SIL's Ethnologue (15th edition, 2005) gives eight million. The most widely spoken Gbe languages are Ewe (Ghana and Togo) and Fon (Benin, eastern Togo) at four million and 3 million speakers, respectively. Ewe is a language of formal education for secondary schools and universities in Ghana, and is also used in non-formal education in Togo. In Benin, Aja (740,000 speakers) and Fon were two of the six national languages selected by the government for adult education in 1992.

=== Classification ===
Greenberg, following Westermann (1952), placed the Gbe languages in the Kwa family of the Niger–Congo languages. The extent of the Kwa branch has fluctuated through the years, and Roger Blench places the Gbe languages in a Volta–Niger branch with former East Kwa languages to their east.

Gbe is a dialect continuum. Based on comparative research, Capo (1988) divides it into five clusters, with each cluster consisting of several mutually intelligible dialects. The borders between the clusters are not always distinct. The five clusters are:

Name	Alternate names	Speakers	Some dialects	Region
Ewe	Vhe, Ɛ̀ʋɛ̀ gbè	ca. 3,600,000	Anlo-(Keta area)Along the coast, Ewedome, (Ho area) Hill country, Tongu (Sogakope area) along the Volta River	lower half of Ghana east of the Volta River; southwest Togo
Gen	Gẽ, Mina, Gɛn gbe	ca. 400,000	Gliji, Anexo, Agoi	Lake Togo, around Anexo
Aja	Aja gbe, Adja	ca. 500,000	Dogbo, Sikpi	Togo, Benin area, inland along the Mono River
Fon	Fɔn gbè	ca. 1,700,000	Gun, Kpase, Agbome, Maxi	southeast Togo, Benin west of the Weme River and along the coast
Phla–Pherá	Fla, Offra, Xwla gbe	ca. 400,000	Alada, Toli, Ayizo	Togo and Benin along the coast and around Lake Ahémé

Kluge (2011) proposes that the Gbe languages consist of a dialect continuum that can be split into three large clusters.

- Western Gbe varieties (Ewe, Gen, and Northwestern Gbe): Adan, Agoi/Gliji, Agu, Anexo, Aveno, Awlan, Be, Gbin, Gen, Kpelen, Kpési, Togo, Vhlin, Vo, Waci, Wance, Wundi (also Awuna?)
- Central Gbe varieties: Aja (Dogbo, Hwe, Sikpi, Tado, Tala)
- Eastern Gbe varieties (Fon, Eastern Phla–Pherá, and Western Phla–Pherá): Agbome, Ajra, Alada, Arohun, Ayizo, Ci, Daxe, Fon, Gbekon, Gbesi, Gbokpa, Gun, Kotafon, Kpase, Maxi, Movolo, Saxwe, Se, Seto, Tofin, Toli, Weme, Xwela, Xwla (Eastern), Xwla (Western) (also Wudu?)

=== Naming ===
The dialect continuum as a whole was called 'Ewe' by Westermann, the most influential researcher on the cluster, who used the term 'Standard Ewe' to refer to the written form of the language. Other linguists have called the Gbe languages as a whole 'Aja', after the name of the local language of the Aja-Tado area in Benin. However, use of this single language's name for the language cluster as a whole was not only not acceptable to all speakers but also rather confusing. Since the establishment of a working group at the West African Languages Congress at Cotonou in 1980, H. B. Capo's name suggestion has been generally accepted: Gbe, which is the word for 'language/dialect' in each of the languages.

== History ==
=== Before 1600 ===
Ketu, settlement in present-day Benin Republic (formerly known as Dahomey), might be an appropriate starting point for a brief history of the Gbe-speaking peoples. Ewe traditions refer to Ketu as Amedzofe ("origin of humanity") or Mawufe ("home of the Supreme Being"). It is believed that the inhabitants of Ketu were pressed westward by a series of wars between the tenth and the thirteenth century. In Ketu, the ancestors of the Gbe-speaking peoples separated themselves from other refugees and began to establish their own identity.

Attacks between the thirteenth and the fifteenth century drove a large section of the group still further westward. They settled in the ancient kingdom of Tado (also Stado or Stádó) on the Mono river (in present-day Togo). The Tado kingdom was an important state in West Africa up to the late fifteenth century.

In the course of the thirteenth or fourteenth century, the Notsie (or Notsé, Notsye, Wancé) kingdom was established by emigrants from the Tado kingdom; Notsie would later (around 1500) become the home of another group of migrants from Tado, the Ewe people. Around 1550, emigrants from Tado established the Allada (or Alada) kingdom, which became the center of the Fon people. Tado is also the origin of the Aja people; in fact, the name Aja-Tado (Adja-Tado) is frequently used to refer to their language. Aja is considered the mother tribe by the rest of Gbe speaking people as many of the tribes trace their migration routes through Aja Tado(formerly known as Azame).

Other peoples that speak Gbe languages today are the Gen people (Mina, Ge) around Anexo, who are probably of Ga and Fante origin, and the Phla and Pherá peoples, some of whom consist of the traditional inhabitants of the area intermingled with early migrants from Tado.

=== European traders and the transatlantic slave trade ===
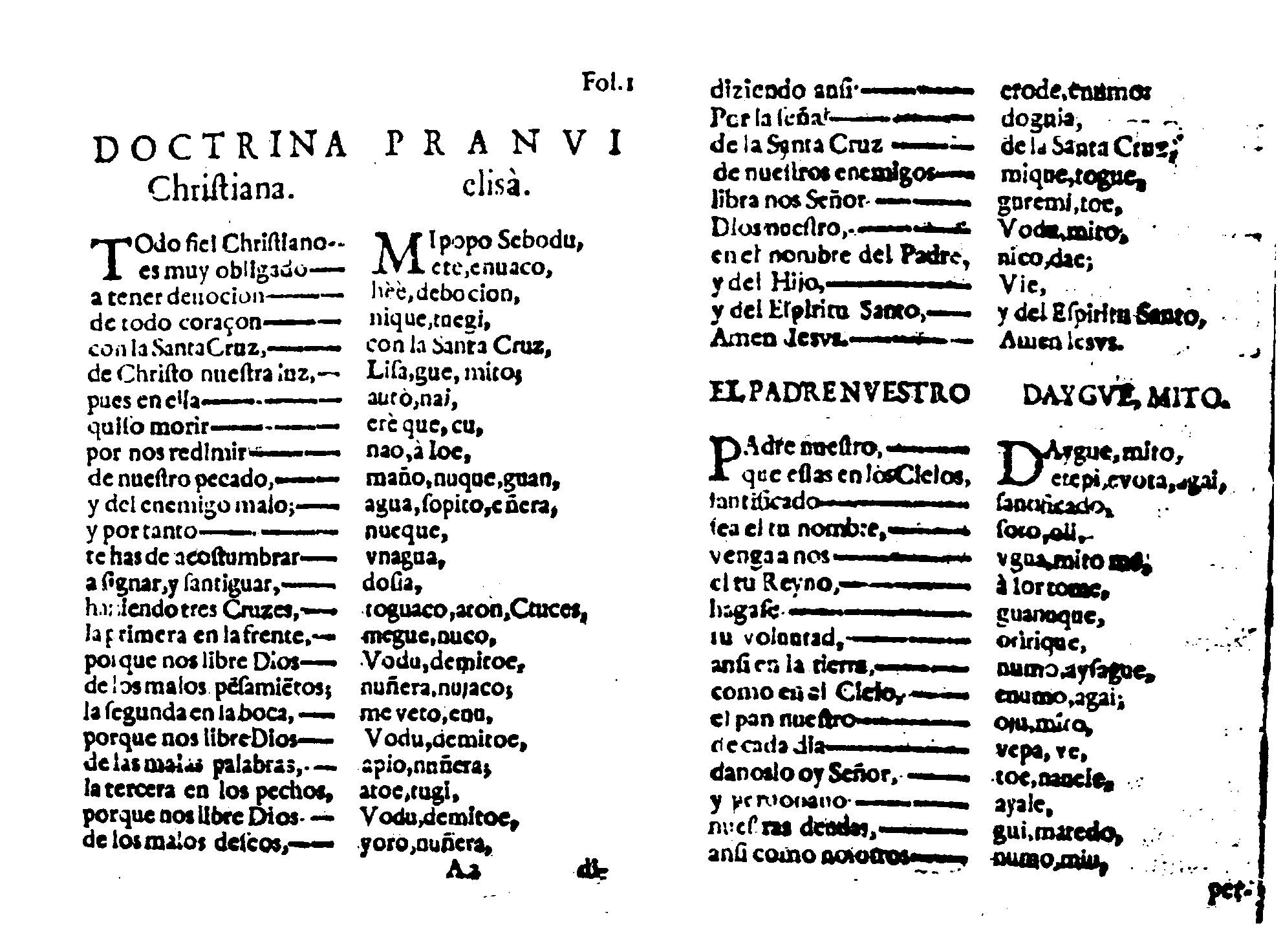
First page of the Spanish/Gen version of the 1658 Doctrina Christiana

Little is known of the history of the Gbe languages during the time that only Portuguese, Dutch and Danish traders landed on the Gold Coast (roughly 1500 to 1650). The trade of mostly gold and agricultural goods did not exercise much influence on social and cultural structures of the time. No need was felt to investigate the indigenous languages and cultures; the languages generally used in trade at this time were Portuguese and Dutch. Some loanwords remain from this period, for example atrapoe 'stairs' from Dutch trap and duku '(piece of) cloth' from Dutch doek or Danish dug. The few written accounts that stem from this period focus on trade. As more European countries established trade posts in the area, missionaries were sent out. As early as 1658, Spanish missionaries translated the Doctrina Christiana into the language of Allada, making it one of the earliest texts in any West African language. The Gbe language used in this document is thought to be a somewhat mangled form of Gen.

The relatively peaceful situation was profoundly changed with the rise of the transatlantic slave trade, which reached its peak in the late eighteenth century when as many as 15,000 slaves per year were exported from the area around Benin as part of a triangular trade between the European mainland, the west coast of Africa and the colonies of the New World (notably the Caribbean). The main actors in this process were Dutch (and to a lesser extent English) traders; captives were supplied mostly by cooperating coastal African states.

The Bight of Benin, precisely the area where the Gbe languages are spoken, was one of the centers of the slave trade at the turn of the eighteenth century. The export of 5% of the population each year resulted in overall population decline. Moreover, since the majority of the exported captives were male, the slave trade led to an imbalance in the female/male ratio. In some parts of the Slave Coast the ratio reached two adult women for every man. Several wars (sometimes deliberately provoked by European powers in order to divide and rule) further distorted social and economical relations in the area. The lack of earlier linguistic data makes it difficult to trace the inevitable linguistic changes that resulted from this turbulent period.

=== Colonisation and onwards ===
Around 1850, the transatlantic slave trade had virtually ceased. As the grip of European colonial powers strengthened, slave raiding became prohibited, trading focused on goods once more and the Europeans took it to be their calling to Christianize the colonized parts of Africa. In 1847 the Norddeutsche Missions-Gesellschaft (Bremen) started its work in Keta.

In 1857, the first Ewe grammar, Schlüssel der Ewesprache, dargeboten in den Grammatischen Grundzügen des Anlodialekts, was published by missionary J. B. Schlegel of the Bremen mission. Five different dialects of Gbe (at that time called the Ewé Language-Field) were already distinguished by Schlegel, notes Robert Needham Cust in his Modern Languages of Africa (1883). The dialects listed by Cust do not map exactly onto the five subgroups now distinguished by Capo, which is not too surprising since Cust himself admits that he relies on a multitude of often conflicting sources. Fon is in fact listed twice (once as 'the dialect of the province of Dahomé' and once as 'Fogbe').

Where previous literature consisted mostly of travel journals sometimes accompanied by short word lists, Schlegel's work marked the beginning of a period of prolific lexicographic and linguistic research into the various Gbe languages. Important writers of this period include Johann Gottlieb Christaller (Die Volta-Sprachen-Gruppe, 1888), Ernst Henrici (Lehrbuch der Ephe-Sprache, 1891, actually the first comparative Gbe grammar), J. Knüsli (Ewe-German-English Vocabulary, 1892) and Maurice Delafosse (Manuel Dahoméen (Fon), 1894).

In 1902 the missionary Diedrich Hermann Westermann contributed an article titled "Beiträge zur Kenntnis der Yewe-Sprachen in Togo" to Zeitschrift für Afrikanische und Oceanische Sprachen. Westermann became one of the most productive and influential writers on the Gbe languages, and his output dominated the Gbe literature and analysis of the first half of the twentieth century. He wrote mainly on the Western Gbe languages, especially on Ewe (though he often used the term 'Ewe' to denote the Gbe dialect continuum as a whole). Among his most important works on Ewe are his A Study of the Ewe language (1930) and Wörterbuch der Ewe-Sprache (1954).

=== Renaissance du Gbe ===
From 1930 on, publications on various Gbe languages appeared rapidly, the vast majority of them dealing with individual Gbe languages. A significant exception is formed by the extensive comparative linguistic research of Hounkpati B Christophe Capo, which resulted in an internal classification of the Gbe languages and a reconstruction of the proto-Gbe phonology. Much of the comparative research for Capo's classification of the Gbe languages was carried out in the 1970s, and partial results were published in the late 1970s and early 1980s in the form of articles on specific phonological developments in various branches of Gbe and, notably, in the form of a unified standard orthography of Gbe. In his Renaissance du Gbe (1988), the internal classification of Gbe was published in full for the first time. In 1991, Capo published a comparative phonology of Gbe. In this period, Capo also initiated Labo Gbe (Int.), the 'Laboratory for research on Gbe languages', based in Benin, which has since fostered research and published several collections of papers on the Gbe languages.

In the early 1990s, SIL International initiated a study to assess which Gbe communities could benefit from existing literacy efforts and whether additional literacy campaigns in some of the remaining communities would be needed. Synchronised linguistic research carried out in the course of this study shed more light on the relations between the various varieties of Gbe. In general, the SIL studies corroborated many of Capo's findings and led to adjustment of some of his more tentative groupings.

== Phonology ==
=== Consonants ===
The following phonetic segments are attested in Gbe languages:

Gbe languages consonants phonetic inventory (Capo 1991:39)
		Labial	Labio- dental	Lamino -interdental	Lamino- alveolar	Apico- post-alveolar	Alveolo -palatal	Palatal		Velar		Uvular	
		Labial	Labio- dental	Lamino -interdental	Lamino- alveolar	Apico- post-alveolar	Alveolo -palatal	plain	lab.	plain	lab.	plain	lab.
Nasal		m			n			ɲ		ŋ	ŋʷ		
Plosive / Affricate	voiceless	p		t	ts		tʃ			k	k͡p		
Plosive / Affricate	voiced	b		d	dz	ɖ	dʒ			ɡ	ɡ͡b		
Fricative	voiceless	ɸ	f		s		ʃ					χ	χʷ
Fricative	voiced	β	v		z		ʒ					ʁ	ʁʷ
Trill	plain					r							
Trill	nasalized					r̃							
Approximant	plain					l		j	ɥ	ɰ	w		
Approximant	nasalized					l̃		j̃	ɥ̃		w̃		

Notes

- The apico-postalveolar consonants are generally written and transcribed with the symbols for the corresponding alveolar consonants, except for the voiced stop, which uses the symbol for the voiced retroflex stop [ɖ]. This is only to distinguish it from the lamino-dental voiced stop, and is not to be interpreted as the consonant being subapical.
- The above table lists the attested phonetic segments. Some of the sounds listed here are in free variation with other sounds (e.g. r and r̃ with l and l̃). The reader is referred to the individual languages for an overview of their phoneme inventory.

No Gbe language exhibits all of the above forty-two phonetic segments. According to Capo (1991), all of them have the following twenty-three consonants in common: b, m, t, d, ɖ, n, k, g, kp, gb, ɲ, f, v, s, z, χ, ʁ, r, r̃, l, l̃, y, w.

=== Vowels ===
The following vowels are found in Gbe languages:

Phonetic inventory of vowels in Gbe languages
Capo 1991:24	Front	Central	Back
Close	i•ĩ		u•ũ
Close-mid	e•ẽ		o•õ
		ə•ə̃	
Open-mid	ɛ•ɛ̃		ɔ•ɔ̃
Open		a•ã	

In general, each Gbe variety makes use of a subset of twelve vowels, seven oral and five nasalised. The vowels /i ĩ u ũ e o ɛ̃ ɔ ɔ̃ a ã/ are attested in all Gbe languages.

Nasalization plays an important role in the vowel inventory: every vowel in the Gbe languages occurs in a non-nasalized and a nasalized form. Capo (1991) observes that the degree of nasality of nasal vowels is less when they occur after nasal consonants than after non-nasal ones.

=== Nasalization in Gbe ===
Capo (1981) has argued that nasalization in Gbe languages should be analyzed phonemically as a feature relevant to vowels and not to consonants. This means that nasal vowels are distinct from oral vowels, while nasal and voiced oral stops are treated as predictable variants. For example, non-syllabic nasal consonants are always followed by a nasal vowel, and syllabic nasal consonants are analyzed as reduced forms of consonant–vowel syllables. This analysis is in line with reconstructions of the proto-Volta–Congo language, for which similar proposals have been made.

=== Tone ===
The Gbe languages are tonal languages. In general, they have three tone levels, High (H), Mid (M), and Low (L), of which the lower two are not phonemically contrastive. Thus, the basic tonemes of Gbe are 'High' and 'Non-High', where the High toneme may be realised as High or Rising and the Non-High toneme may be realised as Low or Mid. The tones of Gbe nouns are often affected by the consonant of the noun stem. The voicing of this consonant affects the realisation of the Non-High toneme roughly as follows: If the consonant is a voiced obstruent, the Non-High toneme is realised as Low (è-ḏà 'snake') and if the consonant is a voiceless obstruent or a sonorant, the Non-High toneme is realised as Mid (ām̲ē 'person', à-f̱ī 'mouse'). The consonants that induce tonal alternations in this way are sometimes called depressor consonants.

=== Morphology ===
The basic syllable form of Gbe languages is commonly rendered (C_{1})(C_{2})V(C_{3}), meaning that there at least has to be a nucleus V, and that there are various possible configurations of consonants (C_{1-3}). The V position may be filled by any of the vowels or by a syllabic nasal. It is also the location of the tone. While virtually any consonant can occur in the C_{1} position, there exist several restrictions on the kind of consonants that can occur in the C_{2} and C_{3} positions. In general, only liquid consonants may occur as C_{2} , while only nasals occur in the C_{3} position.

Most verbs in Gbe languages have one of the basic syllable forms. Gbe nominals are generally preceded by a nominal prefix consisting of a vowel (cf. the Ewe word aɖú, 'tooth'). The quality of this vowel is restricted to the subset of non-nasal vowels. In some cases the nominal prefix is reduced to schwa or lost: the word for 'fire' is izo in Phelá, ədʒo in Wací-Ewe and dʒo in Pecí-Ewe. The nominal prefix can be seen as a relic of a typical Niger–Congo noun class system.

The Gbe languages are isolating languages, and as such express many semantic features by lexical items. Of a more agglutinative nature are the commonly used periphrastic constructions. In contrast to Bantu languages, a major branch of the Niger–Congo language family, Gbe languages have very little inflectional morphology. There is for example no subject–verb agreement whatsoever in Gbe, no gender agreement, and no inflection of nouns for number. The Gbe languages make extensive use of a rich system of tense/aspect markers.

Reduplication is a morphological process in which the root or stem of a word, or part of it, is repeated. The Gbe languages, like most Kwa languages, make extensive use of reduplication in the formation of new words, especially in deriving nouns, adjectives and adverbs from verbs. Thus in Ewe, the verb lã́, 'to cut', is nominalised by reduplication, yielding lãlã́, 'the act of cutting'. Triplication is used to intensify the meaning of adjectives and adverbs, e.g. Ewe ko 'only' → kokooko 'only, only, only'.

== Grammar ==
The basic word order of Gbe clauses is generally subject–verb–object, except in the imperfective tense and some related constructions. The Gbe languages, notably Ewe, Fon and Anlo, played a role in the genesis of several Caribbean creole languages—Haitian Creole for example is classifiable as having a French vocabulary with the syntax of a Gbe language.

The Gbe languages do not have a marked distinction between tense and aspect. The only tense that is expressed by a simple morphological marker in Gbe languages is the future tense. The future marker is ná or a, as can be seen from the examples below.

Other tenses are arrived at by means of special time adverbs or by inference from the context, and this is where the tense/aspect distinction becomes blurred. For example, what is sometimes referred to as perfective aspect in Gbe blends with the notion of past tense since it expresses an event with a definite endpoint, located in the past (see example sentences below).

ŋútsu á a ɸlè xéxí
man DET FUT buy umbrella
'the man will buy an umbrella' (Ewegbe, future marker)

ŋútsu á ɸlè xéxí
man DET buy:PFV umbrella
'the man bought an umbrella' (Ewegbe, perfective)

Focus, which is used to draw attention to a particular part of the utterance, to signify contrast or to emphasize something, is expressed in Gbe languages by leftward movement of the focused element and by way of a focus marker wɛ́ (Gungbe, Fongbe), yé (Gengbe) or é (Ewegbe), suffixed to the focused element.

àxwé yé Kòfí tù
house FOC Kofi build:PFV
'Kofi built A HOUSE' (Gengbe, focus)

Questions can be constructed in various ways in Gbe languages. A simple declarative sentence can be turned into an interrogative utterance by the use of the question marker à at the end of the sentence. Another way of forming questions is by using question words. These so-called question word questions are much akin to focus constructions in Gbe. The question word is found at the beginning of the sentence, as is the focus marker. The close relationship to focus is also clear from the fact that in Gbe, a sentence cannot contain a question word and a focused element simultaneously.

Afua de Gɛ à?
Afua reach:PFV Gɛ Q
'Did Afua go to Accra?' (Ewegbe, question)

étɛ́ Sɛ́ná xìá?
what Sena read:PFV
'What did Sena read?' (Gungbe, question word question)

Topicalization, the signalling of the subject that is being talked about, is achieved in Gbe languages by the move of the topicalized element to the beginning of the sentence. In some Gbe languages, a topic marker is suffixed to the topicalized element. In other Gbe languages the topic has to be definite. A topicalized element precedes the focused element in a sentence containing both.

...ɖɔ̀ dàn ɔ́, Kòfí wɛ̀ hùì ~
that snake DET Kofi FOC kill:PFV it
'...that the snake, KOFI killed it' (Fongbe, topic)

Negation is expressed in various ways in the Gbe languages. In general, three methods of negation can be distinguished: Languages like Gungbe express negation by a preverbal marker má; Fongbe-type languages express negation either like Gungbe, or with a sentence-final marker ã; and languages like Ewegbe require both the preverbal marker mé and a sentence-final marker o.

Sentential negation (examples adapted from Aboh 2003 unpublished handout)
Kɔ̀jó má xɔ̀ kátikáti lɔ́	Kojo NEG buy kite DET	Kojo did not buy the kite	(Gungbe)
Kɔ̀kú má ná xɔ̀ àsɔ́n ɔ́	Koku NEG FUT buy crab DET	Koku will not buy the crab	(Fongbe)
Kɔ̀kú ná xɔ̀ àsɔ́n ɔ́ ã	Koku FUT buy crab DET NEG	Koku will not buy the crab	(Fongbe)
Kòfi mé ɖù nú ò	Kofi NEG eat thing NEG	Kofi did not eat	(Ewegbe)

Gbe languages share an areal feature found in many languages of the Volta basin, the serial verb construction. This means that two or more verbs can be juxtaposed in one clause, sharing the same subject, lacking conjunctive markings, resulting in a meaning that expresses the consecutive or simultaneous aspect of the actions of the verbs.

Kofí trɔ dzo kpoo
Kofi turn:PFV leave:PFV quietly
'Kofi turned and left quietly' (Ewegbe, serial verb construction)

== See also ==
- List of Proto-Gbe reconstructions (Wiktionary)
