= Phla language =

Gbe language of Benin and Togo

Phla
- Xwla
- Pronunciation: χʷlà
- Native to: Benin, Togo
- Native speakers: 160,000 (2018)
- Language family: Niger–Congo?: Atlantic–Congo; Volta–Niger; Gbe; Phla–Pherá; Phla

Official status
- Recognised minority language in: Benin

Language codes
- ISO 639-3: Either: gbx – Eastern xwl – Western
- Glottolog: east2390 Eastern west2456 Western

Phla (Kpla), also spelled Xwla, is a Gbe language of Benin and Togo.
