= Gen language =

Gbe language of Togo

Gen
- Mina, Popo, Arda
- gɛn
- Native to: Togo; Benin
- Native speakers: 620,000 (2019–2021)
- Language family: Niger–Congo?: Atlantic–Congo; Volta–Congo languages; Kwa; Gbe; Gen

Official status
- Recognised minority language in: Benin

Language codes
- ISO 639-3: gej
- Glottolog: genn1243
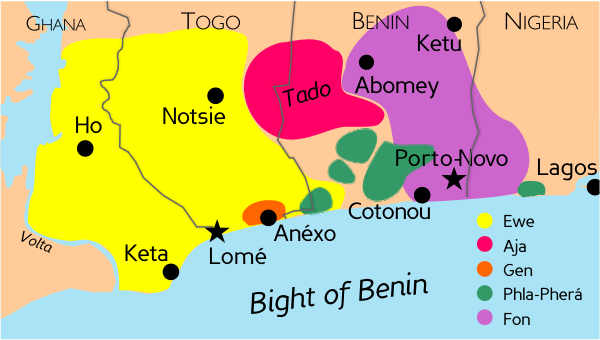
- Map showing the distribution of the major Gbe languages in 1991 (Gen is shown in orange, mainly around Aného).

Gen (also called Gɛ̃, Gɛn gbe, Gebe, Guin, Mina, Mina-Gen, and Popo) is a Gbe language spoken in the southeast of Togo in the Maritime Region. Like the other Gbe languages, Gen is a tonal language.

== History ==
The Gen language is spoken by the Gen-Mina people, who originated from Accra and Elmina in Ghana and then moved to modern-day Togo. The Mina from Elmina migrated because of the Denkyira wars of aggression, while the Gen came over from Accra after their defeat in the Akwamu wars. The two groups intermingled with the indigenous Ewe, resulting in their Ewe dialect having words borrowed from Fanti, Gã and various European languages.

The Gen language is mutually intelligible with Ewe and is considered to be one of the many dialects of Ewe.

There were 476,000 Gen-speakers in Togo in 2019, and 144,000 in Benin in 2021.

== Phonology ==
=== Vowels ===
The vowels of Mina (Gen) are as follows:

a ã e ɛ ẽ i ĩ o ɔ õ u ũ

== Orthography ==
The orthography is defined in the Alphabet des langues nationales of Benin. In the 1990 edition, Gen shared its alphabet with Waci. In the 2008 edition, Gen has its own alphabet (without F with hook ⟨ƒ⟩).

Alphabet
Uppercase	A	B	C	D	Ɖ	E	Ɛ	F	G	GB	Ɣ	H	X	I	J	K	KP	L	M	N	NY	Ŋ	Ɔ	P	S	T	U	Ʋ	V	W	Y	Z
Lowercase	a	b	c	d	ɖ	e	ɛ	f	g	gb	ɣ	h	x	i	j	k	kp	l	m	n	ny	ŋ	ɔ	p	s	t	u	ʋ	v	w	y	z

Nasalisation is indicated with a n after the vowel (⟨an ɔn ɛn in un⟩).

== Misidentification with South American Arda language ==
Mina has in the past misidentified as the 'Arda' language isolate of South America.

== Sources ==
- Kangni, Atah-Ekoué (1989) La syntaxe du Gẽ: étude syntaxique d'un parler Gbe: le Gẽ du Sud-Togo. Frankfurt: Peter Lang.
