= Benin =

Country in West Africa

Republic of Benin République du Bénin (French)
- Flag Coat of arms
- Motto: "Fraternité, Justice, Travail" (French); Fraternity, Justice, Labour
- Anthem: L'Aube nouvelle (French) "The New Dawn"
- Capital: Porto-Novo
- Largest city: Cotonou
- Official languages: French
- National languages: List: Arabic; English; Aguna; Aja; Alada; Fon; Gbe; Gen; Gun; Pherá; Phla; Tofin; Tɔli; Waci; Berba; Kabye; Lama; Lukpa; Mbelime; Mossi; Nateni; Ngangam; Tammari; Tem; Waama; Yom; Kwa; Chakosi; Foodo; Ede; Ifè; Mokole; Yoruba; Yoruboid; Bariba; Dendi; Fula; Hausa
- Ethnic groups (2013): 38.4% Fon; 15.1% Adja and Mina; 12% Yoruba; 9.6% Bariba; 8.6% Fula; 6.1% Ottamari; 4.3% Yoa-Lokpa; 2.9% Dendi; 2.8% other
- Religion (2020): 53% Christianity; 31% Islam; 11% traditional/other; 5% no religion
- Demonyms: Beninese; Beninoise
- Government: Unitary presidential republic
  - President: Romuald Wadagni
  - Vice President: Mariam Chabi Talata
- Legislature: Beninese Parliament
  - Upper house: Senate
  - Lower house: National Assembly

Independence from France
  - Republic of Dahomey established within the French Community: 11 December 1958
  - Independence: 1 August 1960

Area
  - Total: 114,763 km^{2} (44,310 sq mi) (100th)
  - Water (%): 0.4%

Population
  - 2026 estimate: ▲15,170,420 (76th)
  - Density: 94.8/km^{2} (245.5/sq mi) (98th)
- GDP (PPP): 2026 estimate
  - Total: ▲$76.510 billion (137th)
  - Per capita: ▲$4,980 (163rd)
- GDP (nominal): 2026 estimate
  - Total: ▲$27.450 billion (141st)
  - Per capita: ▲$1,790 (163rd)
- Gini (2021): ▼34.4 medium inequality
- HDI (2023): ▲0.515 low (173rd)
- Currency: West African CFA franc (XOF)
- Time zone: UTC+1 (WAT)
- Date format: dd/mm/yyyy
- Calling code: +229
- ISO 3166 code: BJ
- Internet TLD: .bj
- 1. Cotonou is the seat of government.

Benin, (Note: /bɛˈniːn/ ben-EEN, /bɪˈniːn/ bin-EEN; French: Bénin [benɛ̃]) officially the Republic of Benin, (Note: French: République du Bénin) formerly known as Dahomey, is a country in West Africa. It is bordered by Togo to the west, Nigeria to the east, Burkina Faso to the northwest, and Niger to the northeast. The majority of its population lives on the southern coastline of the Bight of Benin, part of the Gulf of Guinea in the northernmost tropical portion of the Atlantic Ocean. The capital is Porto-Novo, and the seat of government is in Cotonou, the most populous city and economic capital. Benin covers an area of 112,622 km^{2} (43,484 sq mi), and its population in 2026 was estimated to be approximately 15 million. It is a tropical country with an economy heavily dependent on agriculture and the exports of palm oil and cotton.

From the 17th to the 19th centuries, political entities in the area included the Kingdom of Dahomey, the city-state of Porto Novo, and other states to the north. France took over the territory in 1894, incorporating it into French West Africa as French Dahomey. In 1960, Dahomey gained full independence from France. As a sovereign state, Benin has had democratic governments, military coups, and military governments. A self-described Marxist–Leninist state called the People's Republic of Benin existed between 1975 and 1990. In 1991, it was replaced by the multi-party Republic of Benin.

The official language of Benin is French, with indigenous languages such as Fon, Bariba, Yoruba and Dendi also spoken. The largest religious group in Benin, as projected for 2020 by the Pew Research Centre in 2026 based on 2010 statistics, is Christianity (53%), followed by Islam (31%) and other faiths including African traditional religions (11%). Benin is a member of the United Nations, the African Union, the Economic Community of West African States, the Organisation of Islamic Cooperation, the South Atlantic Peace and Cooperation Zone, Francophonie, the Community of Sahel–Saharan States, the African Petroleum Producers Association and the Niger Basin Authority.

== Etymology ==
During French colonial rule and after independence on 1 August 1960, the country was named Dahomey, after the Kingdom of Dahomey. On 30 November 1975, following a Marxist–Leninist military coup (the 1972 Dahomeyan coup d'état), the country was renamed Benin, after the Bight of Benin, which borders the country, since the name Dahomey is exclusively associated with the Fon who inhabited the southern half of the country. The bight takes its name from the Kingdom of Benin, located in present-day Nigeria.

== History ==
=== Pre-colonial ===
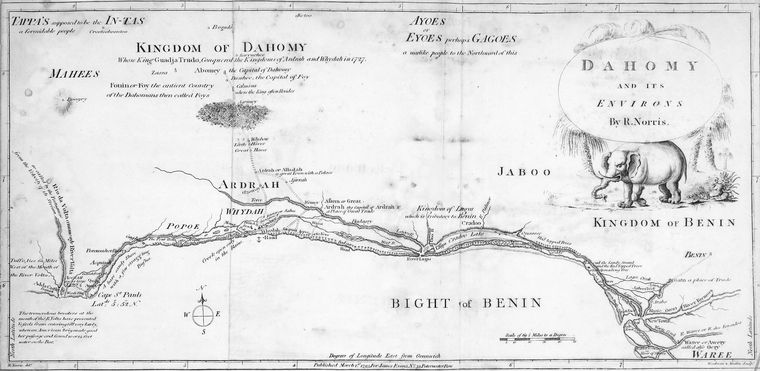
Map of the Kingdom of Dahomey, 1793

Prior to 1600, present-day Benin comprised a variety of areas with different political systems and ethnicities. These included city-states along the coast (primarily of the Aja ethnic group and also including Yoruba and Gbe peoples) and tribal regions inland (composed of Bariba, Mahi, Gedevi, and Kabye peoples). The Oyo Empire, located primarily to the east of Benin, was a military force in the region, conducting raids and exacting tribute from the coastal kingdoms and tribal regions. The situation changed in the 17th and 18th centuries as the Kingdom of Dahomey, consisting mostly of Fon people, was founded on the Abomey plateau and began taking over areas along the coast. By 1727, King Agaja of the Kingdom of Dahomey had conquered the coastal cities of Allada and Whydah. Dahomey had become a tributary of the Oyo Empire, and rivaled but did not directly attack the Oyo-allied city-state of Porto-Novo. The rise of Dahomey, its rivalry with Porto-Novo, and tribal politics in the northern region persisted into the colonial and post-colonial periods.

In the Dahomey, some younger people were apprenticed to older soldiers and taught the kingdom's military customs until they were old enough to join the army. Dahomey instituted an elite female soldier corps variously called Ahosi (the king's wives), Mino ("our mothers" in Fongbe) or the "Dahomean Amazons". This emphasis on military preparation and achievement earned Dahomey the nickname of "Black Sparta", from European observers and 19th-century explorers such as Sir Richard Burton.

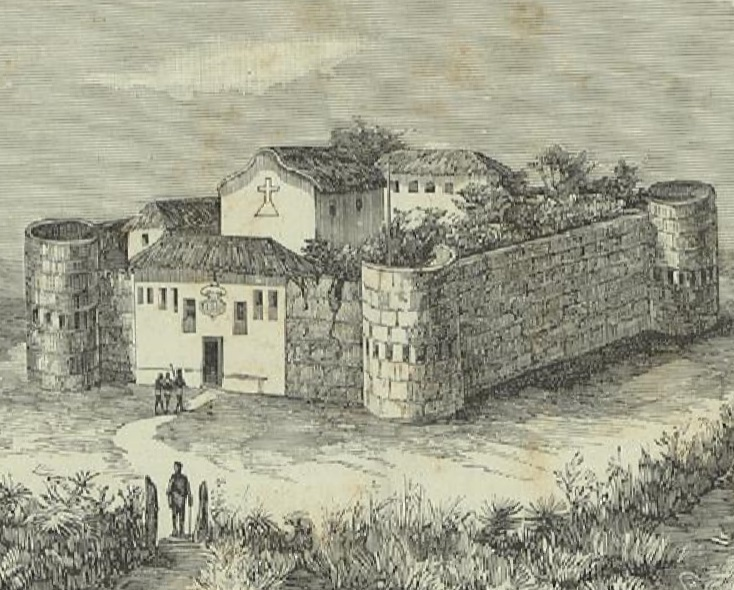
The Portuguese Empire was the longest European presence in Benin, beginning in 1680 and ending in 1961 when the last forces left Ajudá.

The kings of Dahomey sold their war captives into transatlantic slavery or killed them ritually in a ceremony known as the Annual Customs. By about 1750, the King of Dahomey was earning an estimated £250,000 per year by selling African captives to European slave-traders. The area was named the "Slave Coast" because of a flourishing slave trade. Court protocols which demanded that a portion of war captives from the kingdom's battles be decapitated, decreased the number of enslaved people exported from the area. The number went from 102,000 people per decade in the 1780s to 24,000 per decade by the 1860s. The decline was partly due to the Slave Trade Act 1807 banning the trans-Atlantic slave trade by Britain in 1808, followed by other countries. This decline continued until 1885 when the last slave ship departed the modern Benin Republic for Brazil, which had yet to abolish slavery. The capital Porto-Novo ("New Port" in Portuguese) was originally developed as a port for the slave trade.

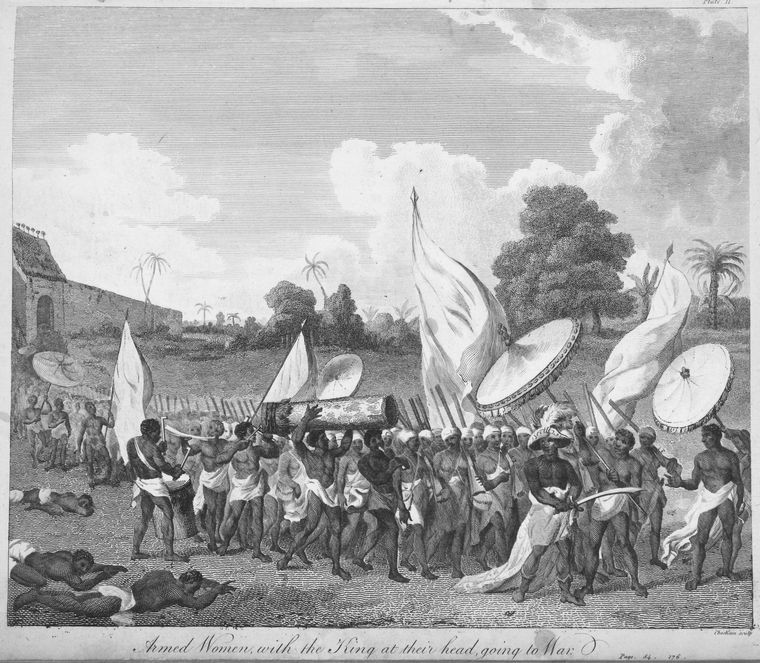
Dahomey Amazons with the King at their head, going to war, 1793

Among the goods the Portuguese sought were carved items of ivory made by Benin's artisans in the form of carved saltcellars, spoons, and hunting horns – pieces of African art produced for sale abroad as exotic objects. Another major good sought by European settlers was palm oil. In 1856, approximately 2,500 tons of palm oil was exported by British companies which was valued at £112,500.

=== Colonial ===
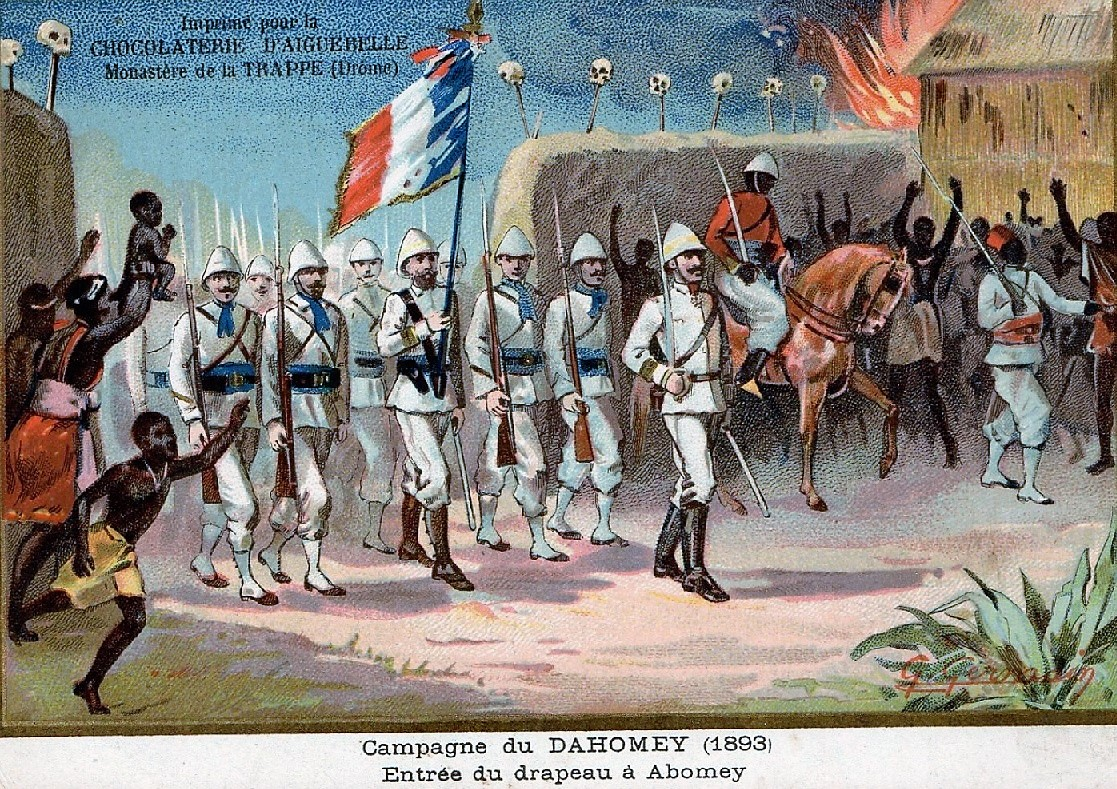
A French depiction of the conquest of Dahomey in 1893

By the middle of the 19th century, Dahomey had "begun to weaken and lose its status as the regional power". The French took over the area in 1892. In 1899, the French included the land called French Dahomey within the larger French West Africa colonial region.

France sought to benefit from Dahomey and the region "appeared to lack the necessary agricultural or mineral resources for large-scale capitalist development". As a result, France treated Dahomey as a sort of preserve in case future discoveries revealed resources worth developing.

The French government outlawed the capture and sale of slaves. Previous slaveowners sought to redefine their control over slaves as control over land, tenants, and lineage members. This provoked a struggle among Dahomeans, "concentrated in the period from 1895 to 1920, for the redistribution of control over land and labor. Villages sought to redefine boundaries of lands and fishing preserves. Religious disputes scarcely veiled the factional struggles over control of land and commerce which underlay them. Factions struggled for the leadership of great families".

In 1958, France granted autonomy to the Republic of Dahomey, and full independence on 1 August 1960 which is celebrated each year as Independence Day, a national holiday. The president who led the country to independence was Hubert Maga.

=== Post-colonial ===
After 1960, there were coups and regime changes, with the figures of Hubert Maga, Sourou Migan Apithy, Justin Ahomadégbé, and Émile Derlin Zinsou dominating; the first three each represented a different area and ethnicity of the country. These three agreed to form a Presidential Council after violence marred the 1970 elections.

On 7 May 1972, Maga ceded power to Ahomadégbé. On 26 October 1972, Lt. Col. Mathieu Kérékou overthrew the ruling triumvirate, becoming president and stating that the country would not "burden itself by copying foreign ideology, and wants neither Capitalism, Communism, nor Socialism". On 30 November 1974, he announced that the country was officially Marxist, under control of the Military Council of the Revolution (CMR), which nationalized the petroleum industry and banks. On 30 November 1975, he renamed the country the People's Republic of Benin. The regime of the People's Republic of Benin underwent changes over the course of its existence: a nationalist period (1972–1974); a socialist phase (1974–1982); and a phase involving an opening to Western countries and economic liberalism (1982–1990).

In 1974, the government embarked on a program to nationalize strategic sectors of the economy, reform the education system, establish agricultural cooperatives and new local government structures, and a campaign to eradicate "feudal forces" including tribalism. The regime banned opposition activities. Mathieu Kérékou was elected president by the National Revolutionary Assembly in 1980, re-elected in 1984. Establishing relations with China, North Korea, and Libya, he put "nearly all" businesses and economic activities under state control, causing foreign investment in Benin to dry up. Kérékou attempted to reorganize education, pushing his own aphorisms such as "Poverty is not a fatality". The regime financed its operations by contracting to accept nuclear waste, initially from the Soviet Union and subsequently from France.

In the 1980s, Benin experienced higher economic growth rates (15.6% in 1982, 4.6% in 1983 and 8.2% in 1984), until the closure of the Nigerian border with Benin led to a drop in customs and tax revenues. The government was no longer able to pay civil servants' salaries. In 1989, riots broke out when the regime did not have enough money to pay its army. The banking system collapsed. Eventually, Kérékou renounced Marxism, and a convention forced Kérékou to release political prisoners and arrange elections. Marxism–Leninism was abolished as the country's form of government.

The country's name was officially changed to the Republic of Benin on 1 March 1990, after the newly formed government's constitution was completed. Kérékou lost to Nicéphore Soglo in a 1991 election and became the first president on the African mainland to lose power through an election. Kérékou returned to power after winning the 1996 vote. In 2001, an election resulted in Kérékou winning another term, after which his opponents claimed election irregularities. In 1999, Kérékou issued a national apology for the substantial role that Africans had played in the Atlantic slave trade.

=== 21st century ===
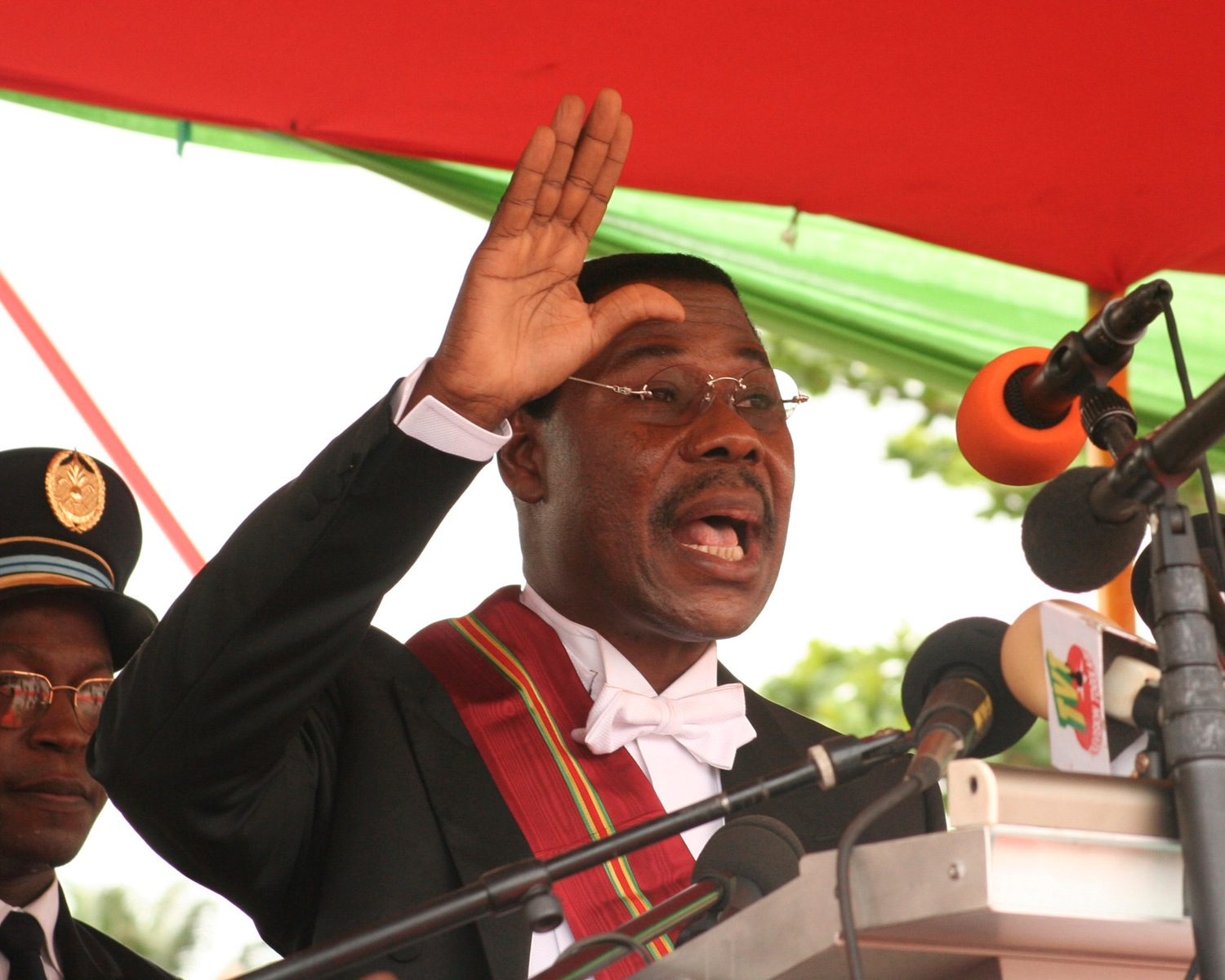
Thomas Boni Yayi's 2006 presidential inauguration

Kérékou and former president Soglo did not run in the 2006 elections, as both were barred by the constitution's restrictions on age and total terms of candidates. The Beninese presidential election, 2006 resulted in a runoff between Thomas Boni Yayi and Adrien Houngbédji. The runoff election was held on 19 March and was won by Boni, who assumed office on 6 April. Boni was reelected in 2011, taking 53.18% of the vote in the first round—enough to avoid a runoff election. He was the first president to win an election without a runoff since the restoration of democracy in 1991.

In the March 2016 presidential elections in which Boni Yayi was barred by the constitution from running for a third term, businessman Patrice Talon won the second round with 65.37% of the vote, defeating investment banker and former Prime Minister Lionel Zinsou. Talon was sworn in on 6 April 2016. Speaking on the same day that the Constitutional Court confirmed the results, Talon said that he would "first and foremost tackle constitutional reform", discussing his plan to limit presidents to a single term of 5 years to combat "complacency". He said that he planned to slash the size of the government from 28 to 16 members. In April 2021, President Patrice Talon was re-elected, with more than 86.3% of the votes cast in the 2021 Beninese presidential election. The change in election laws resulted in total control of parliament by president Talon's supporters.

In February 2022, Benin saw its largest terrorist attack in history, the W National Park massacre. On 20 February 2022, President Talon inaugurated an exhibition with 26 pieces of sacred art returned to Benin by France, 129 years after they were looted by colonial forces.

In March 2025, the government of Benin adopted a law, recognizing 16 kingdoms, 80 senior chiefs and 10 traditional chiefs through a new law. The pre-colonial period starting in 1894 for the south and 1897 for the north served as a historical reference for the bill, identifying traditional territories and rules to institutionalize chieftaincy.

In July 2025, the My Afro Origins law went into effect, granting the right of provisional Beninese citizenship to members of the African diaspora whose ancestry was impacted by the transatlantic slave trade.

On 7 December 2025, a coup attempt occurred in which a faction of the army led by Pascal Tigri claimed to have overthrown President Talon and suspended the government and all political parties. However, the government later announced it had suppressed the coup and regained full control of all institutions.

The Senate was established under a constitutional reform adopted on 18 November 2025 passed by a 90-19 vote in the National Assembly. The government of then president Patrice Talon said the reform was aimed at strengthening political stability, national unity and the functioning of state institutions, leading to Benin’s transition to a bicameral parliament. The senate was sworn in on 30 July 2026. Talon was elected as the president of Senate in its first inaugural session on 6 august 2026, securing 24 out of 25 votes, and marking a return to the centre of national politics only months after leaving the presidency.

== Geography ==
Map of Köppen climate classification

The north–south strip of land in West Africa lies between latitudes 6° and 13°N, and longitudes 0° and 4°E. It is bounded by Togo to the west, Burkina Faso and Niger to the north, Nigeria to the east, and the Bight of Benin to the south. The distance from the Niger River in the north to the Atlantic Ocean in the south is about 650 km (404 mi). Although the coastline measures 121 km (75 mi), the country measures about 325 km (202 mi) at its widest point. Four terrestrial ecoregions lie within Benin's borders: Eastern Guinean forests, Nigerian lowland forests, Guinean forest-savanna mosaic, and West Sudanian savanna. It had a 2018 Forest Landscape Integrity Index mean score of 5.86/10, ranking it 93rd globally out of 172 countries.

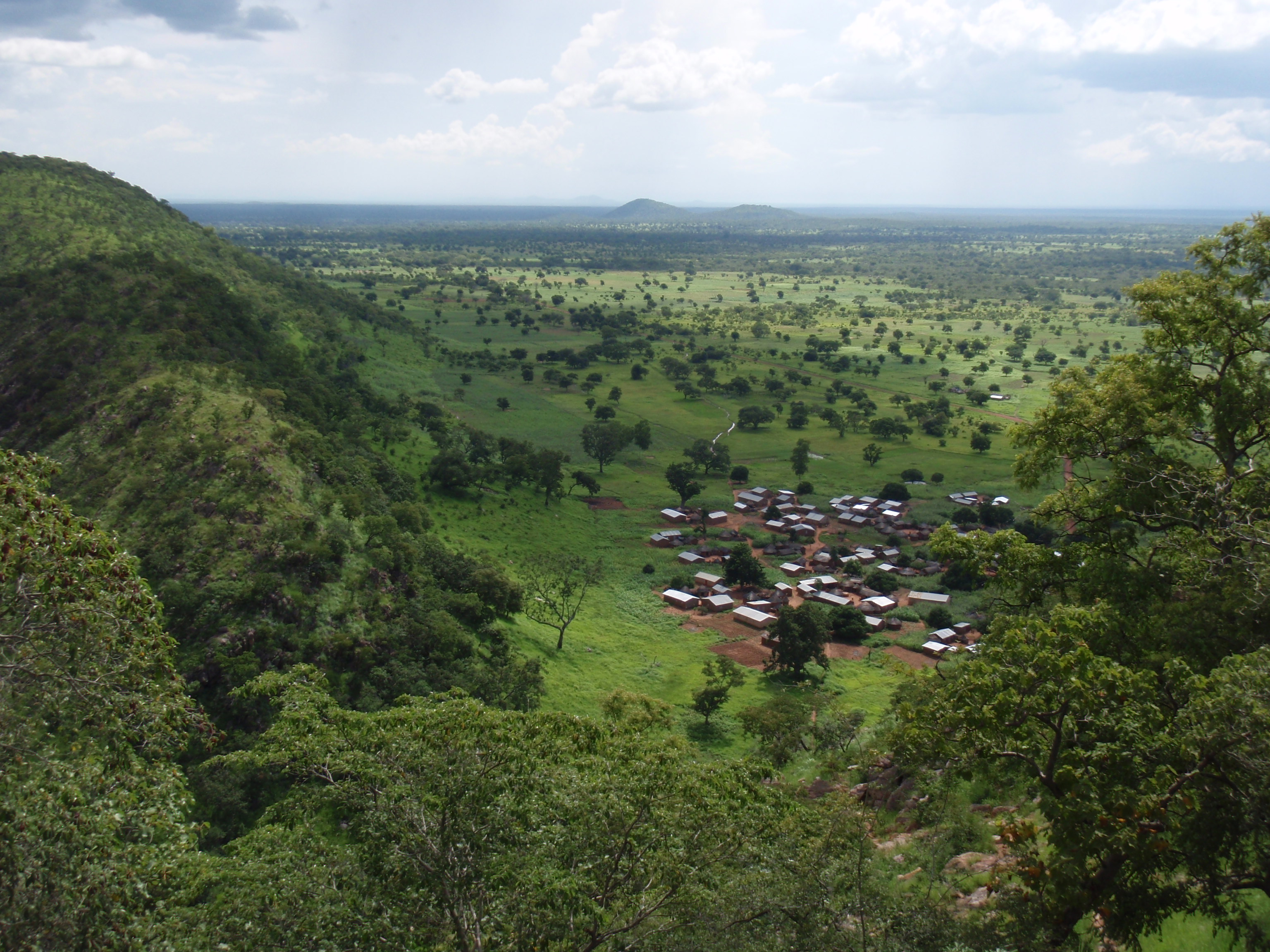
Atakora, one of Benin's two northernmost departments

Benin shows some variation in elevation and can be divided into four areas from the south to the north, starting with the lower-lying, sandy, coastal plain (highest elevation 10 m or 32.8 ft) which is, at most, 10 km (6.2 mi) wide. It is marshy and dotted with lakes and lagoons communicating with the ocean. Behind the coast lies the Guinean forest-savanna mosaic-covered plateaus of southern Benin (altitude between 20 and 200 m or 66 and 656 ft), which are split by valleys running north to south along the Couffo, Zou, and Ouémé Rivers.

This geography makes it vulnerable to climate change. With the majority of the country living near the coast in lower-lying areas, sea level rise could affect the economy and population. Northern areas will see additional regions become deserts. An area of flatter land dotted with rocky hills whose altitude reaches 400 m (1,312 ft) extends around Nikki and Save.

A range of mountains extends along the northwest border and into Togo; these are the Atacora. The highest point, Mont Sokbaro, is at 658 m (2,159 ft). Benin has fields, mangroves and remnants of forests. In the rest of the country, the savanna is covered with thorny scrub and dotted with baobab trees. Some forests line the banks of rivers. In the north and the northwest of Benin, the Reserve du W du Niger and Pendjari National Park have African bush elephants, lions, antelopes, hippopotamus and monkeys. Pendjari National Park together with the bordering Parks Arli and W National Park in Burkina Faso and Niger are among the strongholds of the lion in West Africa; with an estimated 246–466 lions, W-Arli-Pendjari harbors the largest remaining lion population in West Africa. Historically Benin has served as habitat for the endangered African wild dog, Lycaon pictus; this canid is thought to have been locally extinct.

Annual rainfall in the coastal area averages 1300 mm or about 51 inches. Benin has two rainy and two dry seasons per year. The principal rainy season is from April to late July, with a shorter, less intense rainy period from September to November. The main dry season is from December to April, with a cooler dry season from July to September. Temperatures and humidity are higher along the tropical coast. In Cotonou, the average maximum temperature is 31 °C (87.8 °F); the minimum is 24 °C (75.2 °F).

Variations in temperature increase when moving north through savanna and plateau toward the Sahel. A dry wind from the Sahara called the harmattan blows from December to March, when the grass dries up, other vegetation turns reddish-brown, and a veil of fine dust hangs over the country, causing the skies to be overcast. It is also the season when farmers burn brush in the fields.

In Benin forest cover is around 28% of the total land area, equivalent to 3,135,150 ha (12,104.9 sq mi) of forest in 2020, down from 4,835,150 ha (18,668.6 sq mi) in 1990. In 2020, naturally regenerating forests covered 3,112,150 ha (12,016.1 sq mi), and planted forests covered 23,000 ha (89 sq mi).

== Government and politics ==
Benin's politics take place in a framework of a presidential representative democratic republic in which the President of Benin is both head of state and head of government, within a multi-party system. Executive power is exercised by the government. Legislative power is vested in the government and the legislature being a bicameral parliament. The judiciary is officially independent of the executive and the legislature, while in practice its independence has been gradually hollowed out by former president Talon. The political system is derived from the 1990 Constitution of Benin and the subsequent transition to democracy in 1991 with its latest amendment in 2025.

It was ranked 18th out of 52 African countries and scored best in the categories of Safety & Rule of Law and Participation & Human Rights. In its 2007 Worldwide Press Freedom Index, Reporters Without Borders ranked Benin 53rd out of 169 countries. That place had fallen to 78th by 2016, when Talon took office, and has fallen further to 113th. Benin has been rated equal-88th out of 159 countries in a 2005 analysis of police, business, and political corruption.

On 7 December 2025, a group of soldiers in Benin appeared on state television claiming they had overthrown Patrice Talon, dissolved the government, and installed a new ruling body they called the Military Committee for Refoundation. However, the government and loyalist forces quickly pushed back. The interior minister said the coup attempt had been foiled by forces loyal to the constitutional government, and public life was urged to continue normally. The regional body ECOWAS, at the request of President Talon, called for the immediate deployment of ECOWAS standby troops to suppress any further uprisings and fully reestablish control over Cotonou with Nigeria deploying fighter jets over Cotonou and also sending its land forces into Benin.

Presidential elections were held in Benin on 12 April 2026, following the 11 January parliamentary elections conducted in accordance with the national electoral code. President Patrice Talon, serving his second and final constitutional term, had maintained that he would not seek a constitutional amendment to pursue re-election. The contest, which international observers characterized as neither free nor fair, resulted in a landslide victory for Finance Minister Romuald Wadagni, who officially secured more than 94% of the vote. No credible opposition candidate was allowed to be on the ballot, and the primary opposition party, the Democrats, failed to field a candidate.

=== Administrative divisions ===
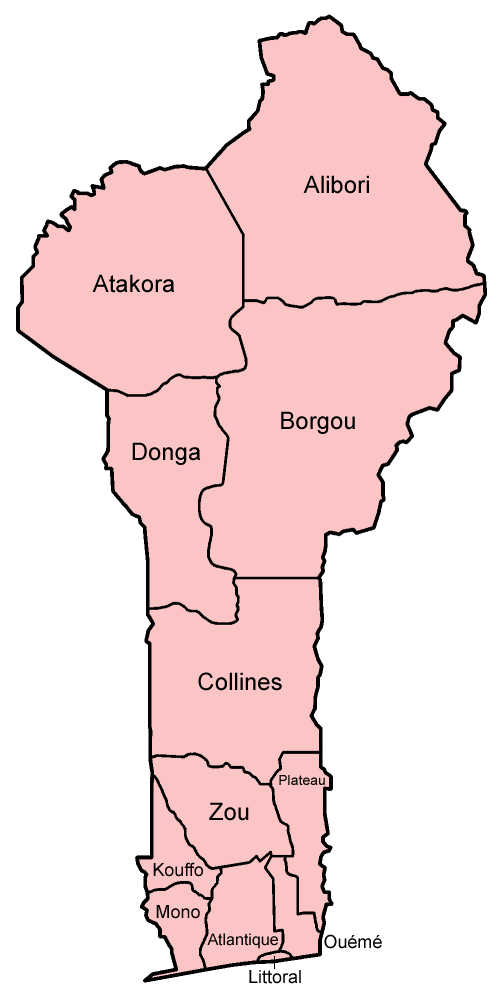
Departments of Benin

Benin is divided into twelve departments (French: départements) which are subdivided into 77 communes. In 1999, the previous six departments were each split into two-halves, forming the later twelve.

Map key	Department	Capital	Population (2013)	Area (km^{2})	Population density (per km^{2} in 2013)	Former Department	Region	Sub-Region
2	Alibori	Kandi	868,046	26,242	33.1	Borgou	North	North East
1	Atakora	Natitingou	769,337	20,499	37.5	Atakora	North	North West
10	Atlantique	Allada	1,396,548	3,233	432	Atlantique	South	South Centre
4	Borgou	Parakou	1,202,095	25,856	46.5	Borgou	North	North East
5	Collines	Dassa-Zoumé	716,558	13,931	51.4	Zou	South	South Centre
6	Kouffo	Aplahoué	741,895	2,404	308.6	Mono	South	South West
3	Donga	Djougou	542,605	11,126	48.8	Atakora	North	North West
11	Littoral	Cotonou	678,874	79	8,593.3	Atlantique	South	South Centre
9	Mono	Lokossa	495,307	1,605	308.6	Mono	South	South West
12	Ouémé	Porto-Novo	1,096,850	1,281	856.2	Ouémé	South	South East
8	Plateau	Pobè	624,146	3,264	191.2	Ouémé	South	South East
7	Zou	Abomey	851,623	5,243	162.4	Zou	South	South Centre

== Demographics ==
Ethnic Groups of Benin (2013 Census)
1. Goun & Fon (38.4%)
2. Adja & Mina (15.1%)
3. Yoruba (12.0%)
4. Bariba (9.60%)
5. Fula (8.60%)
6. Ottamari (6.10%)
7. Yoa-Lokpa (4.30%)
8. Dendi (2.90%)
9. Other (2.80%)

The majority of Benin's 11,485,000 inhabitants live in the south of the country. The life expectancy is 62 years. About 42 African ethnic groups live in this country, including the Yoruba in the southeast (migrated from Nigeria in the 12th century); the Dendi in the north-central area (who came from Mali in the 16th century); the Bariba and the Fula in the northeast; the Betammaribe and the Somba in the Atakora Mountains; the Fon in the area around Abomey in the South Central and the Mina, Xueda, and Aja (who came from Togo) on the coast.

The personnel of European embassies and foreign aid missions and of nongovernmental organisations and missionary groups account for a part of the 5,500 European population.

Non-Africans include Europeans, Lebanese people and South Asians.

Historical population
Year	1950	2000	2021
Population	2,200,000	6,800,000	13,000,000
±%	—	+209.1%	+91.2%

Largest cities or towns in Benin According to the 2013 Census
Rank	Name	Department	Pop.
1	Cotonou	Littoral	679,012
2	Porto-Novo	Ouémé	264,320
3	Parakou	Borgou	255,478
4	Godomey	Atlantique	253,262
5	Abomey-Calavi	Atlantique	117,824
6	Djougou	Donga	94,773
7	Bohicon	Zou	93,744
8	Ekpè	Ouémé	75,313
9	Abomey	Zou	67,885
10	Nikki	Borgou	66,109

=== Language ===
Local languages are used as the many languages of instruction in elementary schools, with French introduced in later years. At the secondary school level, French is the sole language of instruction. Beninese languages are "generally transcribed" with a separate letter for each speech sound (phoneme), rather than using diacritics as in French or digraphs as in English. This includes Beninese Yoruba, which in Nigeria is written with both diacritics and digraphs. For instance, the mid vowels written é, è, ô, o in French are written e, ɛ, o, ɔ in Beninese languages, whereas the consonants that are written ng and sh or ch in English are written ŋ and c. Digraphs are used for nasal vowels and the labial-velar consonants kp and gb, as in the name of the Fon language Fon gbe /fõ ɡ͡be/, and diacritics are used as tone marks. In French-language publications, a mixture of French and Beninese orthographies may be seen.

=== Religion ===
Religion in Benin (2013 census)
1. Christianity (48.5%)
2. Islam (27.7%)
3. Vodun (11.6%)
4. Others / None (12.2%)

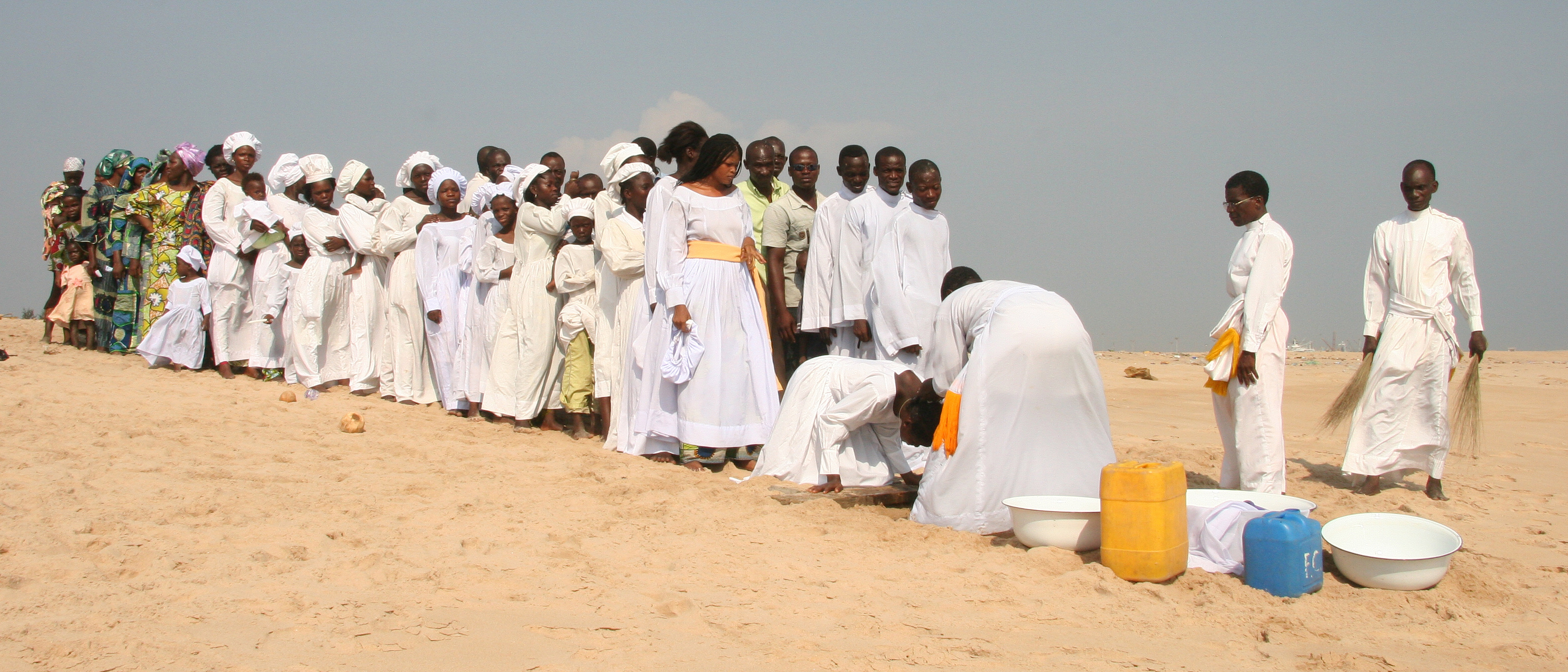
A Celestial Church of Christ baptism in Cotonou. 5% of Benin's population belongs to this denomination, an African Initiated Church.

The two main religions in Benin are Christianity, followed mostly in the south and center, and Islam, brought by the Songhai Empire and Hausa merchants and followed in Alibori, Borgou, and Donga provinces, as well as among the Yoruba, who also practice Christianity. Some continue to hold Vodun and Orisha beliefs and have incorporated the pantheon of Vodun and Orisha into Christianity. Ahmadiyya, a sect of Islam originating in the 19th century, also has a presence in the country.

In the 2013 census, 48.5% of the population of Benin were Christian (25.5% Roman Catholic, 6.7% Celestial Church of Christ, 3.4% Methodist, and 12.9% other Christian denominations), 27.7% were Muslim, 11.6% practiced Vodun, 2.6% practiced other local traditional religions, 2.6% practiced other religions, and 5.8% claimed no religious affiliation. A government survey conducted by the Demographic and Health Surveys Program in 2011–2012 indicated that followers of Christianity comprised 57.5% of the population (with Catholics making up 33.9%, Methodists 3.0%, Celestials 6.2% and other Christians 14.5%), while Muslims were 22.8%.

A 2026 publication by the Pew Research Centre estimated the population of Benin was 53% Christian, 31% Muslim, 11% adherent of other religions (including traditional faiths), and 5% had no religion in 2020. The publication ranked Benin as the eighth most religiously diverse country in the world. This research estimated that Muslims had the highest proportional growth in Benin, rising from 23.5% to 31.4% of the population between 2010–2020.

Traditional religions include local animistic religions in the Atakora region and Vodun and Orisha veneration among the Yoruba and Tado peoples in the center and south of the nation. The town of Ouidah on the central coast is the spiritual center of Beninese Vodun or Voodoo.

=== Education ===
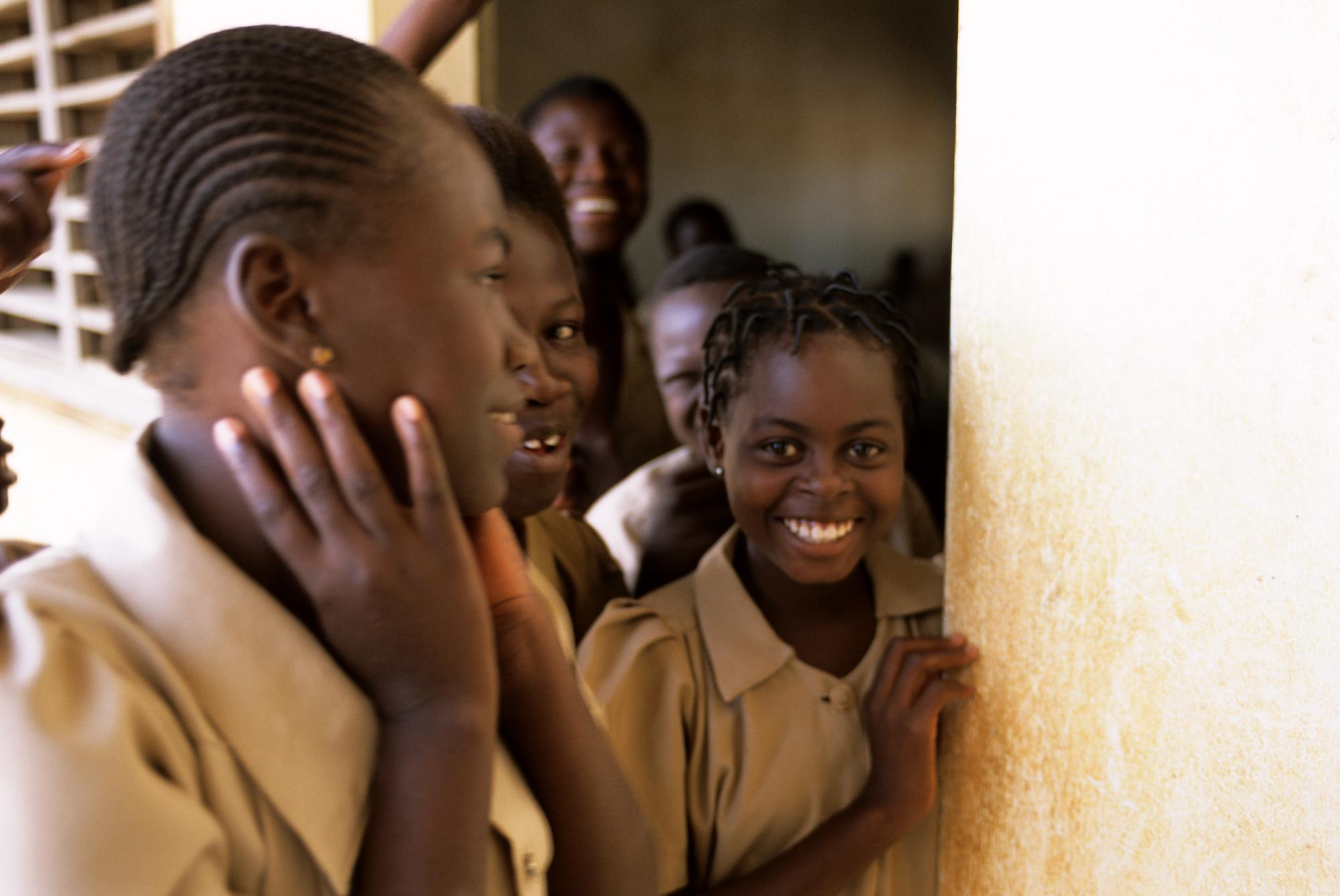
Students

The adult literacy rate in 2022 was estimated to be 51%, up from a historic low of 16% in 1979. Although the literacy rate for males remains higher than that of females, both groups have experienced an increase in literacy over the decades. Between 1979–2022, the adult literacy rate for males rose from 25% to 63%, while that of females grew from 10% to 42% of the population. Benin has achieved universal primary education, and half of the children (54%) were enrolled in secondary education in 2013, according to the UNESCO Institute for Statistics.

While at a time the education system was not free, Benin has abolished school fees and is carrying out the recommendations of its 2007 Educational Forum. The government has devoted more than 4% of GDP to education since 2009. In 2015, public expenditure on education (all levels) amounted to 4.4% of GDP, according to the UNESCO Institute for Statistics. Within this expenditure, Benin devoted a share to tertiary education: 0.97% of GDP.

Between 2009 and 2011, the share of people enrolled at university rose from 10% to 12% of the 18–25-year age cohort. Student enrollment in tertiary education more than doubled between 2006 and 2011 from 50,225 to 110,181. These statistics encompass not only bachelor's, master's, and PhD programmes but also students enrolled in nondegree post-secondary diplomas.

=== Health ===
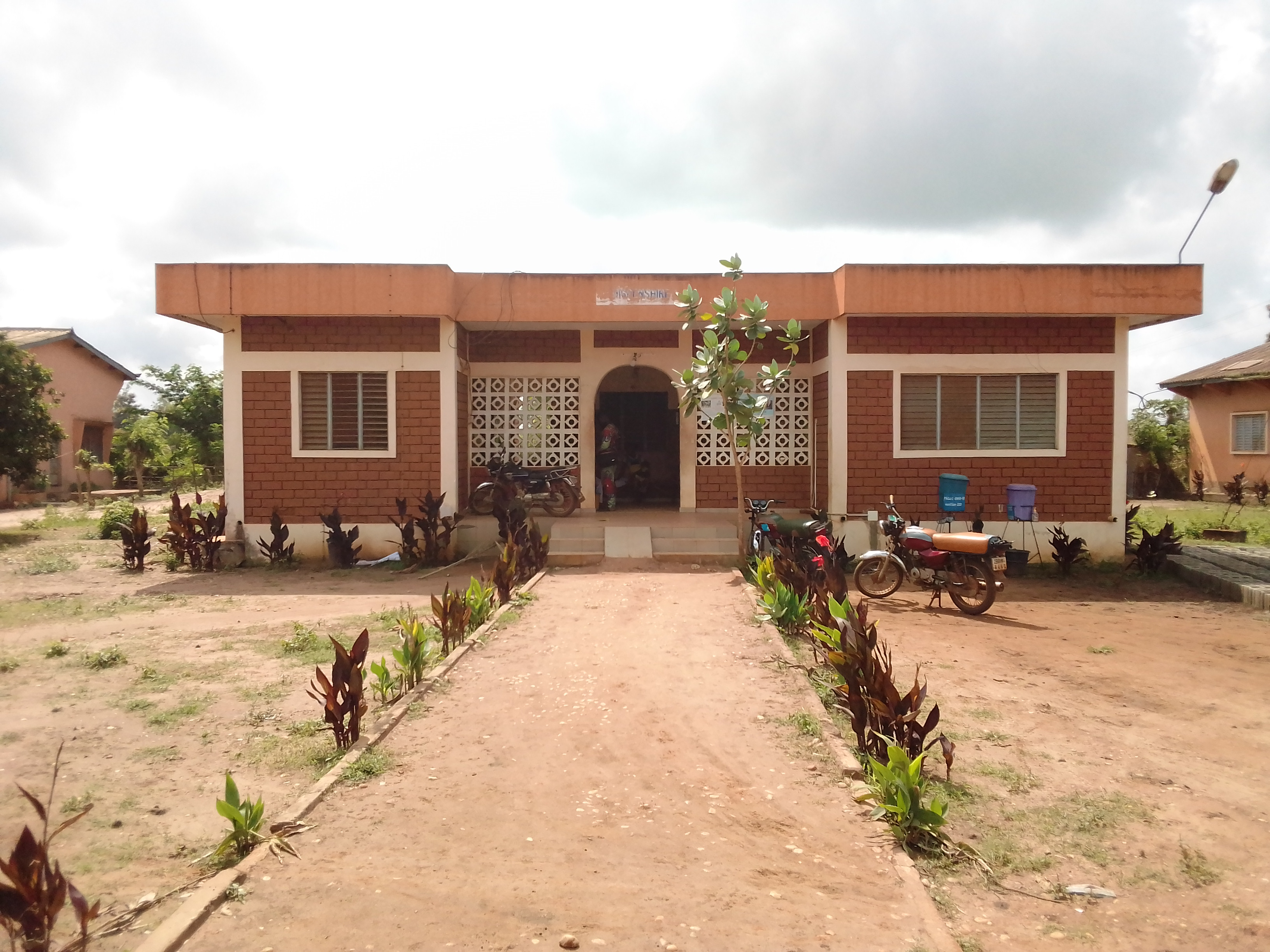
The Adokandji Hospital in Lalo, Couffo.

In 2024, the incidence of HIV/AIDS was estimated at 0.1% of the Beninese population aged 15–49, down from the historic peak of 2.6% in 1995. Malaria is a public health problem in Benin, being a leading cause of morbidity and mortality among children younger than 5 years. By 2024, Benin recorded 5 million cases of the disease. Malaria is present in all departments of Benin, with high-risk areas covering the majority of southern departments. Climate change is predicted to expand the distribution of A. gambiae, the main vector of malaria in Benin, exacerbating the disease risk across the country.

During the 1980s, less than 30% of the country's population had access to primary healthcare services. Benin's infant mortality rate stood at 203 deaths for every 1000 live births. One in three mothers had access to child health care services. The Bamako Initiative changed that by introducing community-based healthcare reform, resulting in a "more efficient and equitable" provision of services. As of 2015, Benin had the 26th highest rate of maternal mortality in the world. According to a 2013 UNICEF report, 13% of women had undergone female genital mutilation. An approach strategy was extended to all areas of healthcare, with subsequent improvement in the health care indicators and improvement in health care efficiency and cost. Demographic and Health Surveys has surveyed the issue in Benin since 1996. In the 2024 Global Hunger Index, Benin ranks 99th out of 127 countries.

== Economy ==
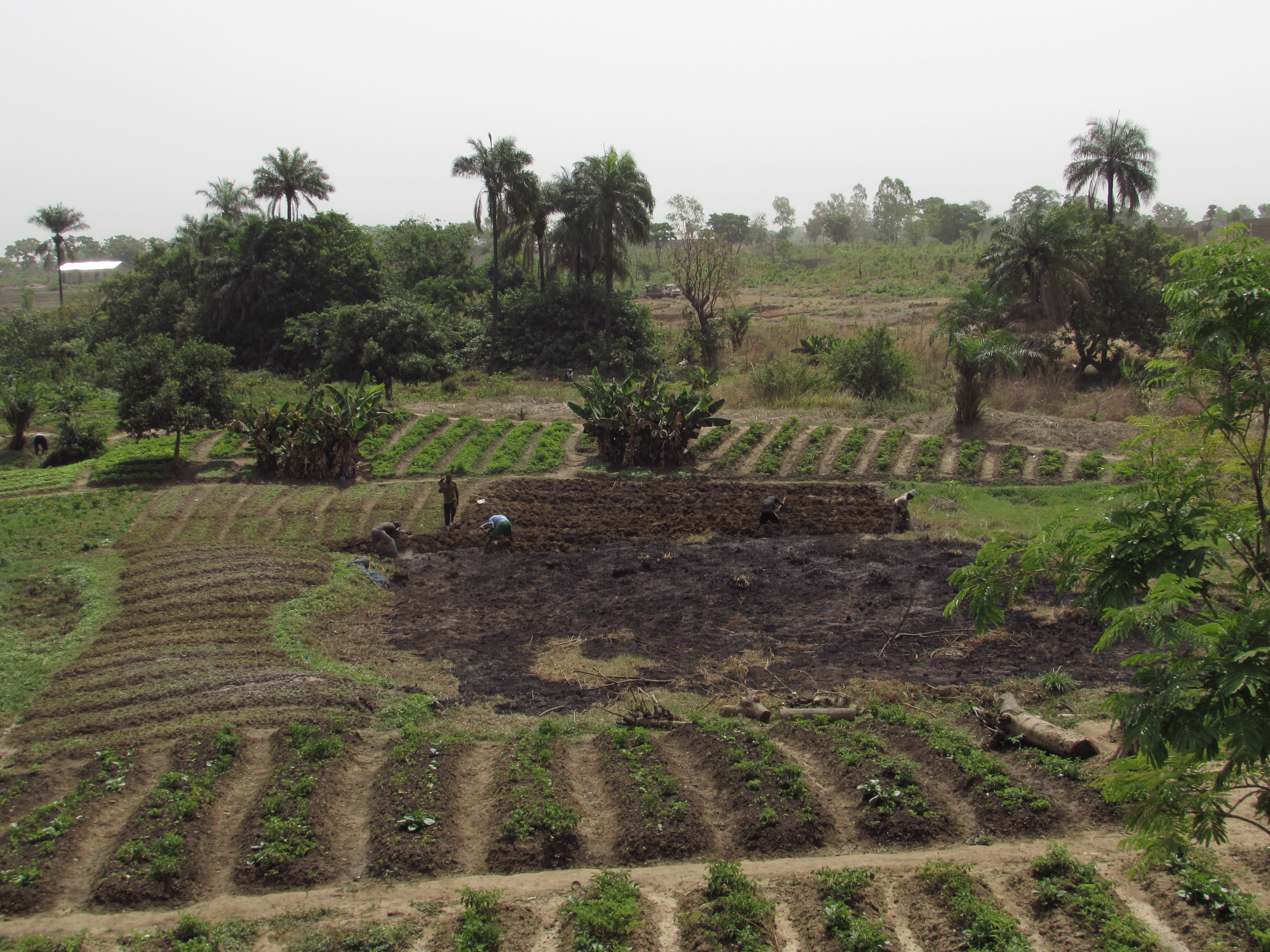
Extensive agriculture in the north of Benin, near Djougou

Real GDP per capita development of Benin since 1950

The economy is dependent on subsistence agriculture, cotton production, and regional trade. Cotton accounts for 40% of the GDP and roughly 80% of official export receipts.

Real GDP growth was estimated at 5.1% and 5.7% in 2008 and 2009, respectively. The main driver of growth is the agricultural sector, with cotton being the main export, while services continue to contribute the largest part of GDP mostly because of Benin's geographical location, enabling trade, transportation, transit and tourism activities with its neighboring states. Benin's overall macroeconomic conditions were "positive" in 2017, with a growth rate of around 5.6%. Economic growth was mostly driven by the cotton industry and other cash crops, the Port of Cotonou, and telecommunications. A source of revenue is the Port of Cotonou, and the government is seeking to expand its revenue base. In 2017, Benin imported about $2.8 billion in goods such as rice, meat and poultry, alcoholic beverages, fuel plastic materials, specialized mining and excavating machinery, telecommunications equipment, passenger vehicles, and toiletries and cosmetics. Principal exports are ginned cotton, cotton cake and cotton seeds, cashew, shea butter, cooking oil, and lumber.

Access to biocapacity is lower than world average. In 2016, Benin had 0.9 global hectares of biocapacity per person within its territory, less than the world average of 1.6 global hectares per person. In 2016 Benin used 1.4 global hectares of biocapacity per person - their ecological footprint of consumption. This means they use "slightly under double" as much biocapacity as Benin contains. As a result, Benin is running a biocapacity deficit.

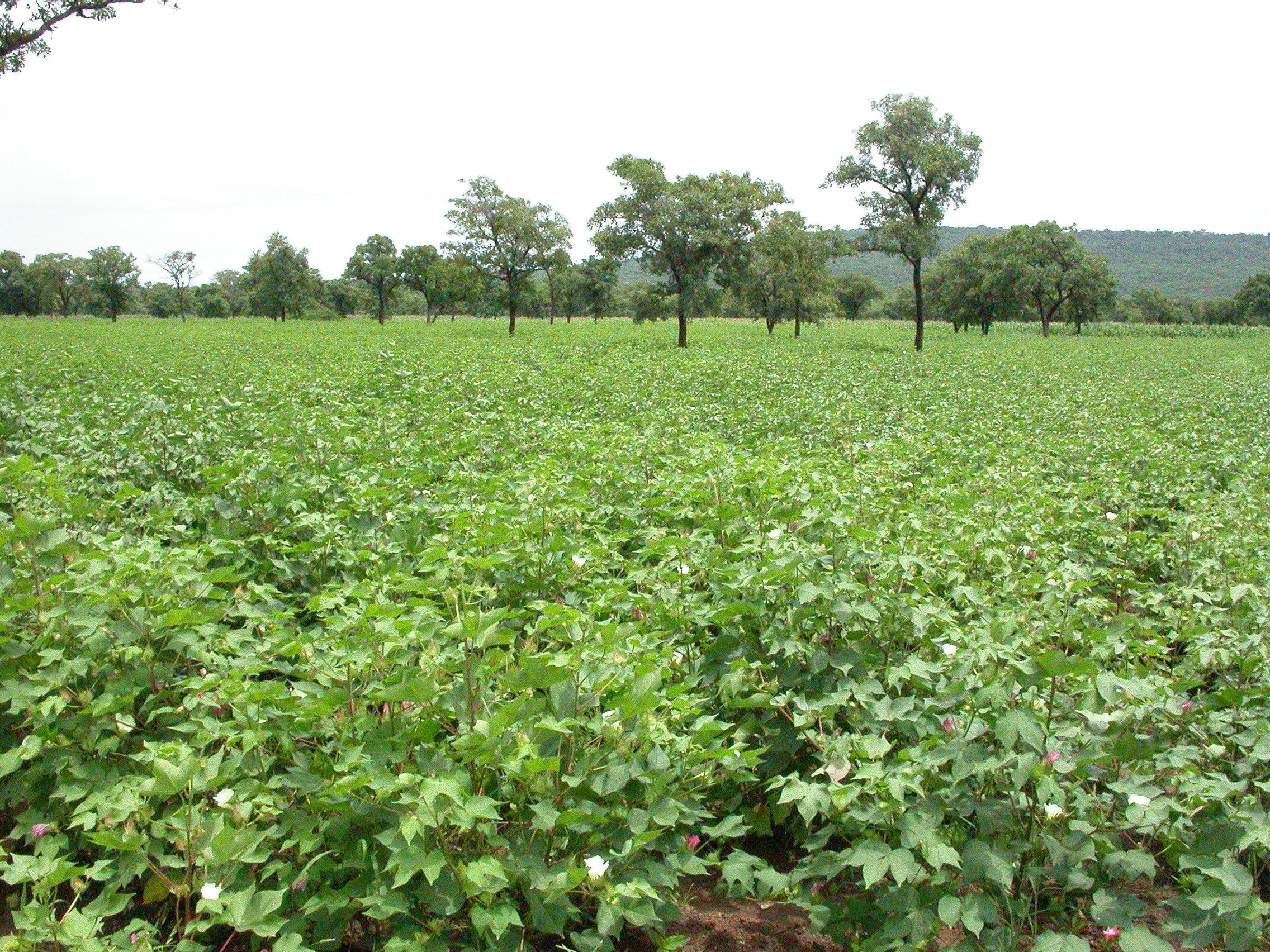
Cotton field in northern Benin

To raise growth still further, Benin plans to attract more foreign investment, place more emphasis on tourism, facilitate the development of new food processing systems and agricultural products, and encourage new information and communication technology. Projects to improve the business climate by reforms to the land tenure system, the commercial justice system, and the financial sector were included in Benin's US$307 million Millennium Challenge Account grant signed in February 2006.

The Paris Club and bilateral creditors have eased the external debt situation, with Benin benefiting from a G8 debt reduction announced in July 2005, while pressing for more rapid structural reforms. An "insufficient" electrical supply continues to "adversely affect" Benin's economic growth and the government has taken steps to increase domestic power production.

While trade unions in Benin represent up to 75% of the formal workforce, the informal economy has been noted by the International Trade Union Confederation (ITUC) to contain ongoing problems, including a lack of women's wage equality, the use of child labor, and the continuing issue of forced labor. Benin is a member of the Organization for the Harmonization of Business Law in Africa (OHADA).

Cotonou has the country's only seaport and international airport. Benin is connected by 2-lane asphalted roads to its neighboring countries (Togo, Burkina Faso, Niger, and Nigeria). Mobile telephone service is available across the country through operators. ADSL connections are available in some areas. Benin is connected to the Internet by way of satellite connections (since 1998) and a single submarine cable SAT-3/WASC (since 2001). Relief of "high price" is expected with the initiation of the Africa Coast to Europe cable in 2011.

With the GDP growth rate of 4%–5% remaining consistent over two decades, poverty has been increasing. According to the National Institute of Statistics and Economic Analysis in Benin, those living under the poverty line have increased from 36.2% in 2011 to 40.1% in 2015.

=== Science and technology ===
==== National policy framework ====
The Ministry of Higher Education and Scientific Research is responsible for implementing science policy. The National Directorate of Scientific and Technological Research handles planning and coordination, whereas the National Council for Scientific and Technical Research and National Academy of Sciences, Arts, and Letters each play an advisory role. Financial support comes from Benin's National Fund for Scientific Research and Technological Innovation. The Benin Agency for the Promotion of Research Results and Technological Innovation carries out technology transfer through the development and dissemination of research results. Benin was ranked 119th in the Global Innovation Index in 2024, but its rank advanced to 118th in 2025.

The regulatory framework has evolved since 2006 when the science policy was prepared. This has been updated and complemented by new texts on science and innovation (the year of adoption is between brackets):

- a manual for monitoring and evaluating research structures and organizations (2013);
- a manual on how to select research programmes and projects and apply to the National Fund for Scientific Research and Technological Innovation (2013) for competitive grants;
- a draft act for funding scientific research and innovation and a draft code of ethics for scientific research and innovation were both submitted to the Supreme Court in 2014;
- a strategic plan for scientific research and innovation (under development in 2015).

Equally important are Benin's efforts to integrate science into existing policy documents:

- Benin Development Strategies 2025: Benin 2025 Alafia (2000);
- Growth Strategy for Poverty Reduction 2011–2016 (2011);
- Phase 3 of the Ten-year Development Plan for the Education Sector, covering 2013–2015;
- Development Plan for Higher Education and Scientific Research 2013–2017 (2014).

In 2015, Benin's priority areas for scientific research were: health, education, construction and building materials, transportation and trade, culture, tourism and handicrafts, cotton/textiles, food, energy and climate change.

Some so-called challenges facing research and development in Benin are:

- the unfavorable organizational framework for research: weak governance, a lack of co-operation between research structures and the absence of an official document on the status of researchers;
- the inadequate use of human resources and the lack of any motivational policy for researchers; and
- the mismatch between research and development needs.

==== Human and financial investment in research ====
In 2007, Benin counted 1,000 researchers (in headcounts). This corresponds to 115 researchers per million inhabitants. The "main research structures" are the Centre for Scientific and Technical Research, National Institute of Agricultural Research, the National Institute for Training and Research in Education, Office of Geological and Mining Research, and the Centre for Entomological Research.

The University of Abomey-Calavi was selected by the World Bank in 2014 to participate in its Centres of Excellence project, owing to its expertise in applied mathematics. Within this project, the World Bank has loaned $8 million to Benin. The Association of African Universities has received funds to enable it to co-ordinate knowledge-sharing among the 19 universities in West Africa involved in the project.

There are "no available data" on Benin's level of investment in research and development.

In 2013, the government devoted 2.5% of GDP to public health. In December 2014, 150 volunteer health professionals traveled to Guinea, Liberia and Sierra Leone from Benin, Côte d'Ivoire, Ghana, Mali, Niger, and Nigeria, as part of a joint initiative by the Economic Community of West African States (ECOWAS) and its specialized agency, the West African Health Organisation, to help combat the epidemic. The Ebola epidemic has been a reminder of the underinvestment in West African health systems.

The Government of Benin devoted less than 5% of GDP to agricultural development in 2010, while the members of the African Union had agreed to commit at least 10% of GDP to this area in the Maputo Declaration of 2003. They reiterated this goal in the Malabo Declaration adopted in Equatorial Guinea in 2014. In the latter declaration, they reaffirmed their 'intention to devote 10% of their national budgets to agricultural development and agreed to targets such as doubling agricultural productivity, halving post-harvest loss and bringing stunting down to 10% across Africa'. African leaders meeting in Equatorial Guinea failed to resolve the debate on establishing a common standard of measurement for the 10% target.

==== Research output ====
Benin has the third-highest publication intensity for scientific journals in West Africa, according to Thomson Reuters' Web of Science, Science Citation Index Expanded. There were 25.5 scientific articles per million inhabitants cataloged in this database in 2014. This compares with 65.0 for the Gambia, 49.6 for Cape Verde, 23.2 for Senegal, and 21.9 for Ghana. The volume of publications in this database tripled in Benin between 2005 and 2014 from 86 to 270. Between 2008 and 2014, Benin's "main scientific collaborators" were based in France (529 articles), the United States (261), United Kingdom (254), Belgium (198), and Germany (156).

=== Transportation ===
Transport in Benin includes road, rail, water, and air transportation. Benin possesses a total of 6,787 km of highway, of which 1,357 km are paved. Of the paved highways in the country, there are 10 expressways. This leaves 5,430 km of unpaved road. The Trans-West African Coastal Highway crosses Benin, connecting it to Nigeria to the east, and Togo, Ghana and Ivory Coast to the west. When construction in Liberia and Sierra Leone is finished, the highway will continue west to 7 other Economic Community of West African States (ECOWAS) nations. A paved highway connects Benin northwards to Niger, and through that country to Burkina Faso and Mali to the north-west.

Rail transport in Benin consists of 578 km (359 mi) of single track, 1,000 mm (3 ft 3 3/8 in) metre gauge railway. Construction work has commenced on international lines connecting Benin with Niger and Nigeria, with outline plans announced for further connections to Togo and Burkina Faso. Benin will be a participant in the AfricaRail project.

Cadjehoun Airport, located at Cotonou, has direct international jet service to Accra, Niamey, Monrovia, Lagos, Ouagadougou, Lomé, and Douala, and other cities in Africa. Direct services link Cotonou to Paris, Brussels, and Istanbul.

== Culture ==
=== Arts ===
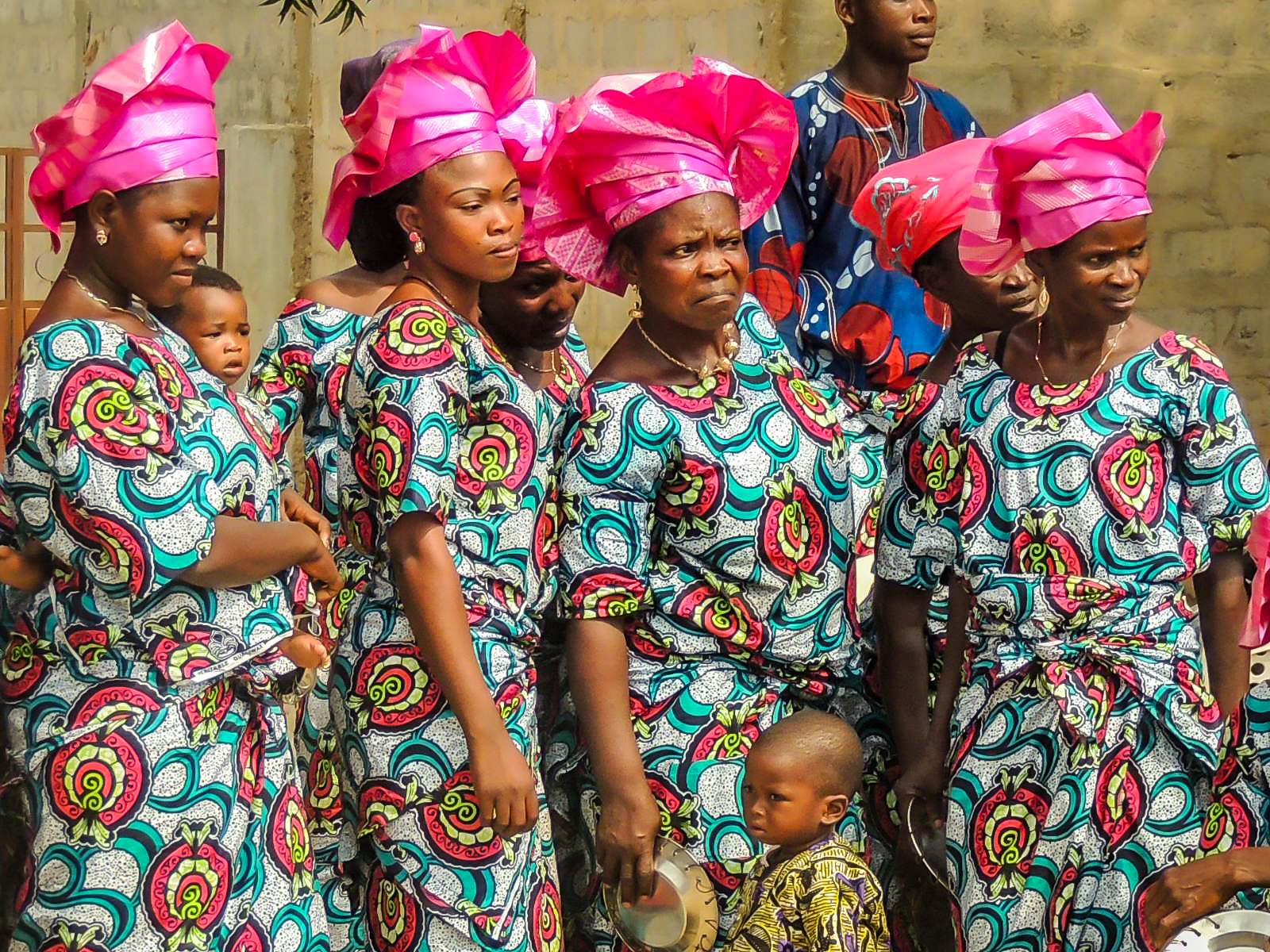
Music group

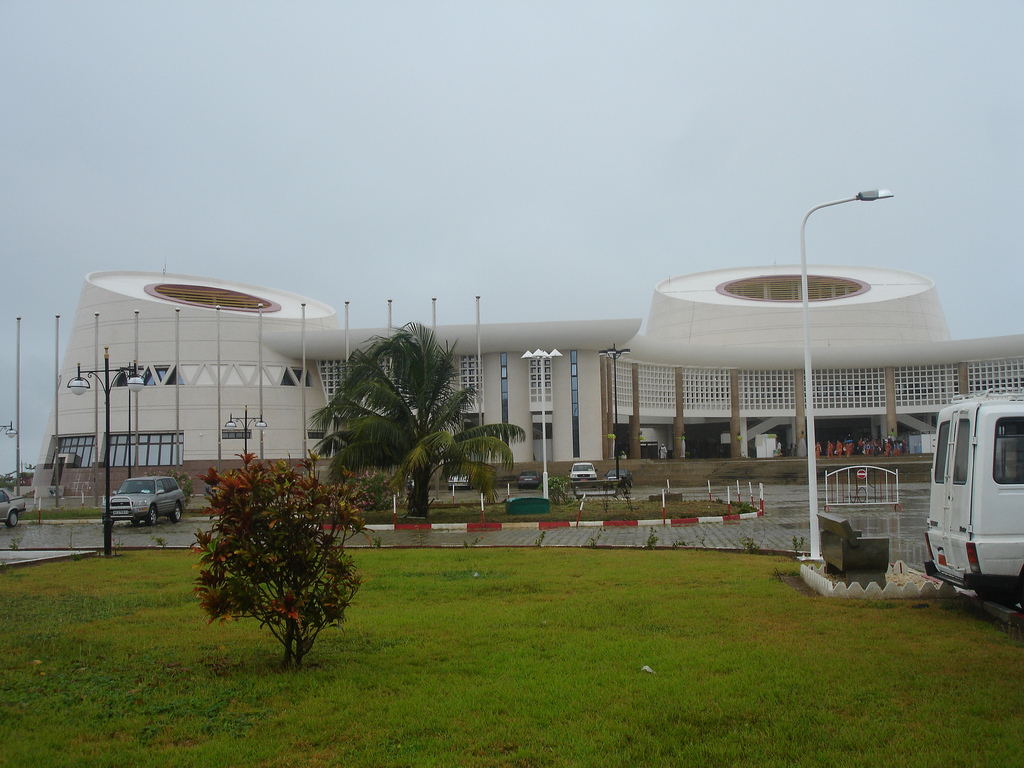
Palais des congrès in Cotonou

Beninese literature had an oral tradition before French became the dominant language. Félix Couchoro wrote the first Beninese novel, L'Esclave (The Slave), in 1929.

Post-independence, native folk music was combined with Ghanaian highlife, French cabaret, American rock, funk and soul, and Congolese rumba.

Biennale Benin, continuing the projects of some organizations and artists, started in the country in 2010 as a collaborative event called "Regard Benin". In 2012, the project became a biennial coordinated by a federation of local associations. The international exhibition and artistic program of the 2012 Biennale Benin were curated by Abdellah Karroum.

=== Customary names ===
Some Beninese in the south of the country have Akan-based names indicating the day of the week on which they were born. This is due to influence of the Akan people such as the Akwamu and others.

=== Traditional authorities ===
Benin has numerous non-sovereign monarchies within the country, many of them derivative of pre-colonial kingdoms (such as Arda). Non-sovereign monarchs serve a largely ceremonial role and are subservient to political and civil authorities. Despite this, they play an influential role in local political matters within their particular realms and are often courted by Beninese politicians for electoral support. Advocacy groups, such as the High Council of Kings of Benin, represent the monarchs nationally.

In 2025, Benin passed a law officially recognising 16 sub-national kingdoms, 80 paramount chiefdoms, and 10 customary chiefdoms across Benin.

=== Cuisine ===
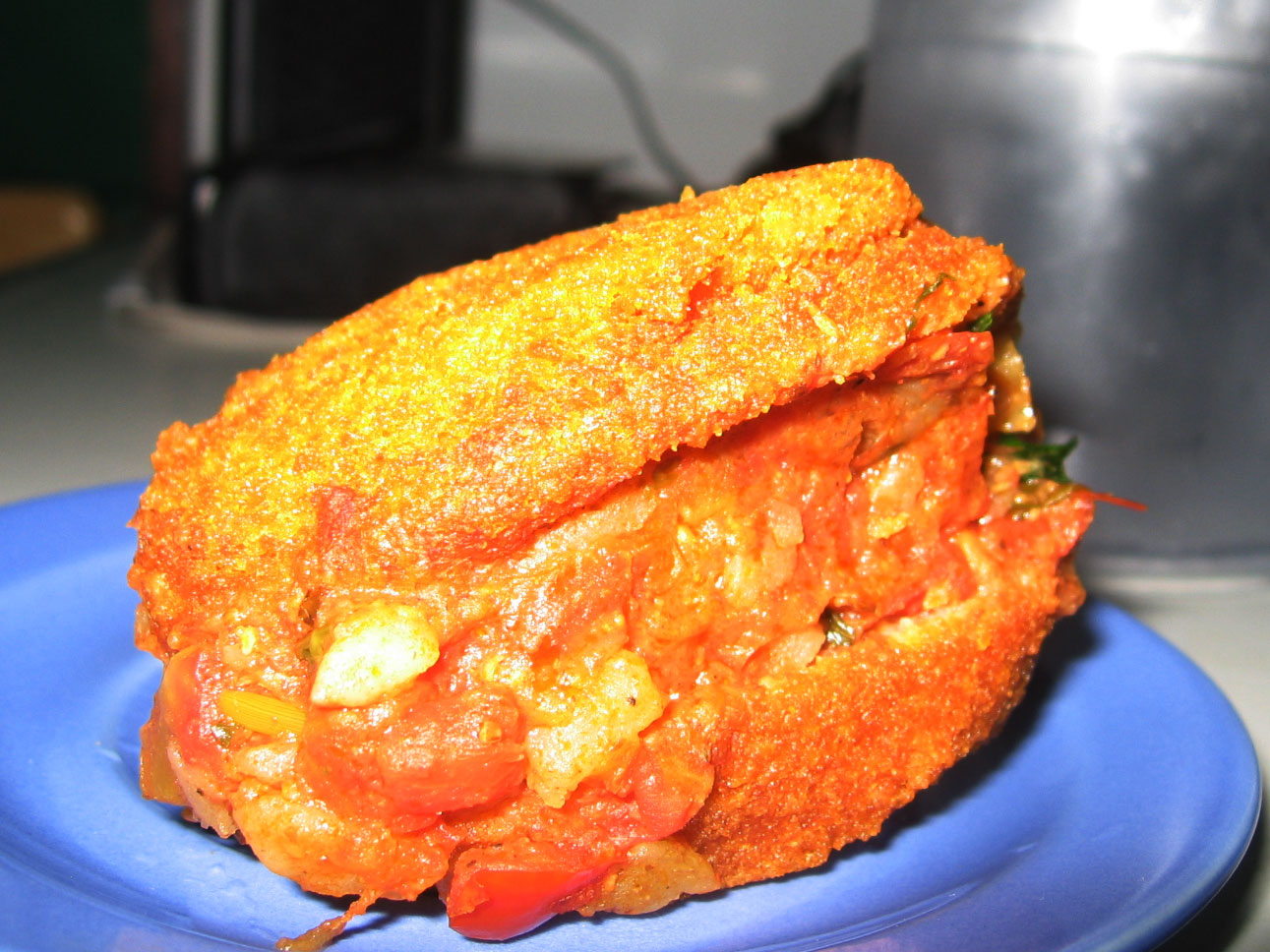
Acarajé is peeled black-eyed peas formed into a ball and then deep-fried.

Beninese cuisine involves fresh meals served with a variety of key sauces. In southern Beninese cuisine, an ingredient is corn, which has been used to prepare dough that has been served with peanut- or tomato-based sauces. Fish and chicken, beef, goat, and bush rat are consumed. A staple in northern Benin is yams, which has been served with sauces mentioned above. The population in the northern provinces use beef and pork meat that is fried in palm or peanut oil or cooked in sauces. Cheese is used in some dishes. Couscous, rice, and beans are eaten, along with fruits such as mangoes, oranges, avocados, bananas, kiwi fruit, and pineapples.

Meals are said to be generally light on meat and generous on vegetable fat. Frying in palm or peanut oil is a meat preparation, and smoked fish is prepared in Benin. Grinders are used to prepare corn flour, which is made into a dough and served with sauces. Chicken on the spit is a recipe in which chicken is roasted over a fire on wooden sticks. Palm roots are sometimes soaked in a jar with salt water and sliced garlic to tenderize them, then used in dishes. Some people have outdoor mud stoves for cooking.

=== Sports ===
The major sports in Benin are association football, basketball, golf, cycling, baseball, softball, tennis and rugby union. In the early 21st century, baseball and teqball were introduced to the country.

== See also ==
- Outline of Benin
- Telephone numbers in Benin
- Dahomey Gap
