= Bashu =

Bashu can refer to:

- Bashu, the Little Stranger
- Bashu or Ba–Shu, a region associated with modern-day Chongqing and Sichuan, named due to the ancient Chinese state of Ba and the independent Kingdom of Shu coinciding with the Shang and Zhou dynasties
  - Ba–Shu Chinese, also known as Old Sichuanese, an extinct Sinitic (Chinese) language spoken in Sichuan
  - Ba–Shu culture
- Bashu Secondary School, located in Yuzhong District, Chongqing, China

== See also ==
- Ba (state)
- Shu (kingdom)
- Vasu (disambiguation)
- Bashundhara (disambiguation)
- Bashuki
- Bashur
- Alain Bashung
