= Bose–Einstein =

Bose–Einstein may refer to:

- Bose–Einstein condensate, a phase of matter in quantum mechanics
  - Bose–Einstein condensation (network theory), the application of this model in network theory
  - Bose–Einstein condensation of polaritons
  - Bose–Einstein condensation of quasiparticles
- Bose–Einstein correlations
- Bose–Einstein integral
- Bose–Einstein statistics, in particle statistics

== See also ==
- Bose (disambiguation)
- Einstein (disambiguation)
- Boson (disambiguation)
- Satyendra Nath Bose, Indian physicist
- Albert Einstein (disambiguation)
