= Bose =

Bose may refer to:

- Bose (crater), a lunar crater.
- Bose (film), a 2004 Indian Tamil film starring Srikanth and Sneha
- Bose (surname), a surname (and list of people with the name)
- Bose (given name), a given name
- Bose, Italy, a frazione in Magnano, Province of Biella
  - Bose Monastic Community, a monastic community in the village
- Bose, Poland
- Bose Corporation, an audio company
- Bose Ogulu, Nigerian manager of Burna Boy
- Baise, or Bose, a prefecture-level city in Guangxi, China
- Bose: The Forgotten Hero, a 2004 Indian film about Subhas Chandra Bose
- Bose: Dead/Alive, a web series about Subhas Chandra Bose

== See also ==
- Boise (disambiguation)
- Bos (disambiguation)
- Bose–Einstein (disambiguation), articles relating to Bose–Einstein statistics and its consequences
- Boson (disambiguation)
- Basu, alternative transliteration of the Indian surname Bose
- Basu Poribar (disambiguation)
- Vasu (disambiguation)
