= Ba–Shu scripts =

Three undeciphered scripts

- Traditional Chinese: 巴蜀圖語
- Simplified Chinese: 巴蜀图语
- Literal meaning: Ba and Shu picture script
Transcriptions
Standard Mandarin
- Hanyu Pinyin: Bā Shǔ tú yǔ

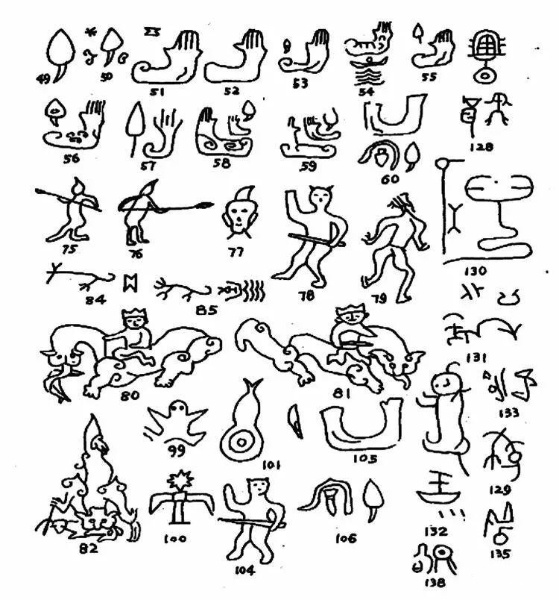
Ba–Shu pictographic symbols

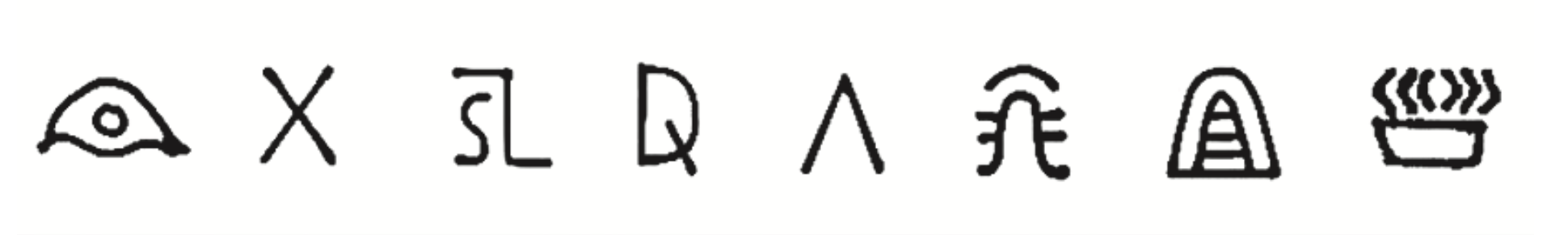
Symbols found on artefacts from Sanxingdui

The Ba–Shu scripts are three undeciphered scripts found on bronzeware from the ancient kingdoms of Ba and Shu in the Sichuan Basin of southwestern China in the 5th and 4th centuries BC. Numerous signature seals have been found in Ba–Shu graves, suggesting that the states used written records, though none have been found. The known inscriptions are too few to be deciphered, or even to identify the language recorded.

== Scripts ==
The first script consists of pictographic symbols decorating weapons found in Ba graves in eastern Sichuan. About two hundred individual symbols have been identified. The most common depict human faces, hands and figures, tigers, turtles, dragons, flowers, birds and cicadas. There are also some abstract forms. The longest inscription, on a lacquer tray found near Changsha, Hunan, consists of 11 symbols.

The second script is found in both western and eastern Sichuan, on five halberd blades, a belt buckle and the base of a bronze vessel. Some scholars believe this script to be phonetic, pointing to similarities between some of the symbols and symbols of the later Yi script. Except for one symbol resembling the Chinese character 王 ("king"), the symbols cannot be connected with Chinese characters, or with the earlier pictographic script.

The third script is known from a single sample, an inscription on the lid of a bronze vessel found in a grave in Baihuatan, Chengdu dating from c. 476 BC. It may also be phonetic.

== Gallery ==
=== Scripts ===
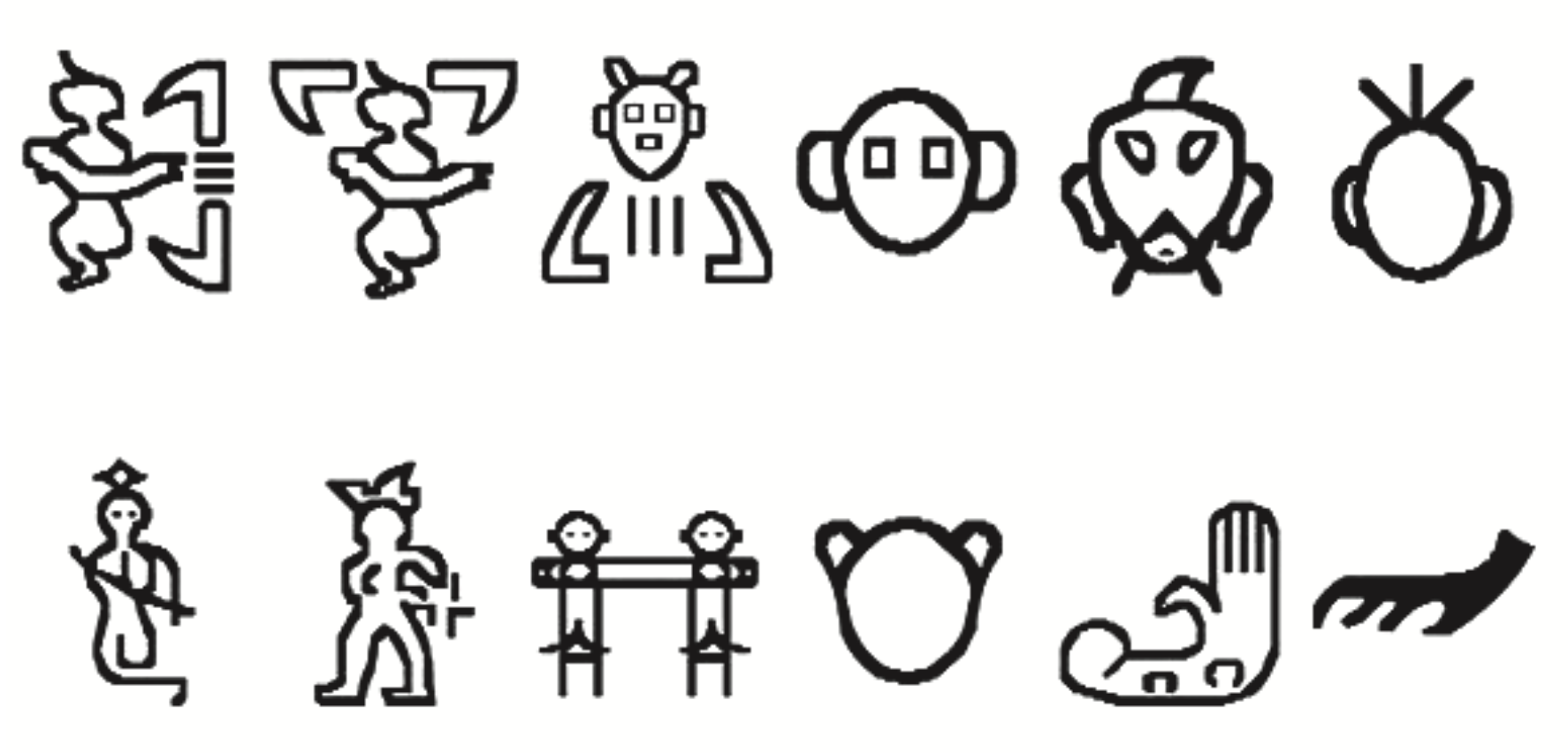
Symbols resembling human forms

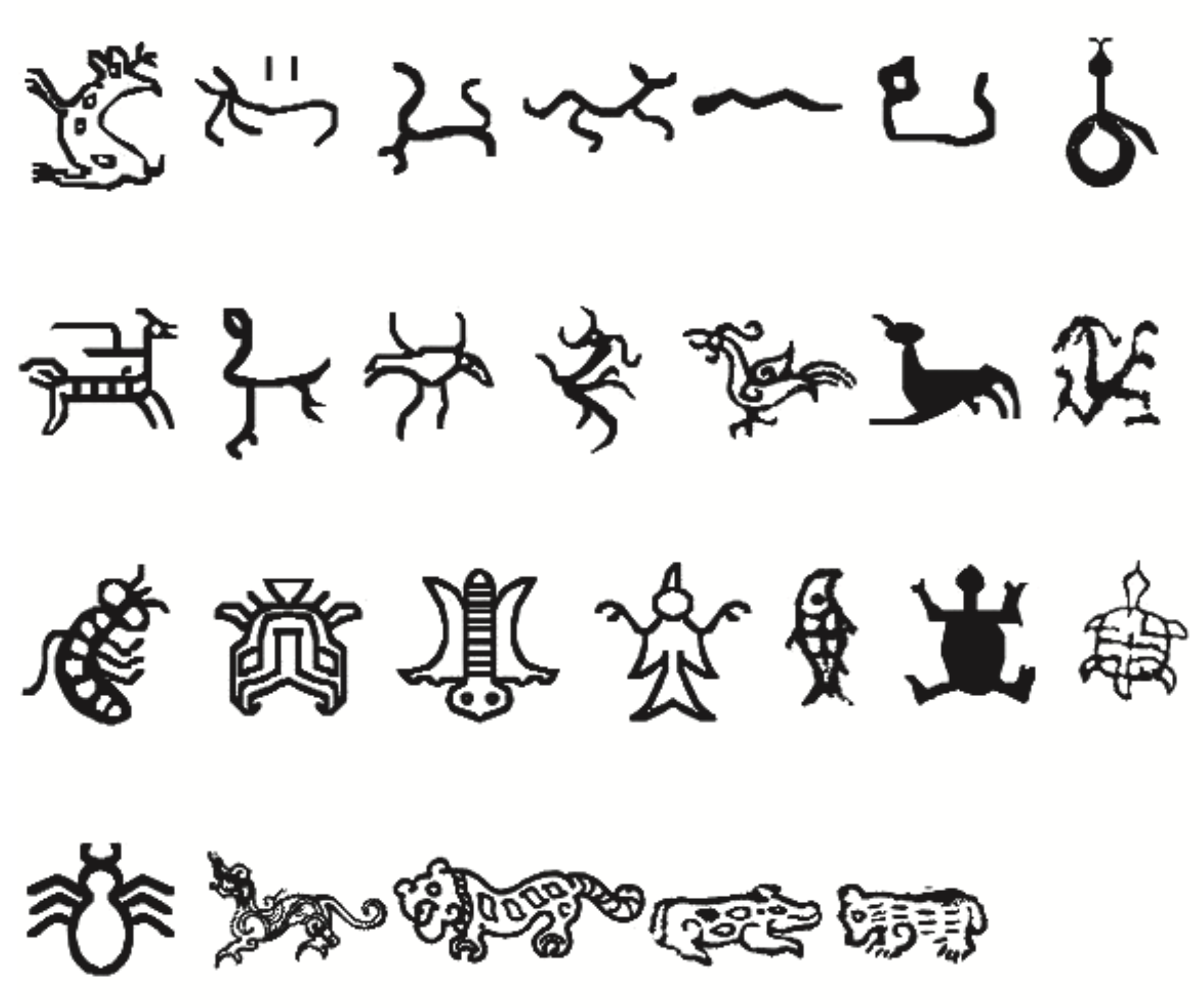
Symbols resembling animals

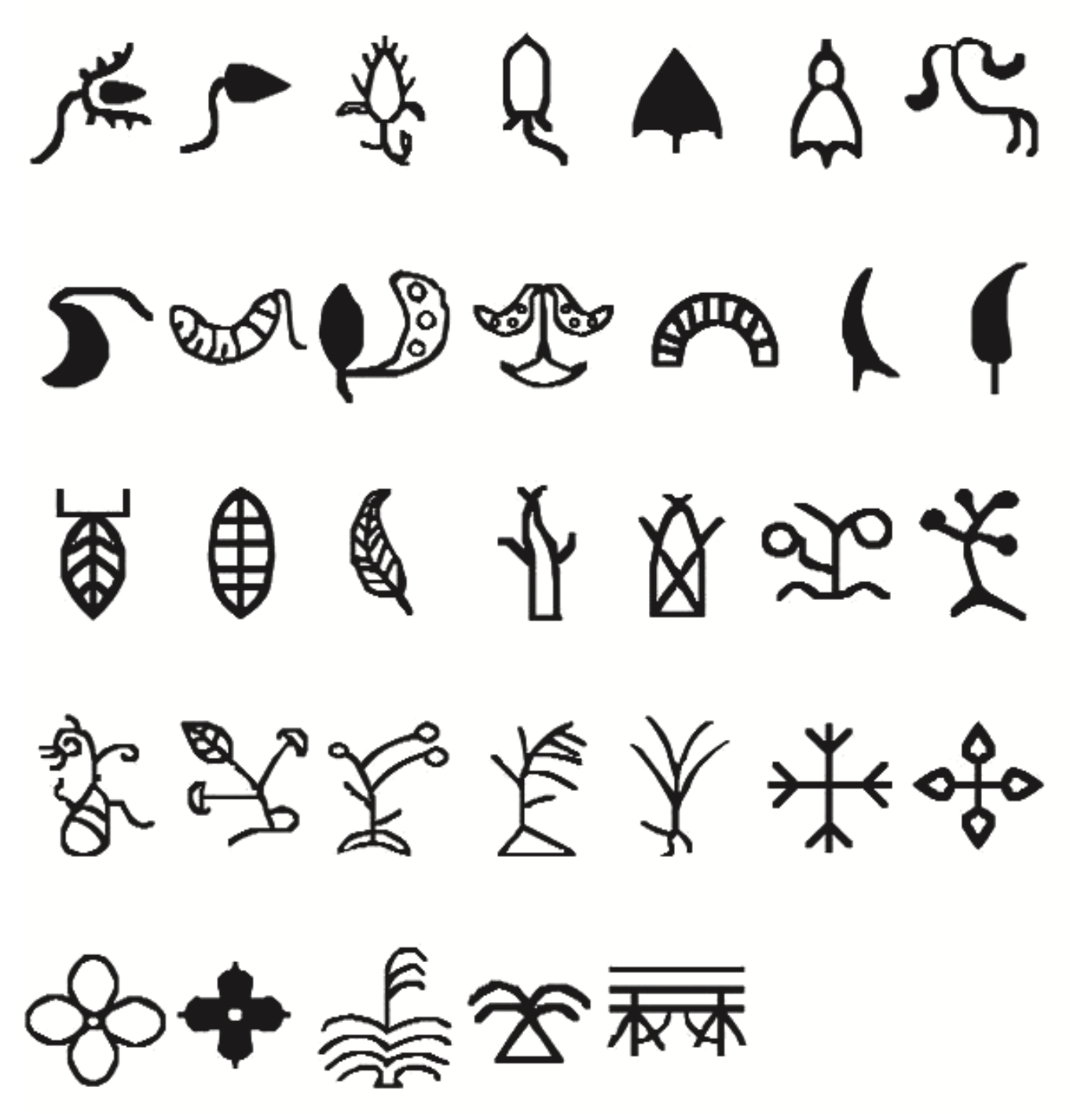
Symbols resembling plants

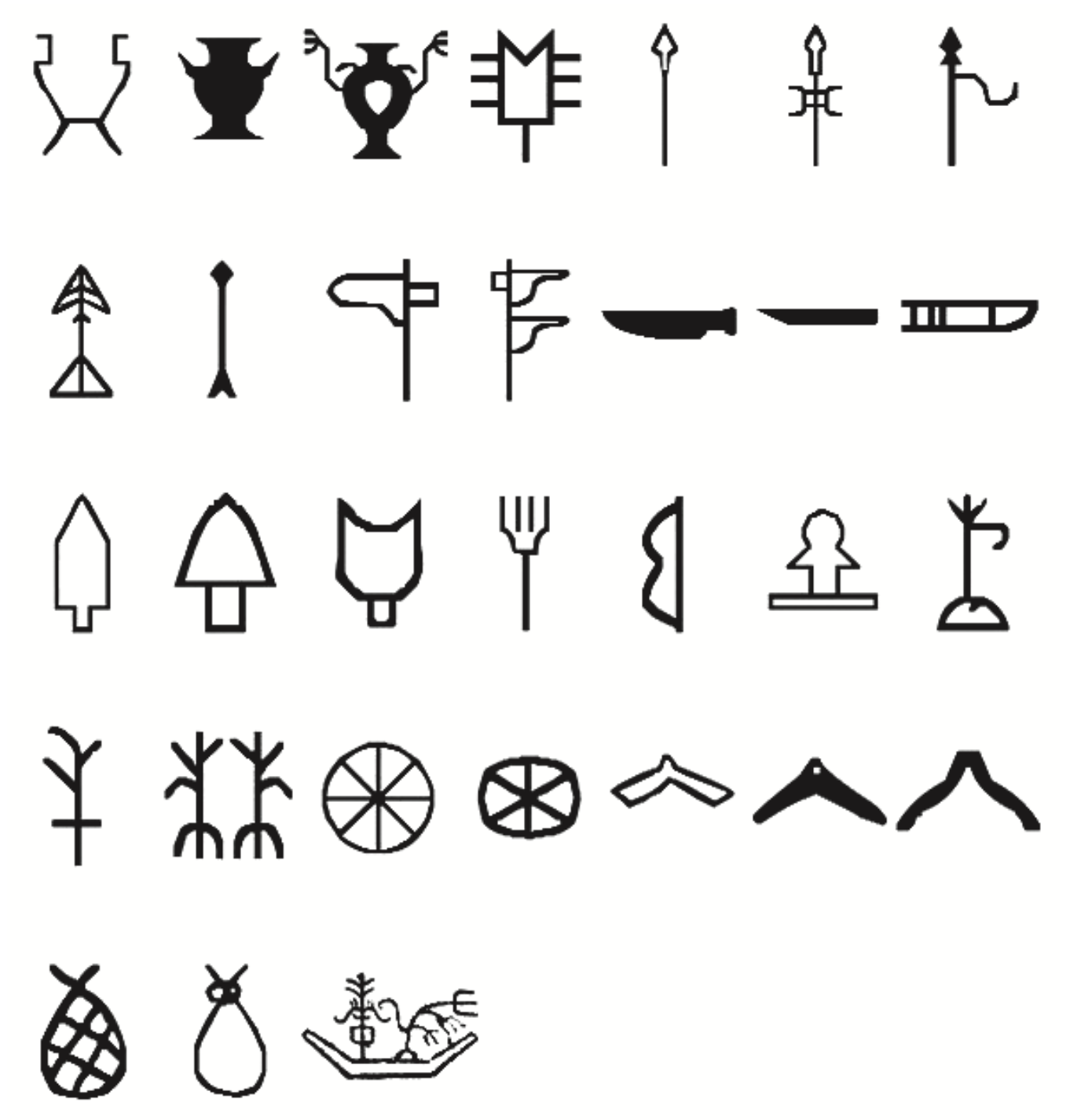
Symbols resembling everyday objects

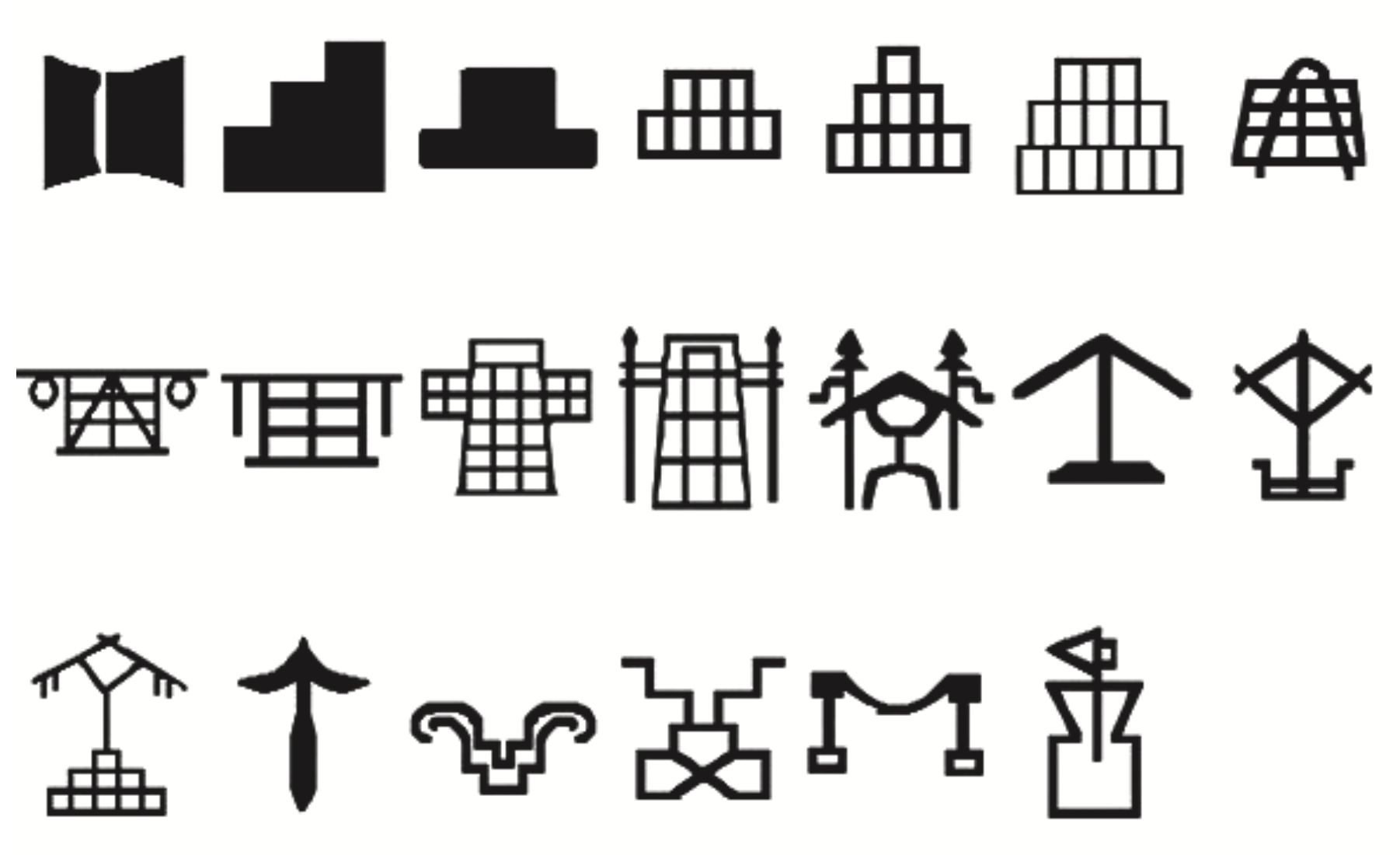
Symbols resembling architectural elements

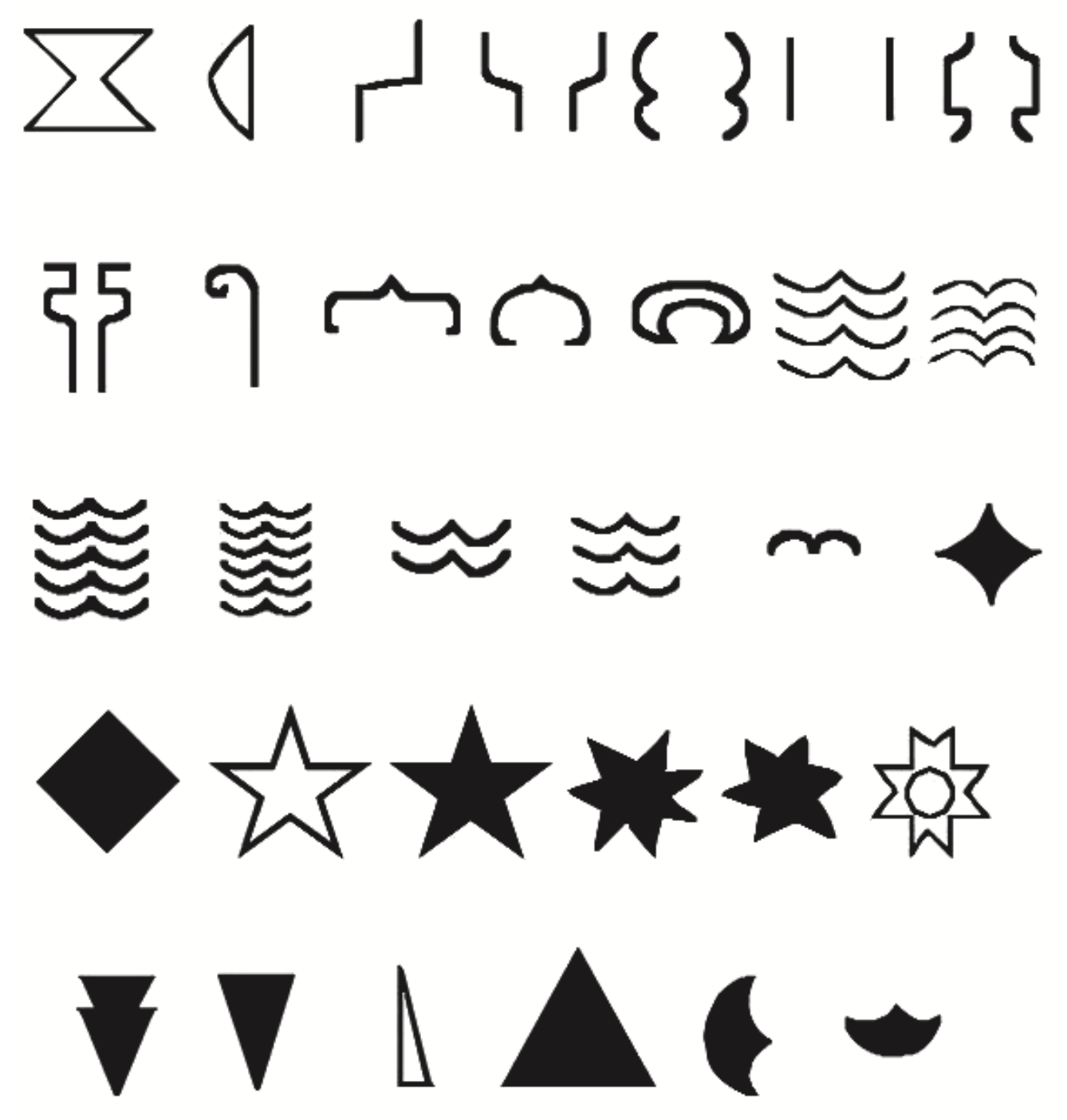
Symbols using geometric shapes

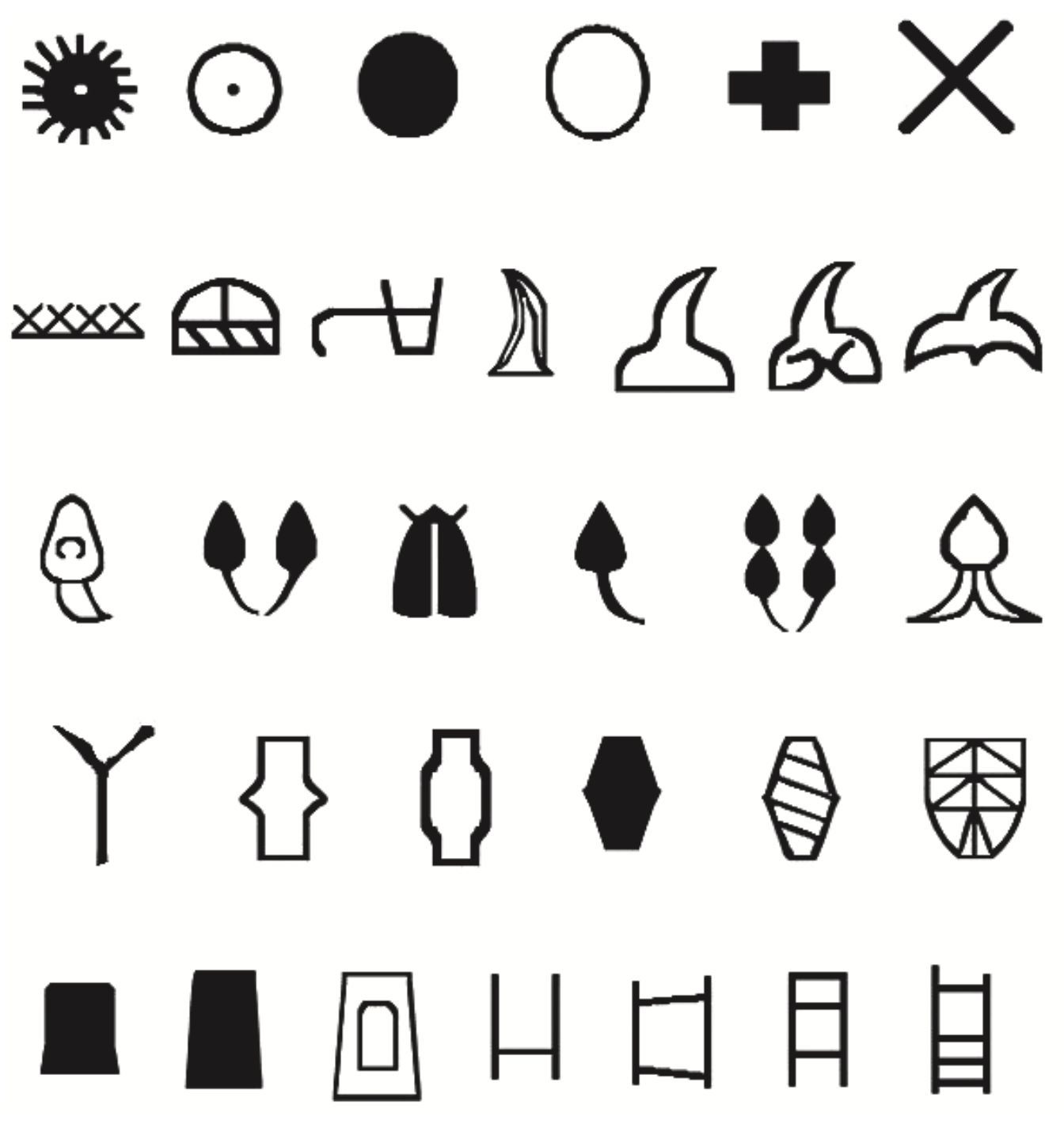
Symbols using geometric shapes

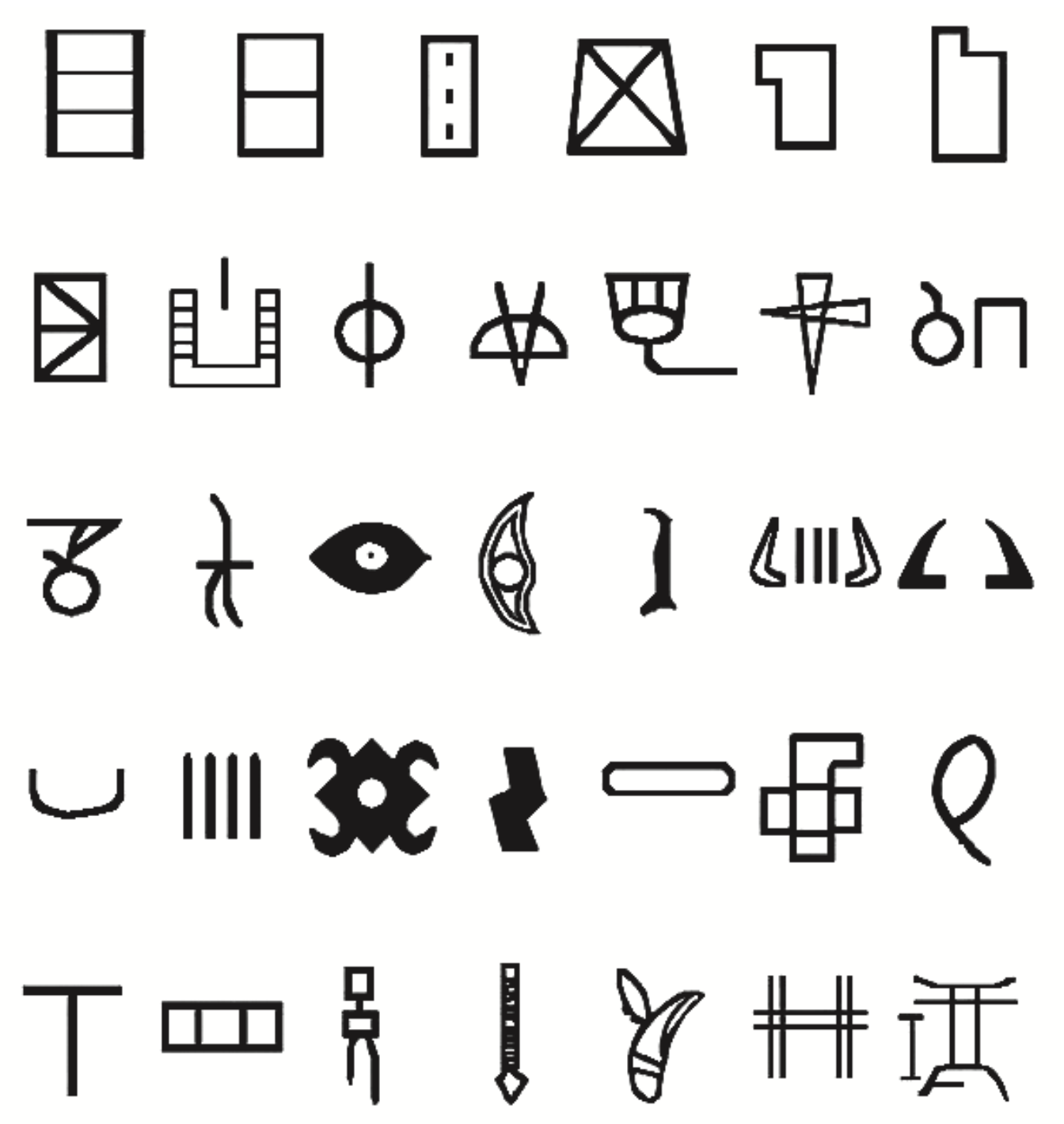
Symbols using geometric shapes

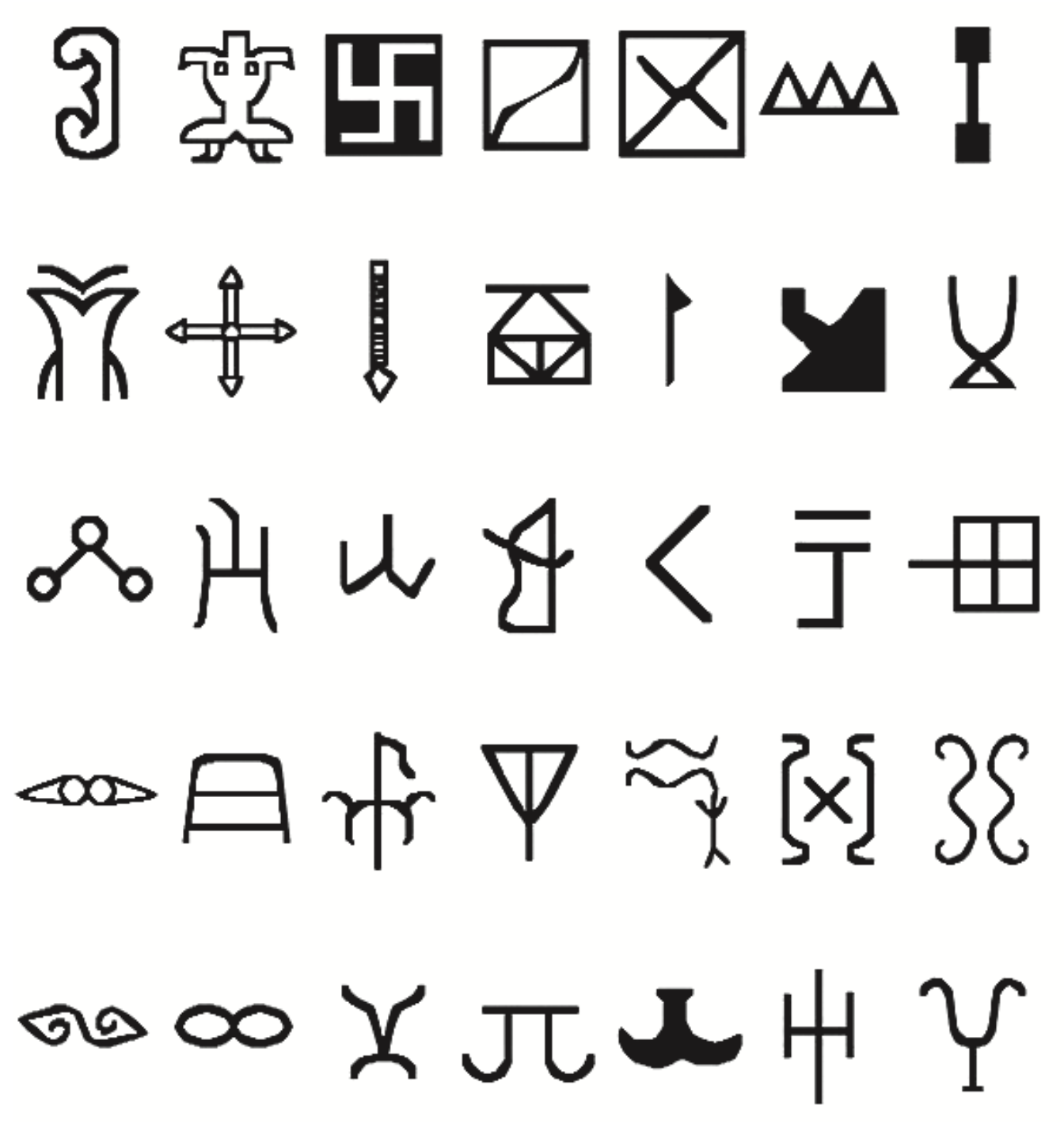
Symbols using geometric shapes

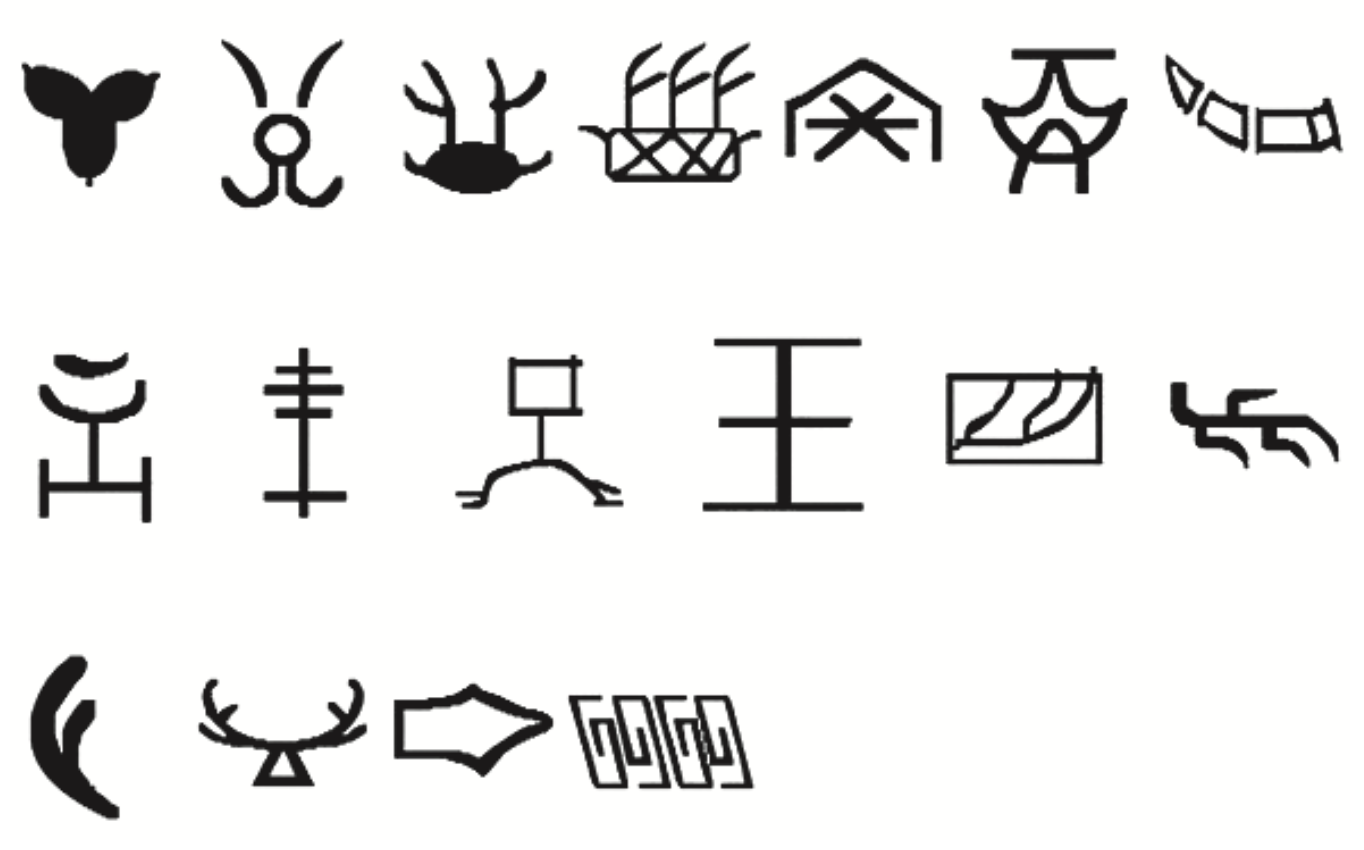
Symbols using geometric shapes

=== Artefacts ===
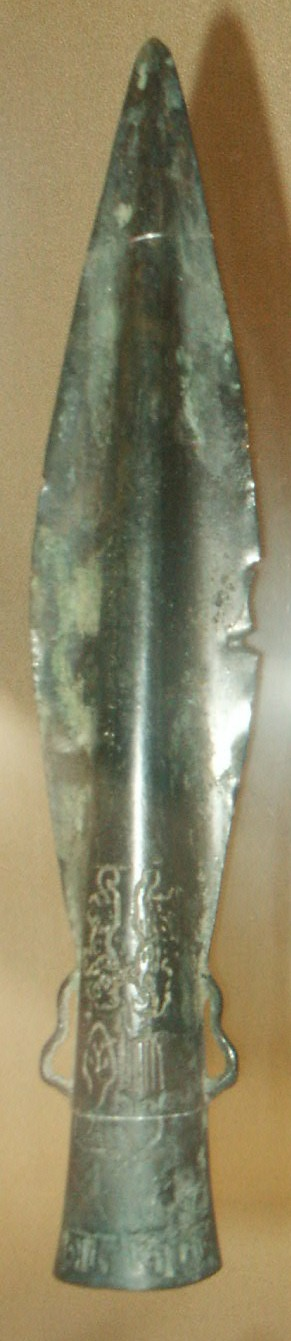
Spearhead with pictographic Ba symbols

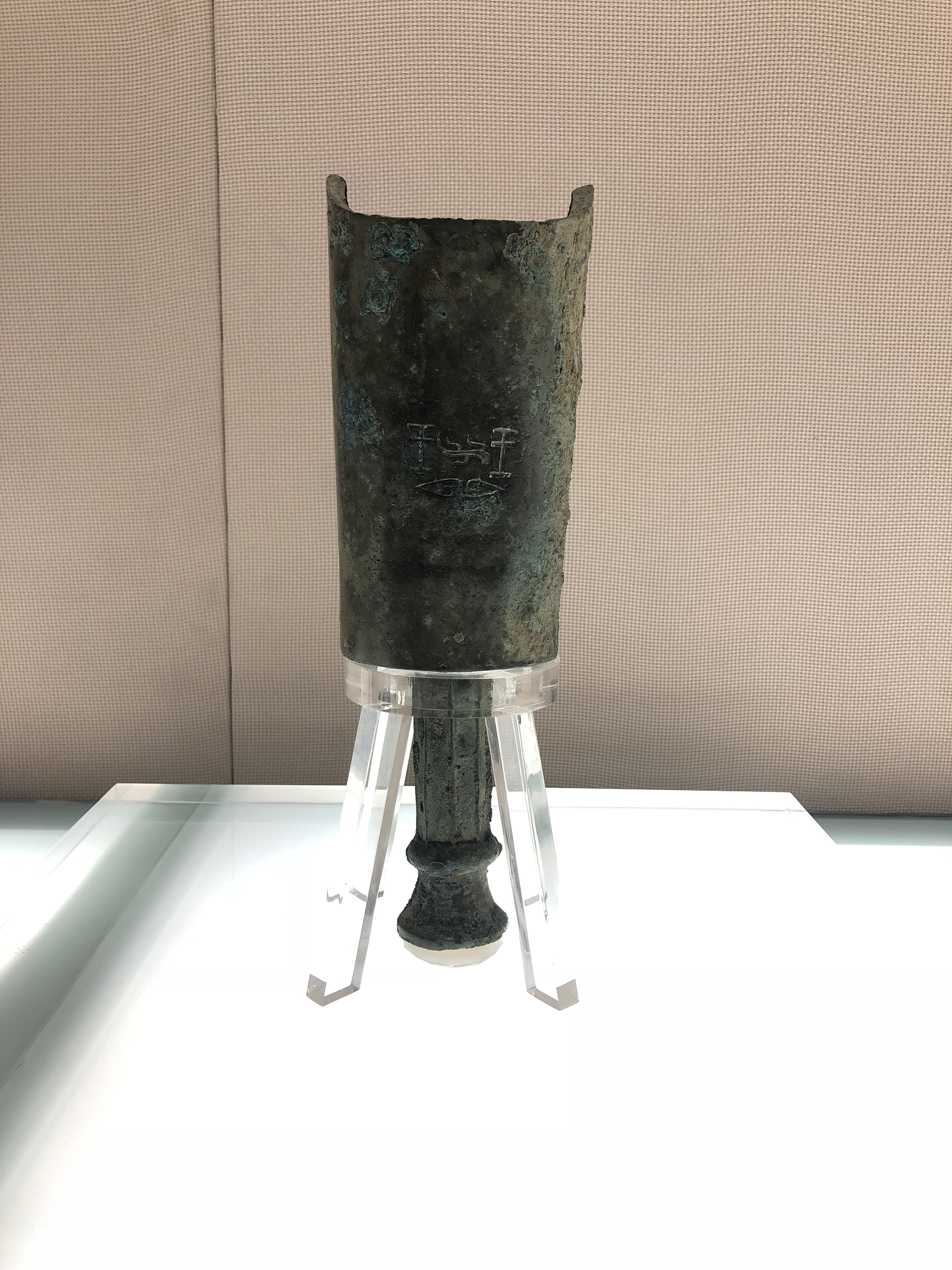

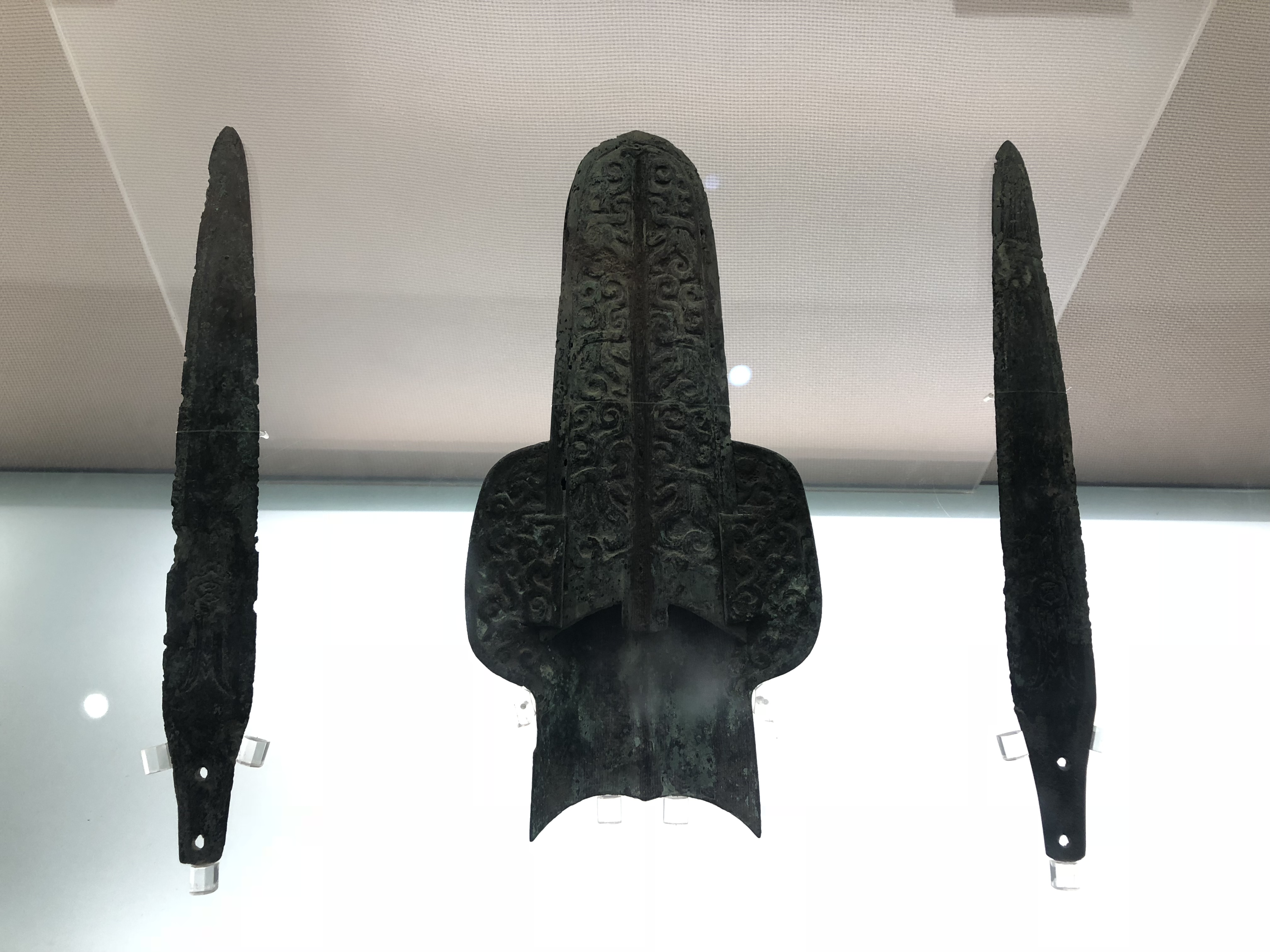

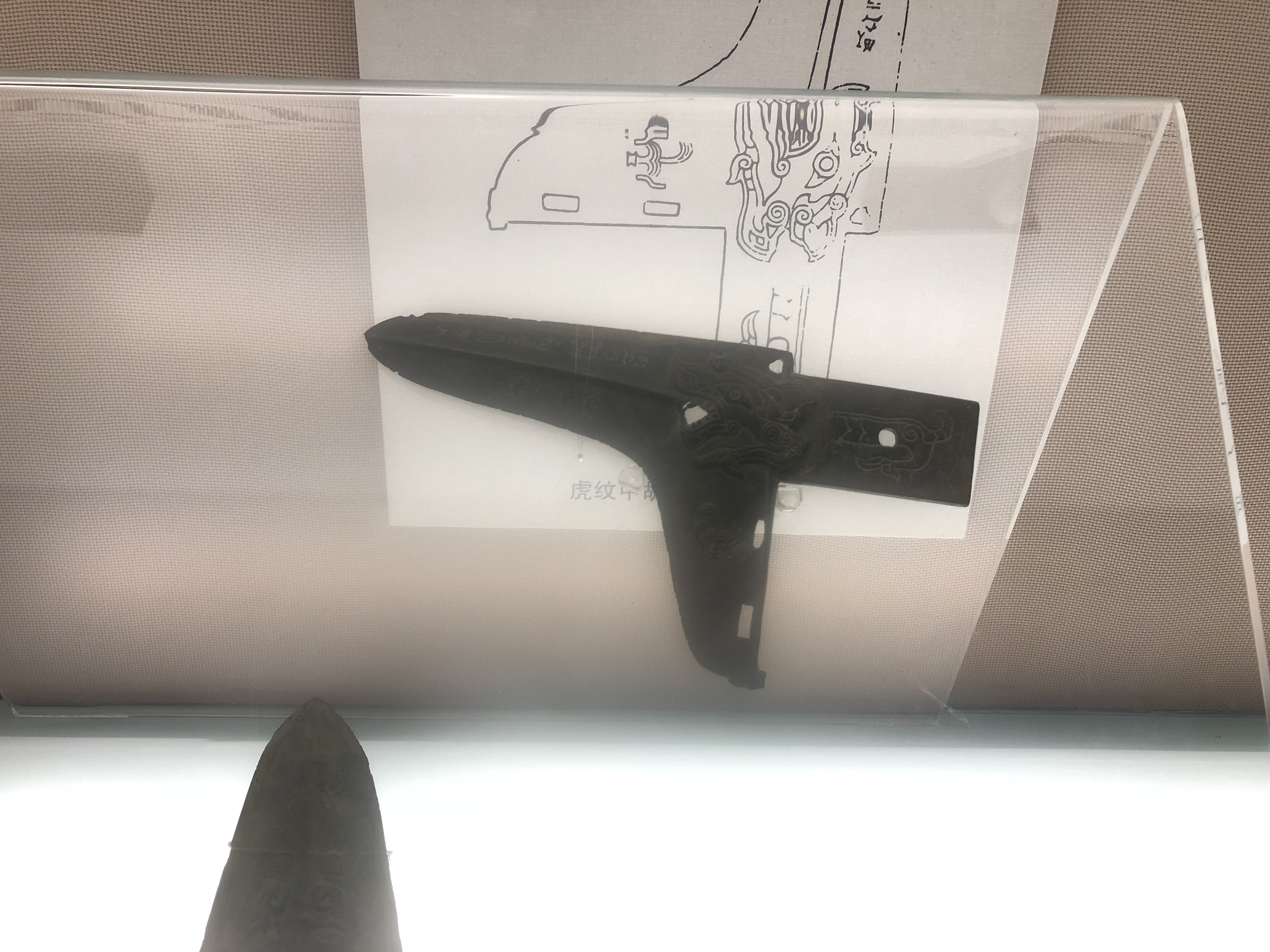

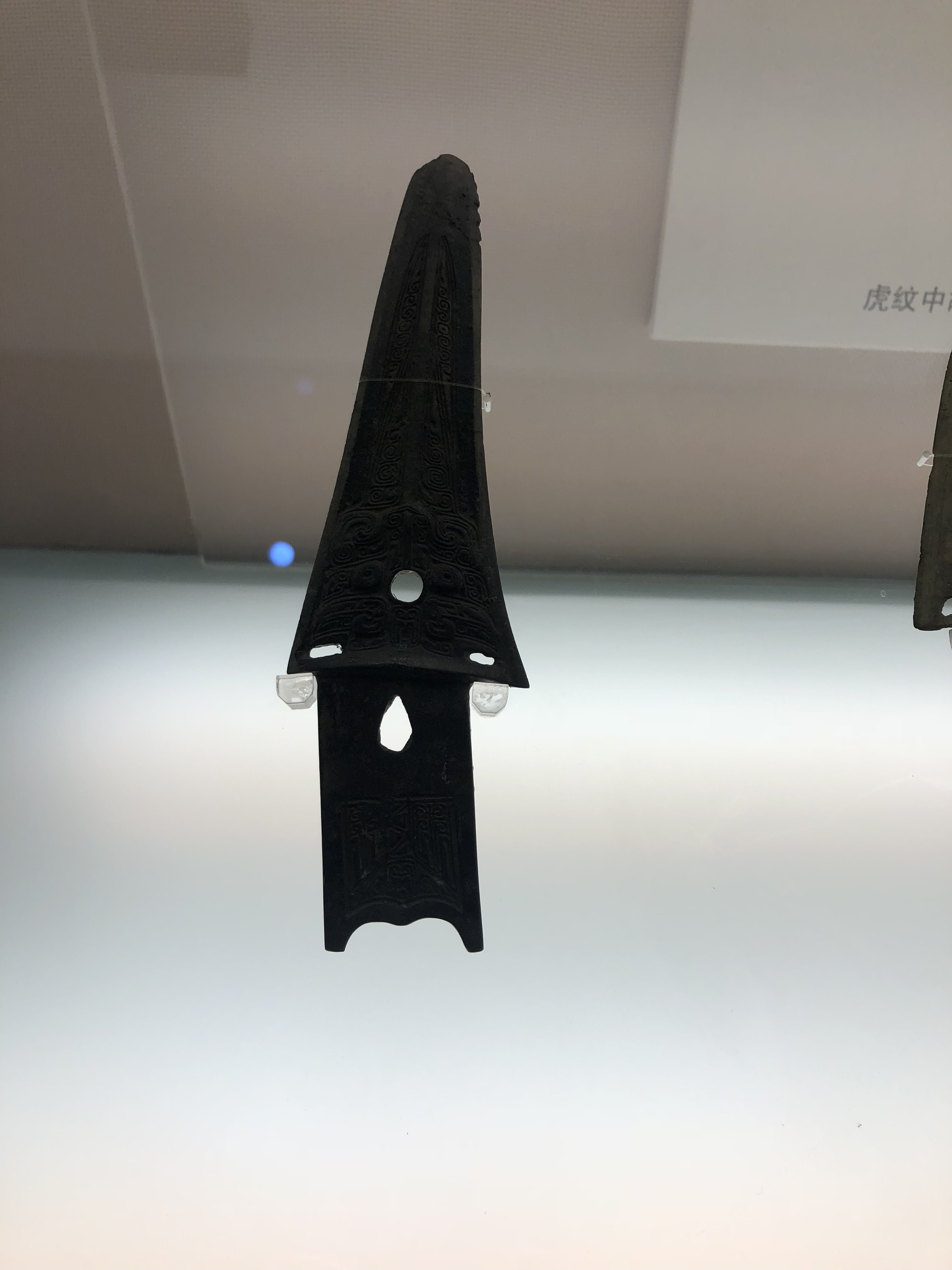

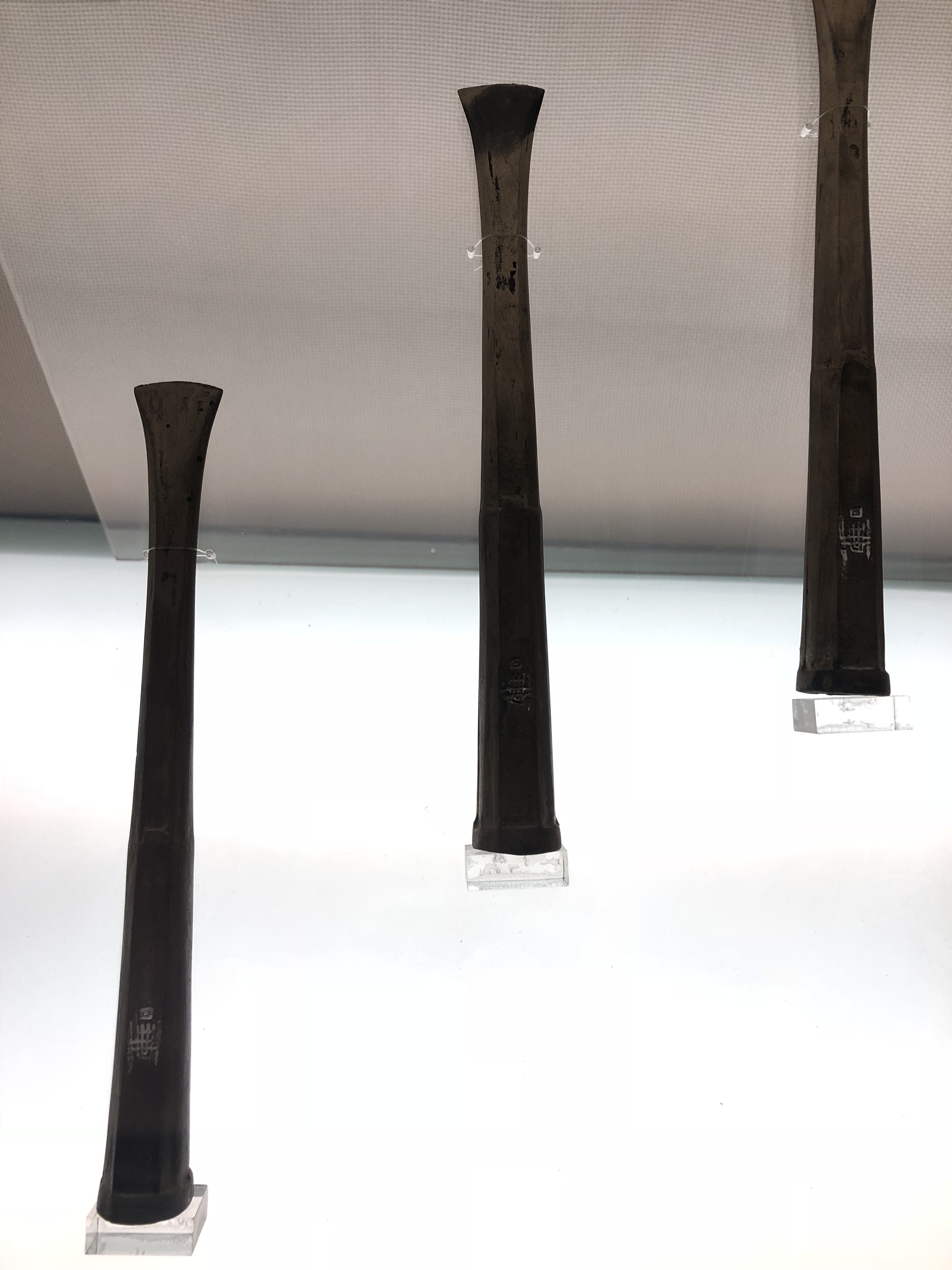

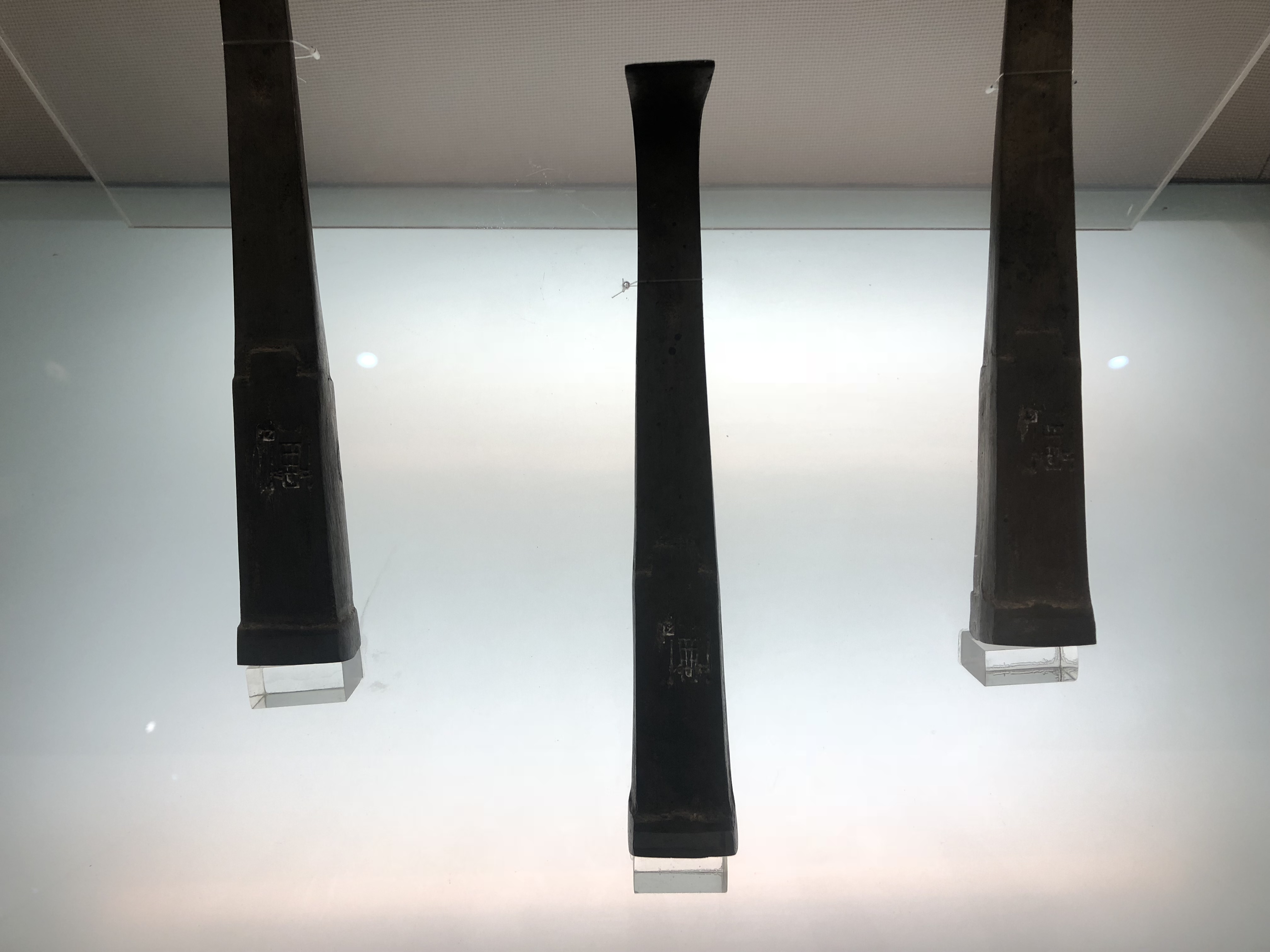

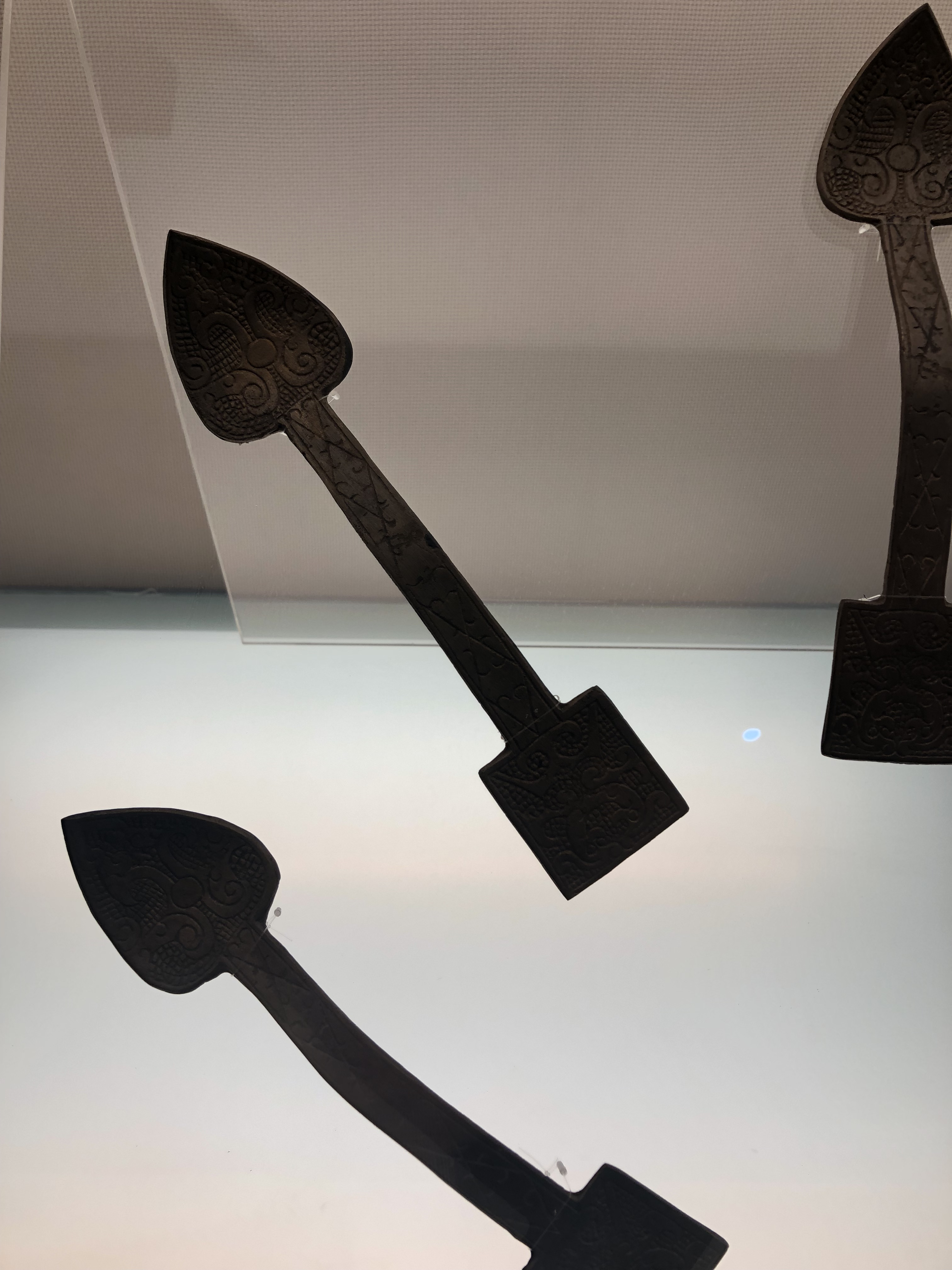

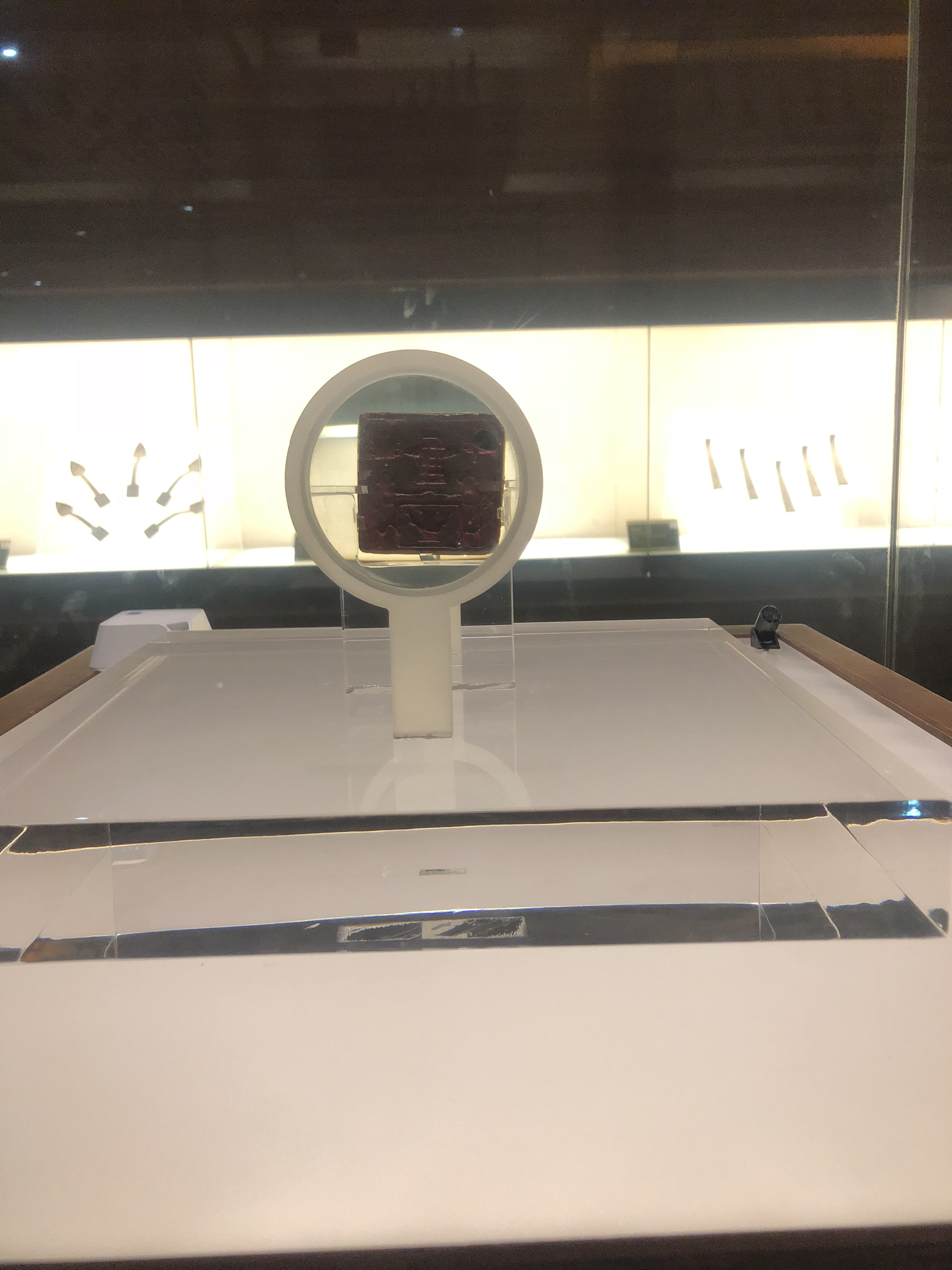

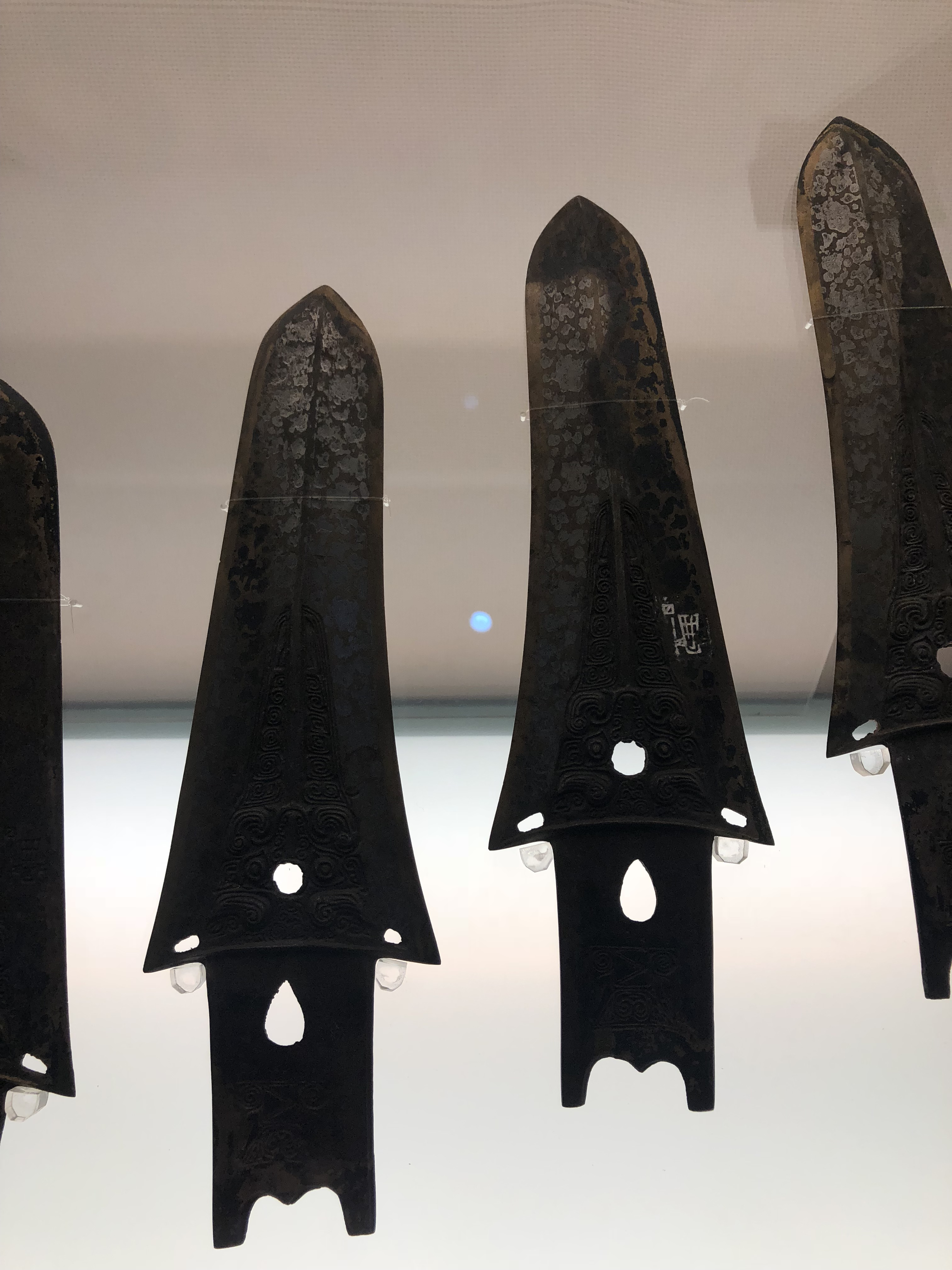

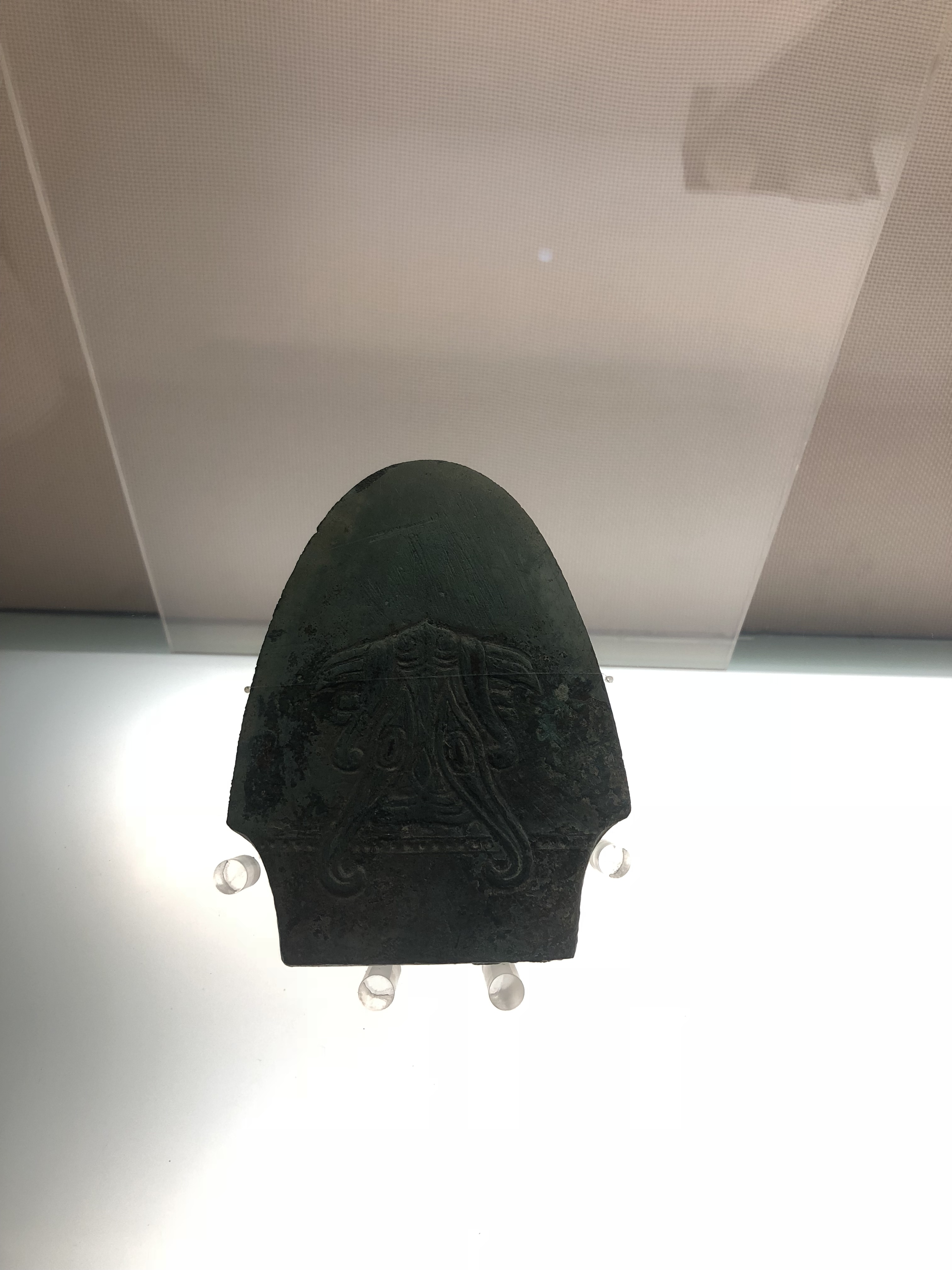

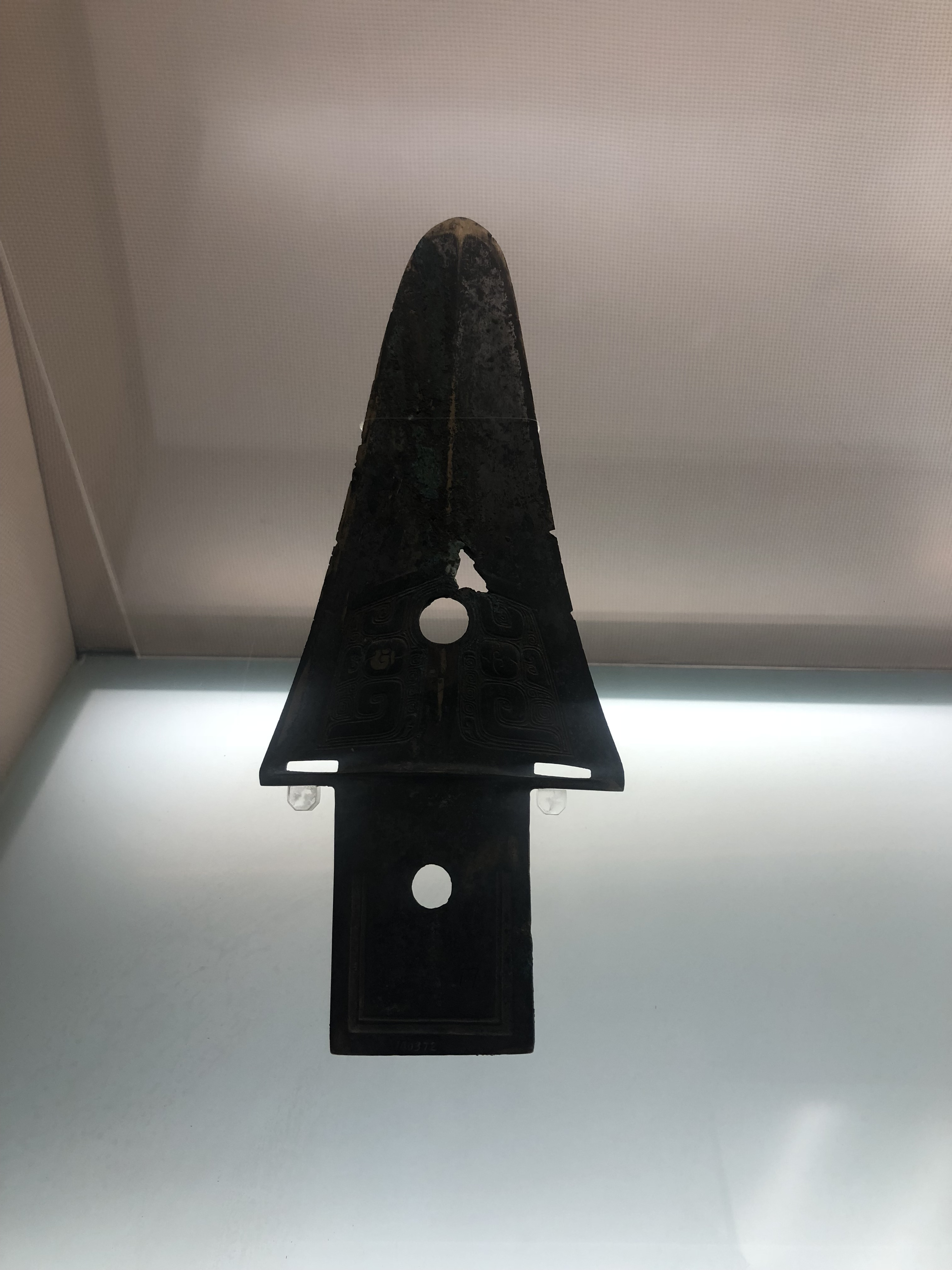

== See also ==
- Ba–Shu Chinese
- Ba–Shu culture
- Hieroglyph
- Sichuanese people
