= Vasu (disambiguation) =

The Vasus are a group of Hindu deities.

Vasu may also refer to:

== Surname ==
- Ayinoor Vasu (born 1930), Indian writer, activist and trade unionist
- E. Vasu (born 1935), Indian writer
- Mona Vasu (born 1982), Indian actress
- P. Vasu (born 1954), Indian film director
- Vinita Vasu, Indian painter

== Given name ==
- Vasu Chanchlani (1952–2014), Canadian businessman
- Vasu Pisharody (born 1943), Indian artist
- Vasu Trivedi, Indian politician

== Others ==
- Vasu (Fiji), Fijian cultural concept related to kinship
- Vasupujya, 12th Jain Tirthankara
- Vasu (film), 2002 Indian film

== See also ==
- Basu, an Indian surname
- Bose (disambiguation), alternative form of Basu
- Bashu (disambiguation)
