= Bashuki =

Bashuki باشوكي
- Village
- Location within Iran
- Coordinates: 35°46′18″N 47°16′41″E
- Country: Iran
- Province: Kurdistan
- County: Bijar
- Bakhsh: Central
- Rural District: Najafabad

Population (2006)
  - Total: 86
- Time zone: UTC+3:30 (IRST)
  - Summer (DST): UTC+4:30 (IRDT)

Bashuki (Persian: باشوكي, also Romanized as Bāshūkī; also known as Bāshūgī, Bīshkeh, Bishukeh, and Bīshūkī) is a village in Najafabad Rural District, in the Central District of Bijar County, Kurdistan province, Iran. At the 2006 census, its population was 86, in 21 families. The village is populated by Kurds.
