= Ba–Shu culture =

Culture of Sichuan and nearby parts of China

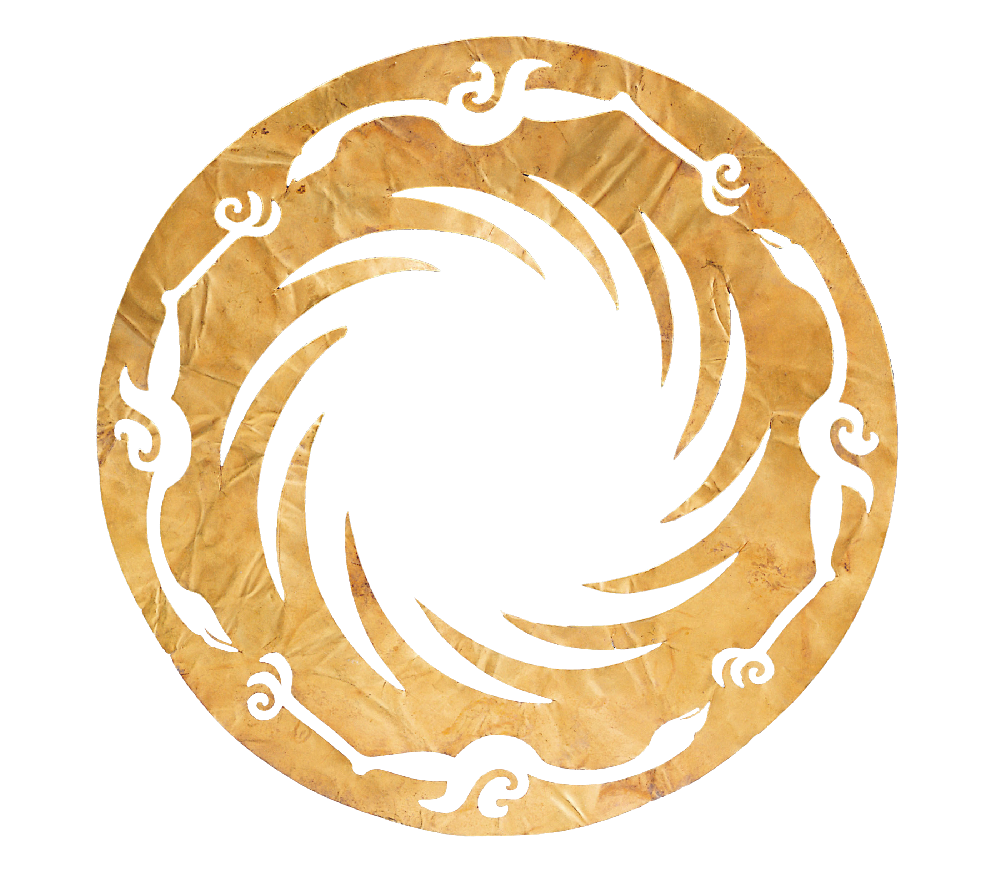
Pattern of the Golden Sun Bird discovered at Jinsha site, a symbol of the Ba–Shu culture and believed to be a totem of the ancient Shu people. It has been designated a symbol for the Chinese culture as a whole by the Chinese government.

Ba-Shu culture (Chinese: 巴蜀文化; pinyin: Bāshǔ wénhuà) refers to a regional culture centered around Sichuan province and Chongqing city, also encompassing parts of Yunnan, Guizhou, southwestern Shaanxi (particularly Hanzhong). Historically centered around the Yangtze River, it emerged as an amalgamation of the cultures of the Shu and Ba kingdoms after their conquest by the state of Qin in 316 BC.

There are some mythical allusions to cultural heroes supposedly connecting Sichuan to the Yellow River area (i.e., heartland of ancient Chinese culture). But historical references to this region are rare before the annexation of Sichuan by the state of Qin in 316 BC, and prior to that date, the ancient annals treat Sichuan as quite marginal, contradicting the myths. The people of Ba and Shu were literate in Old Chinese, in addition to the undeciphered three Ba–Shu scripts.

The discovery of the Shu site of Sanxingdui in 1986, and Jinsha in 2001 places the Ba-Shu culture's age at over three to four millennia old; consequently, it is considered either a related cultural area of ancient China, or one of the cradles of Chinese civilisation and culture by some historians. Ba-Shu culture has continued to the present day and is nowadays famous for aspects such as its cuisine and Sichuan opera.

== Origins ==
=== Shu culture ===
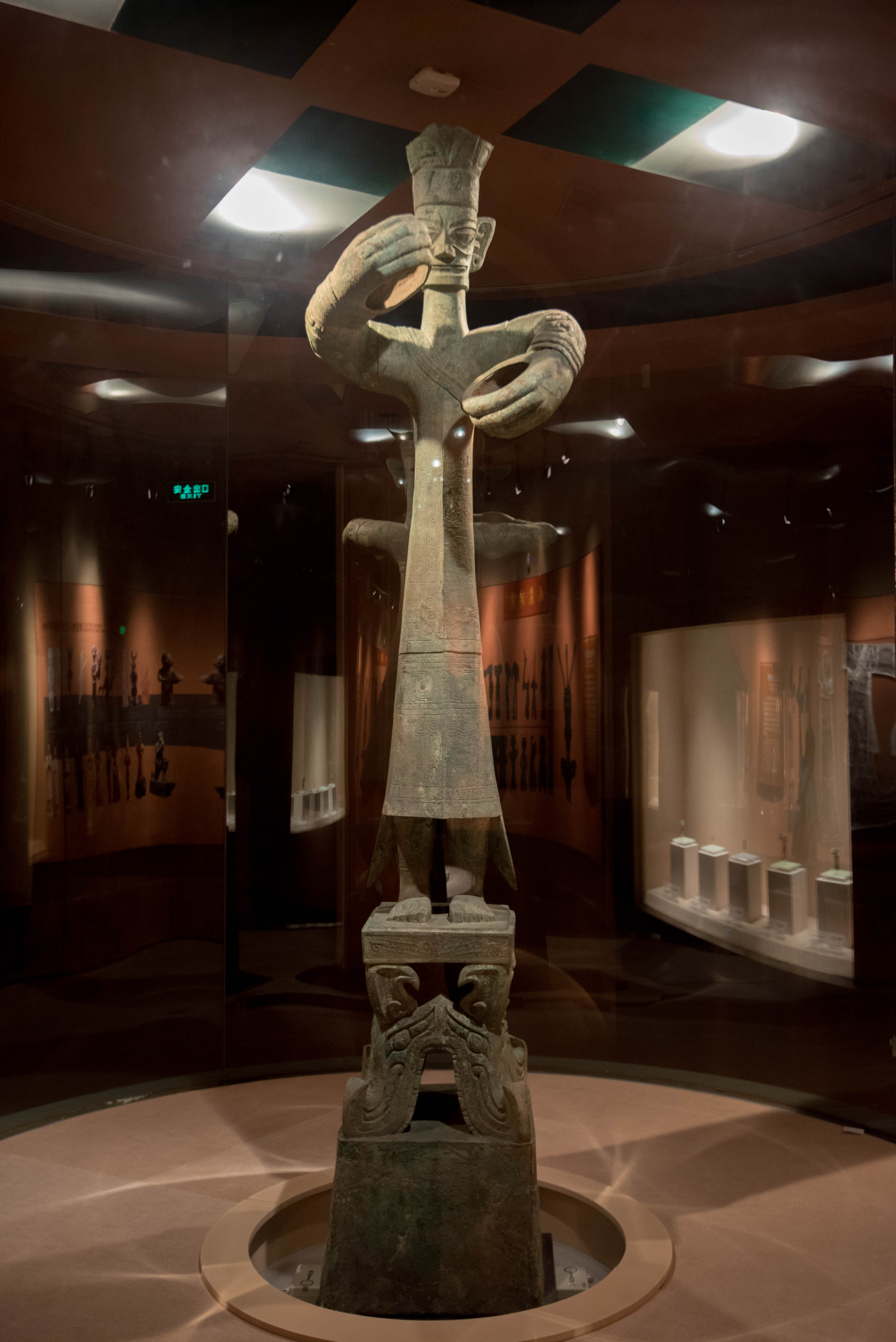
The large bronze figure from Sanxingdui which has been interpreted as a representation of a high priest or a priest-king of ancient Shu.

The kingdom of Shu originated from the Sanxingdui culture and thrived from the 2nd millennium BC until its destruction by the State of Qin in 316 BC, coinciding with the not fully substantiated Xia dynasty in the Zhongyuan region, which lasted a total of one or two millennia. The Shu culture had a rich tradition of metalworking (especially with bronze) and manufactured numerous notable artifacts, hundreds of which were unearthed at sacrificial pits at Sanxingdui and Jinsha; these include bronze statues, heads and masks, several bronze trees (one of which, the Bronze Sacred Tree, has been restored), daggers, hundreds of pieces of pottery, and the Golden Sun Bird. Additionally, the Shu culture is noted for its resistance to external influences, and was more or less unaffected by other nearby cultures until its conquest by the State of Qin in 316 BC.

=== Ba culture ===
Ba culture and the State of Ba were historically centered around the Three Gorges area. The Ba people worshiped the white tiger, which was their totem, and crafted many bronze artifacts based on its form and patterns. They had a rich tradition of performing arts, with distinctive instruments and rituals like the Bayu Dance. However, there is a lack of identifiable artifacts belonging to the Ba culture, as well as knowledge of the culture, as nearly all of them have been mixed with relics of nearby kingdoms, and there is an absence of written records about Ba culture made by its contemporary states or the Shang dynasty.

== Traditional language ==
=== Ancient writing system ===
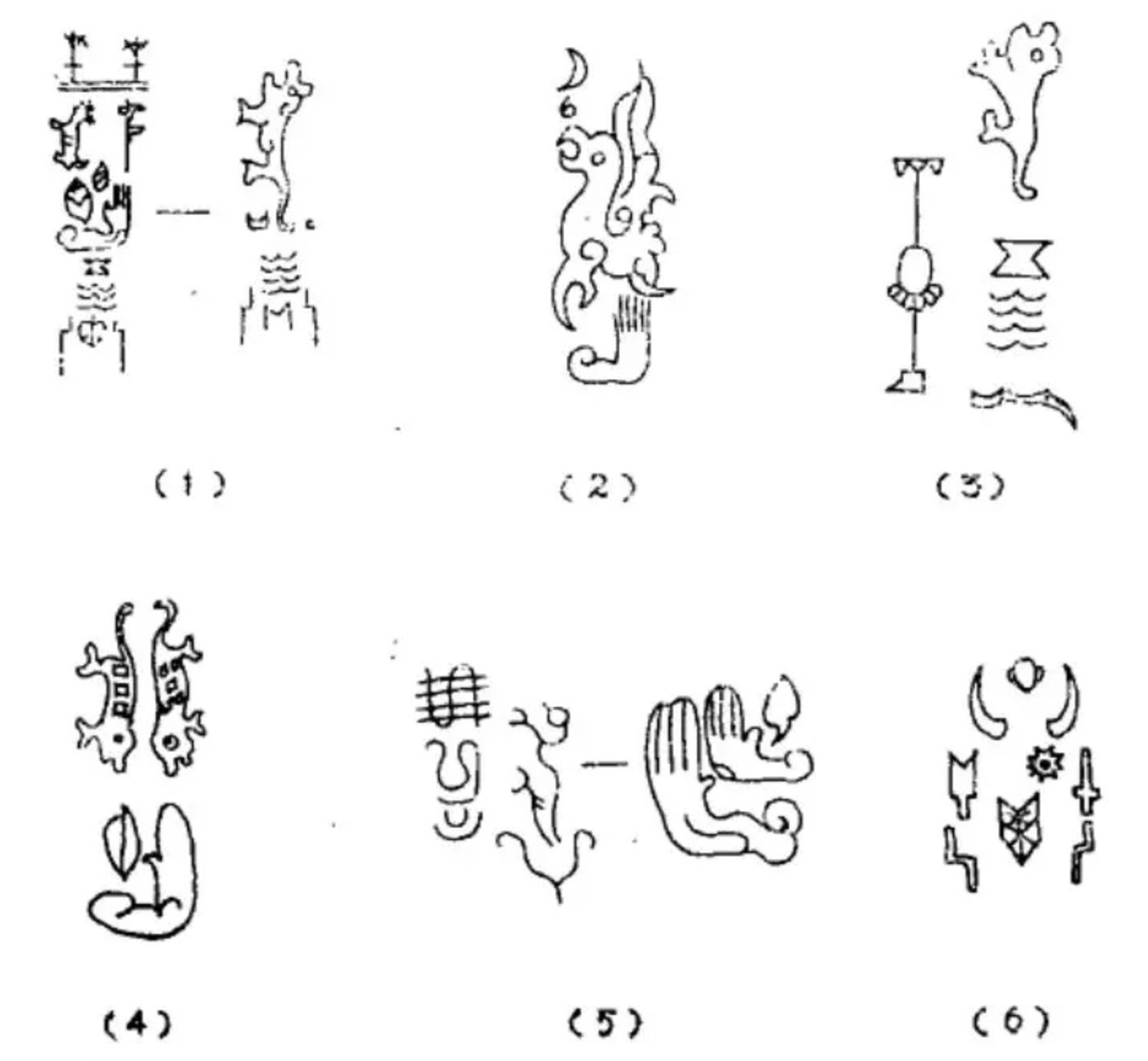
Ba–Shu pictographic scripts

== Visual arts ==
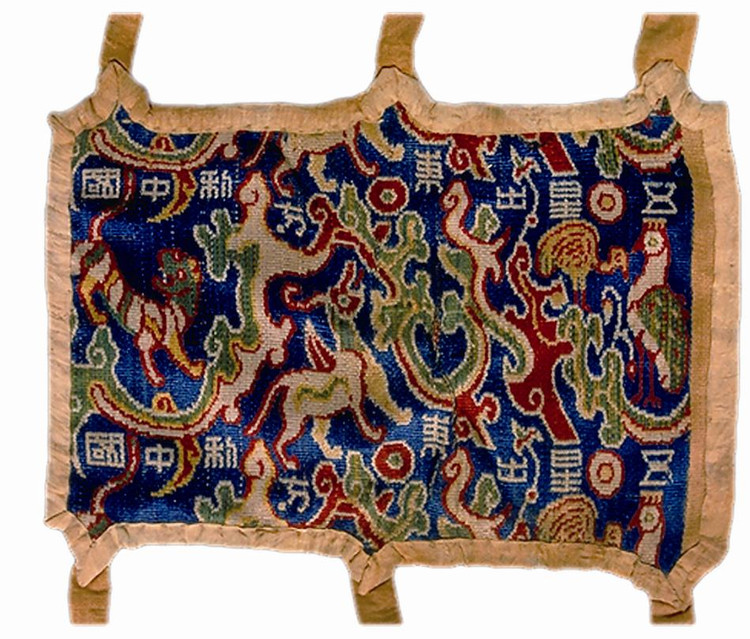
"Five stars" armband, a 3rd-century Sichuan brocade armband

== Cuisine ==
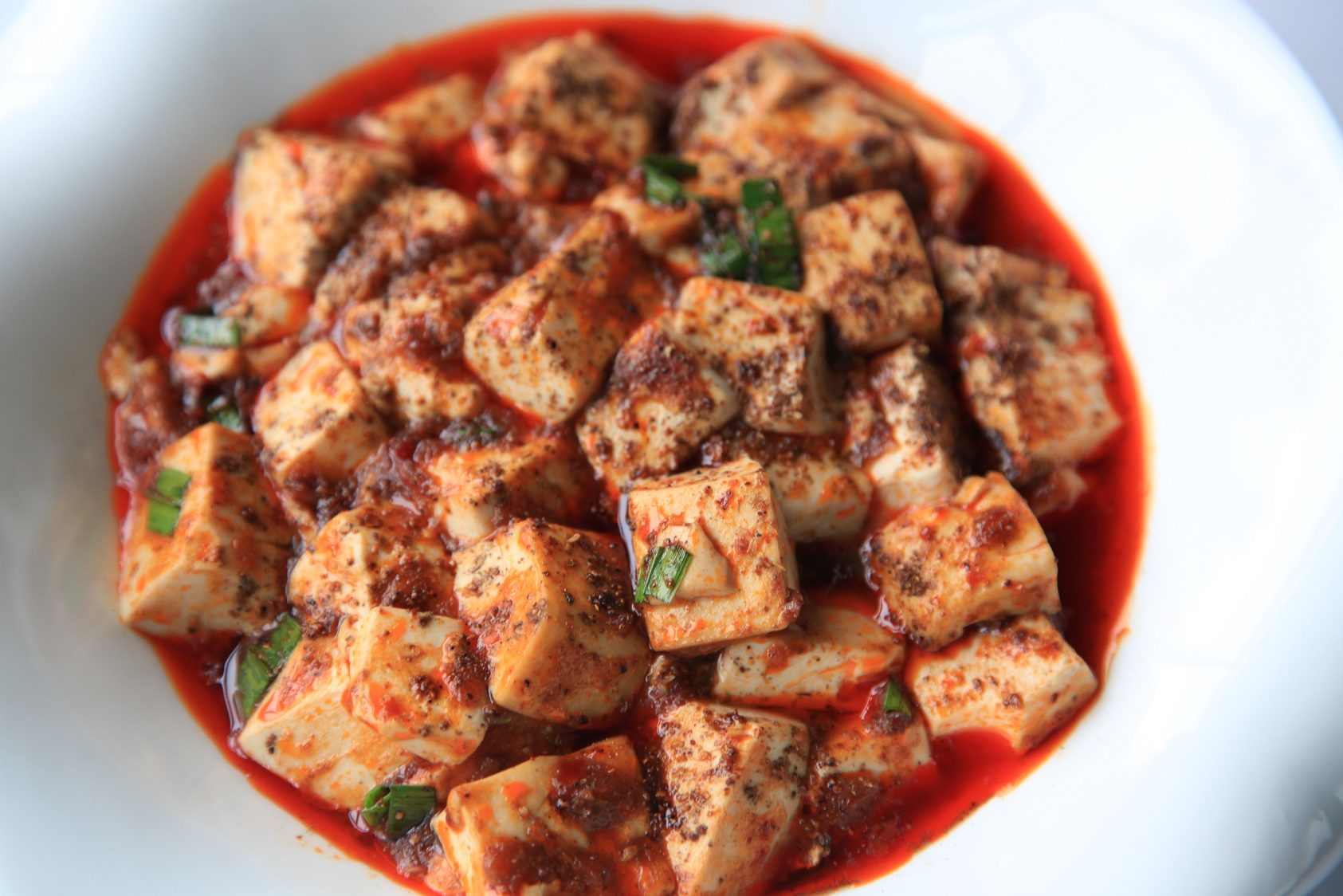
Mapo tofu

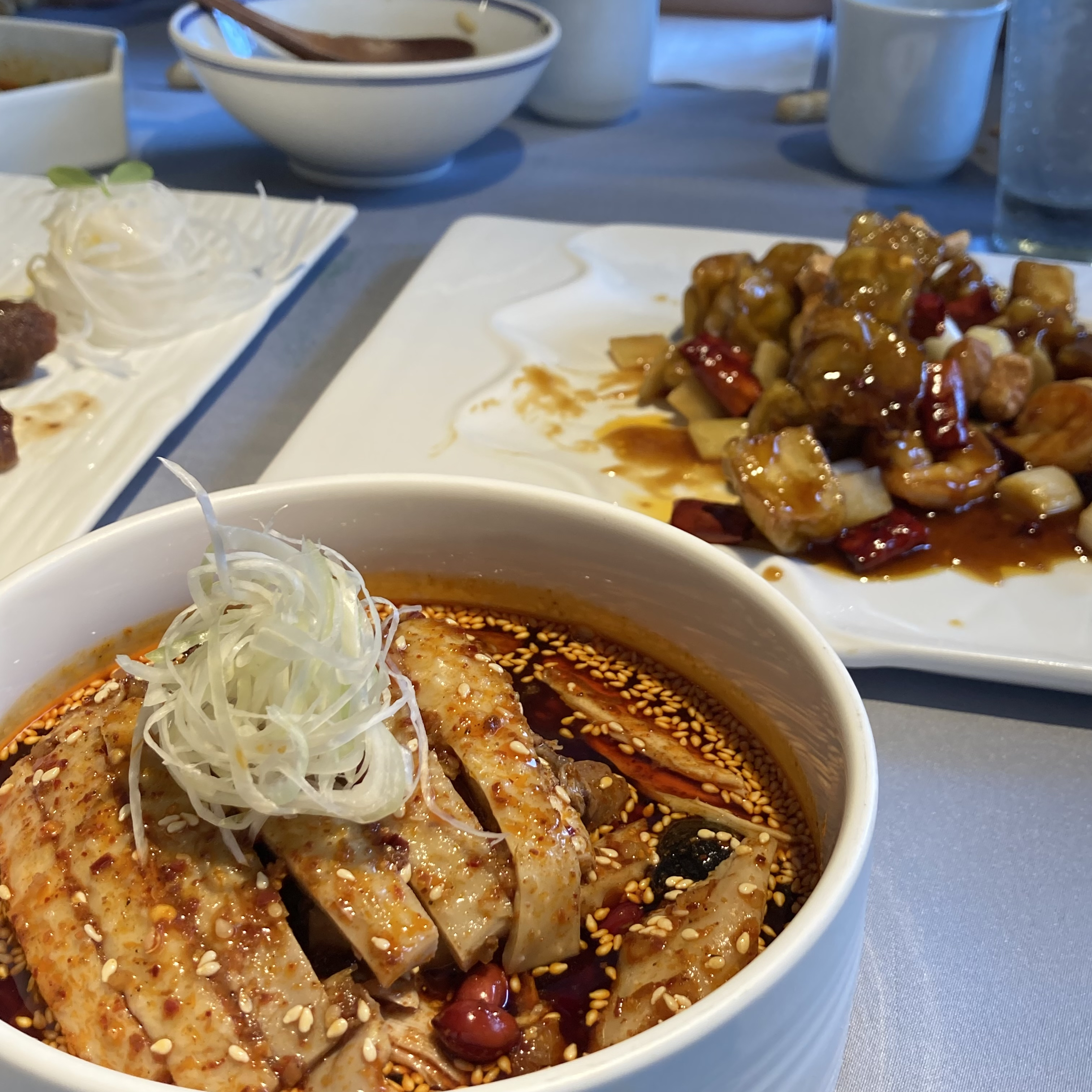
Bon bon chicken

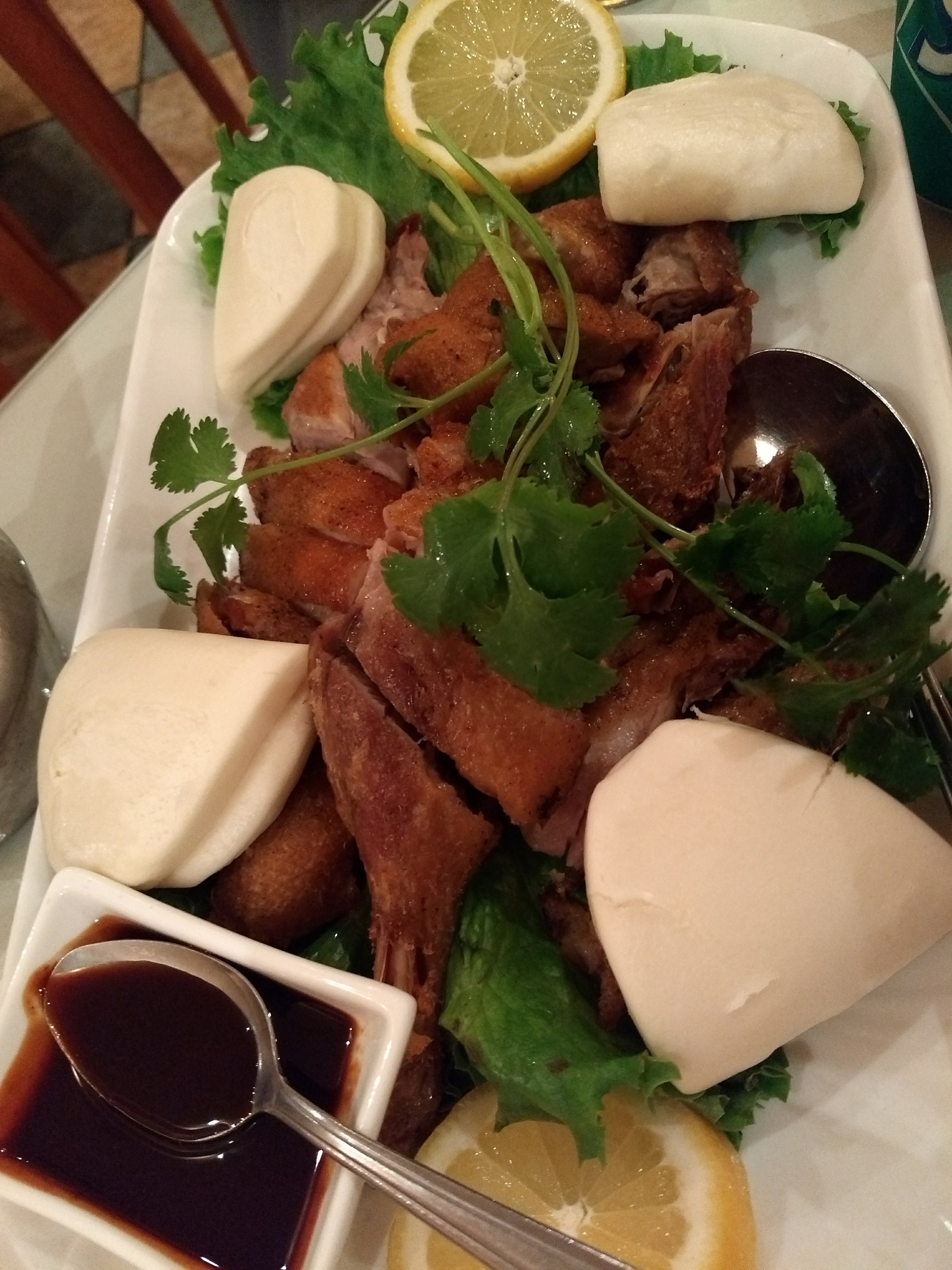
Tea-smoked duck

== Gallery ==
Religious buildings

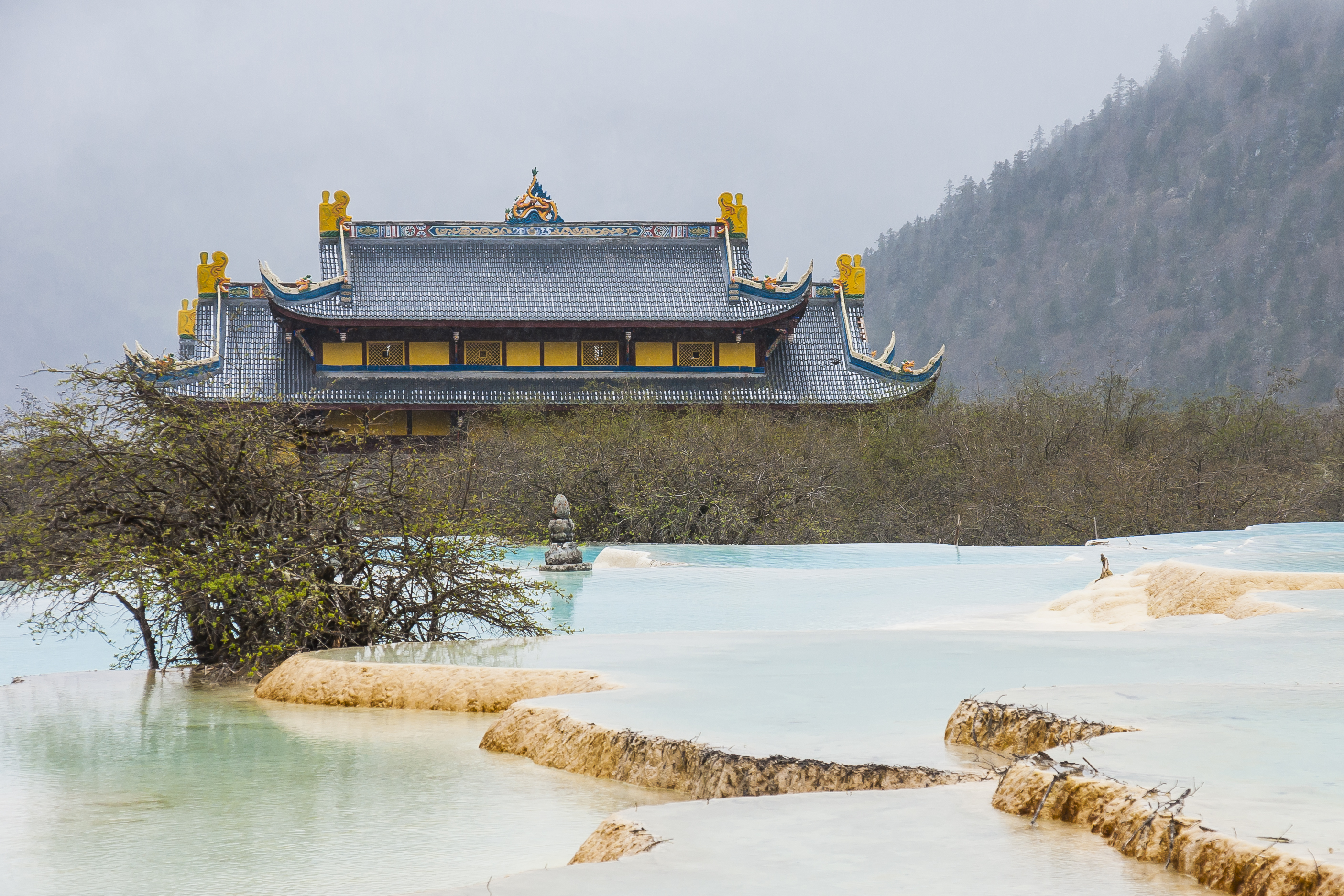
Taoist temple of Huanglong

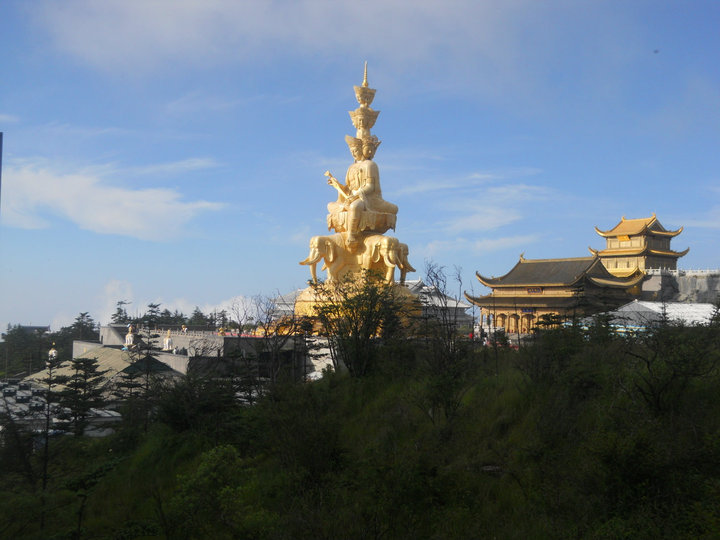
Golden Temple of Mount Emei of the Chinese Buddhist tradition

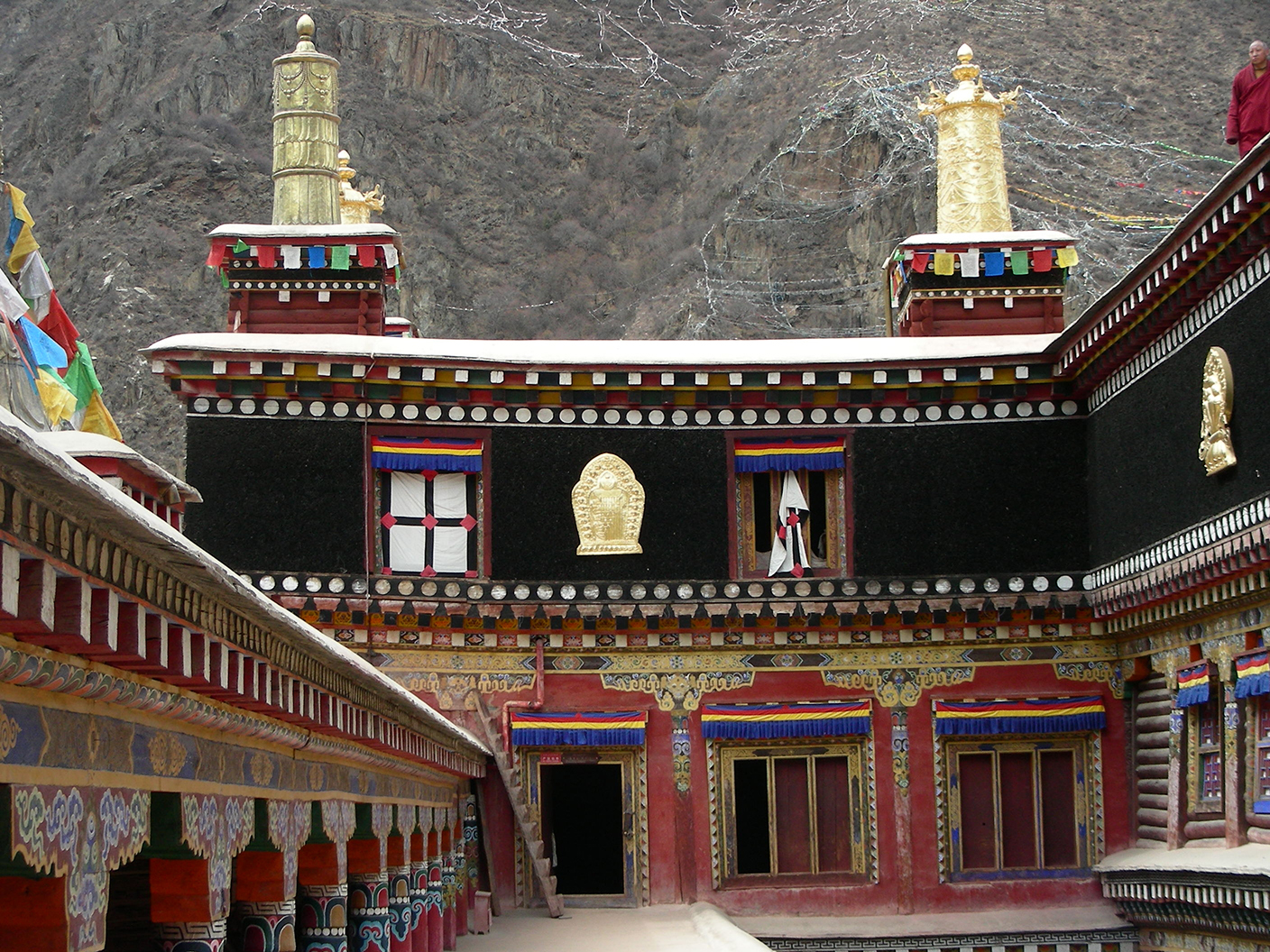
Gonchen Monastery of the Tibetan Buddhist tradition

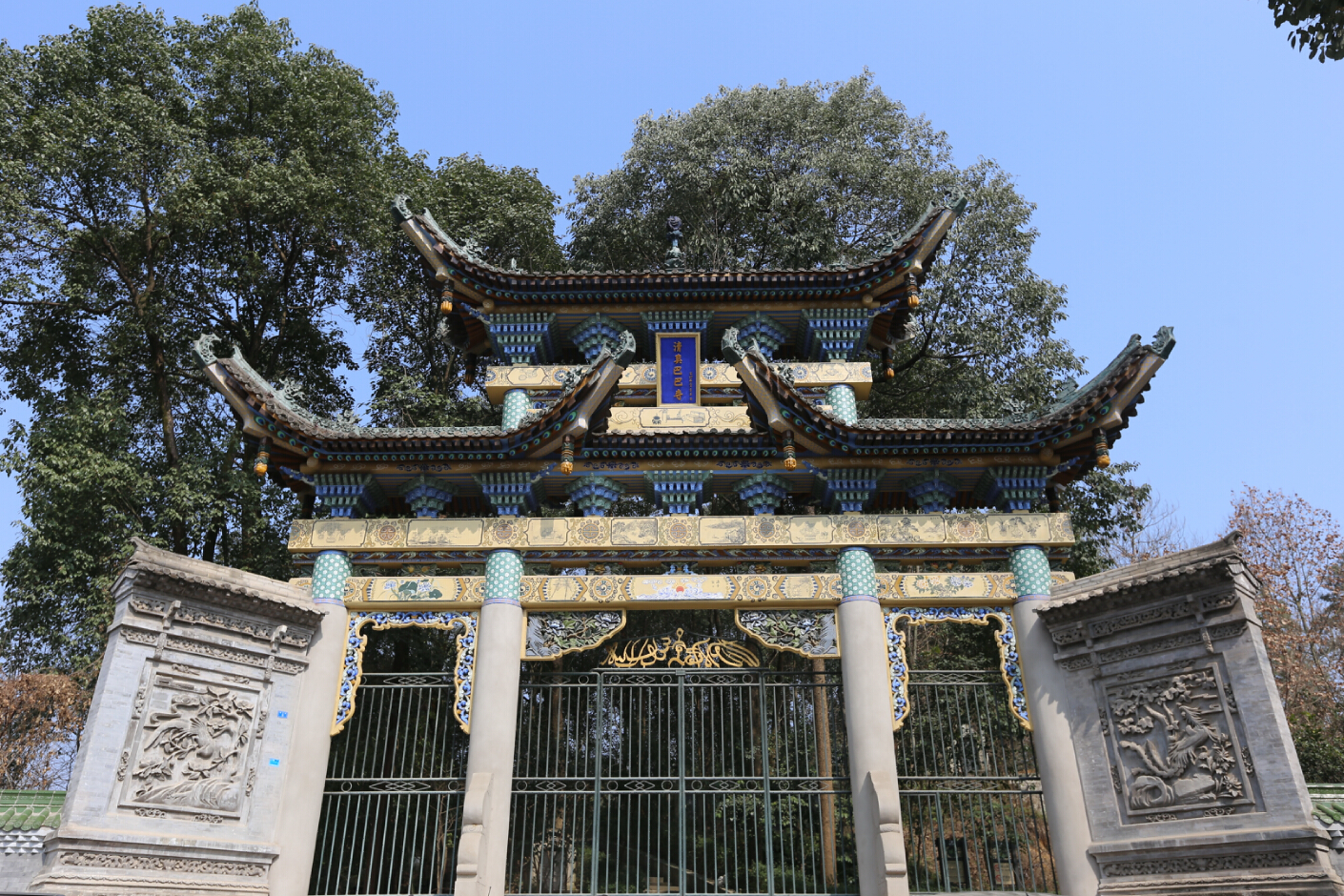
Baba Mosque, a Sufi mosque in Langzhong

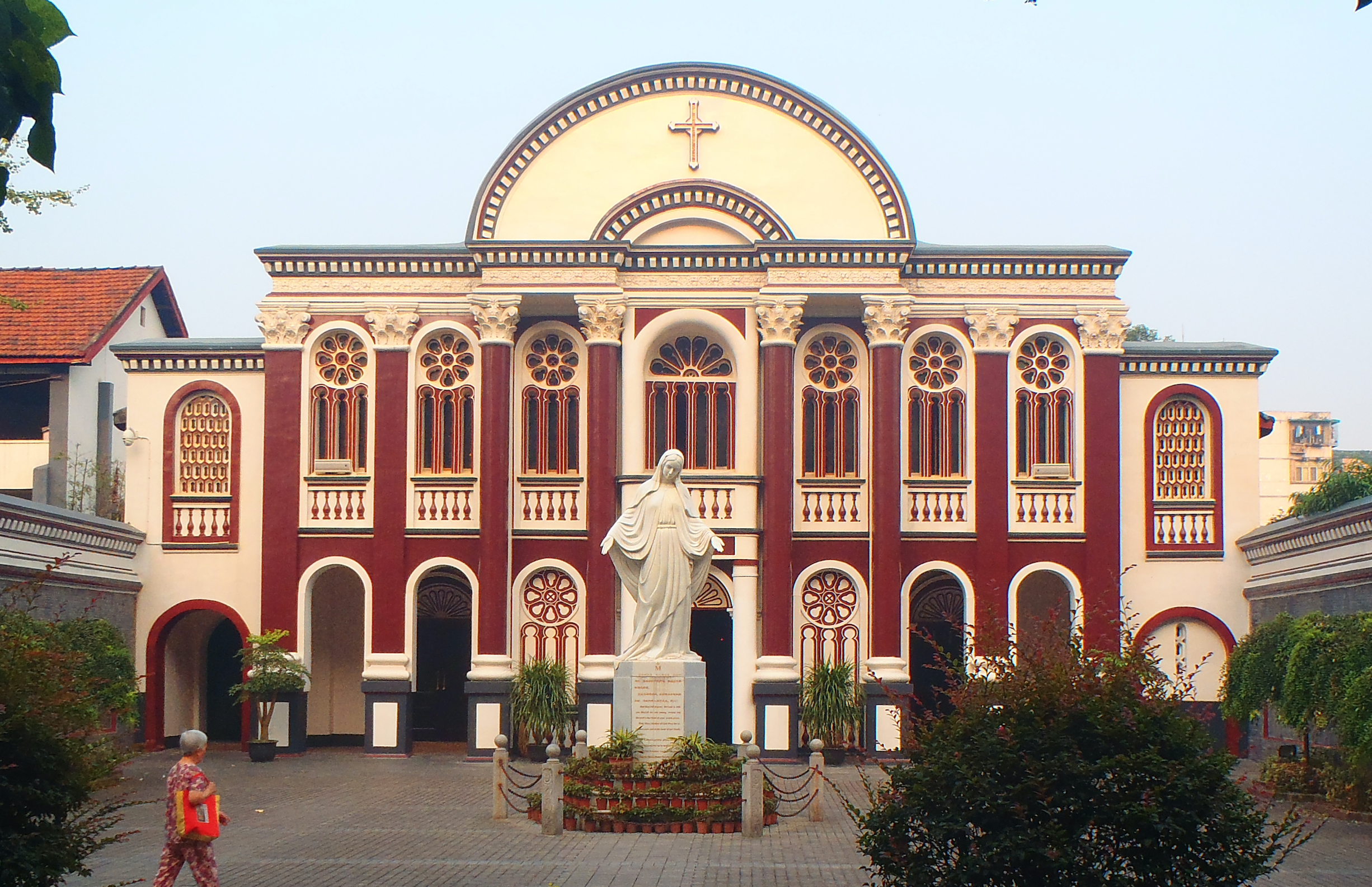
Immaculate Conception Cathedral, Chengdu (Catholic)

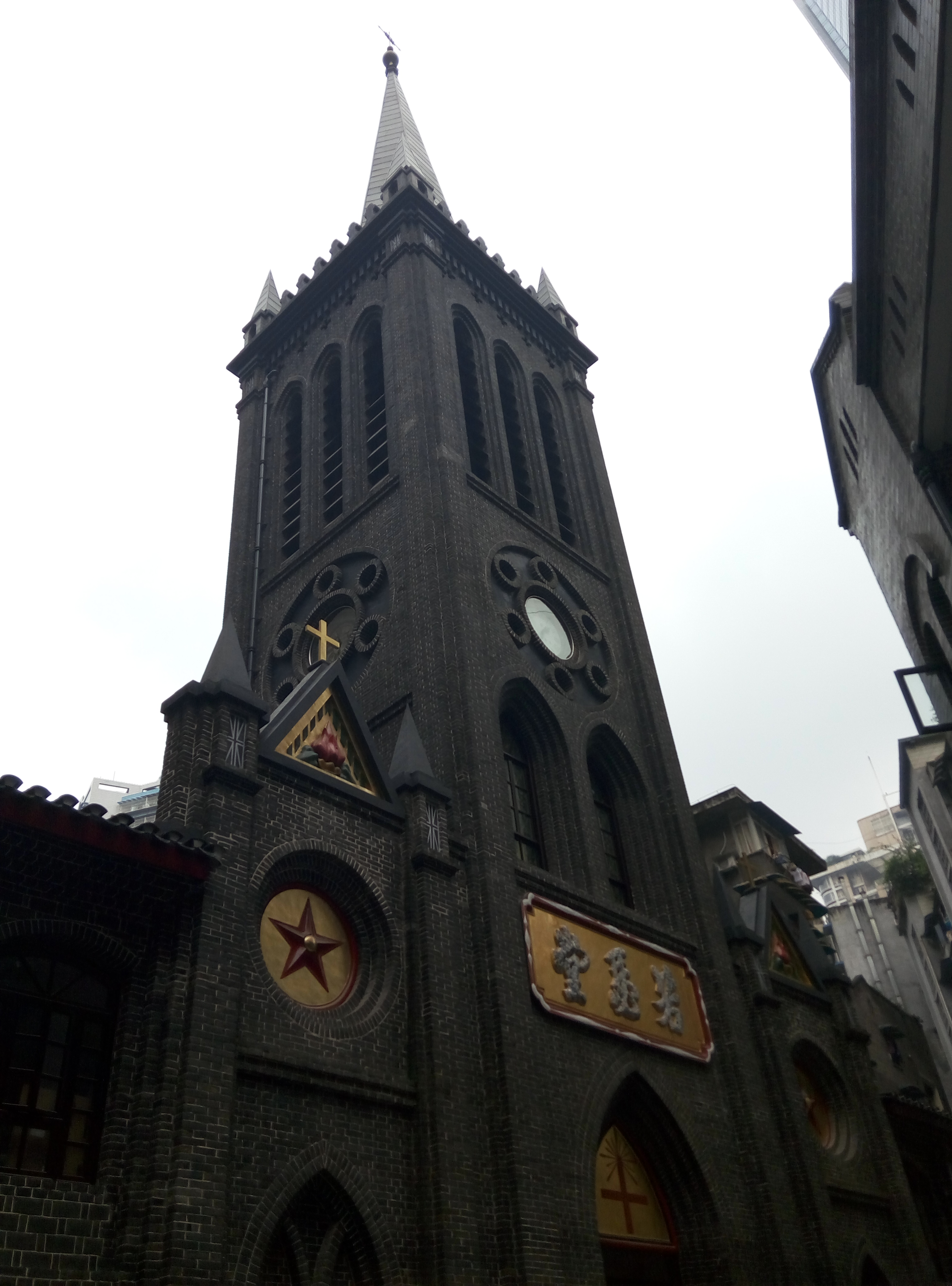
St. Joseph's Cathedral, Chongqing (Catholic)

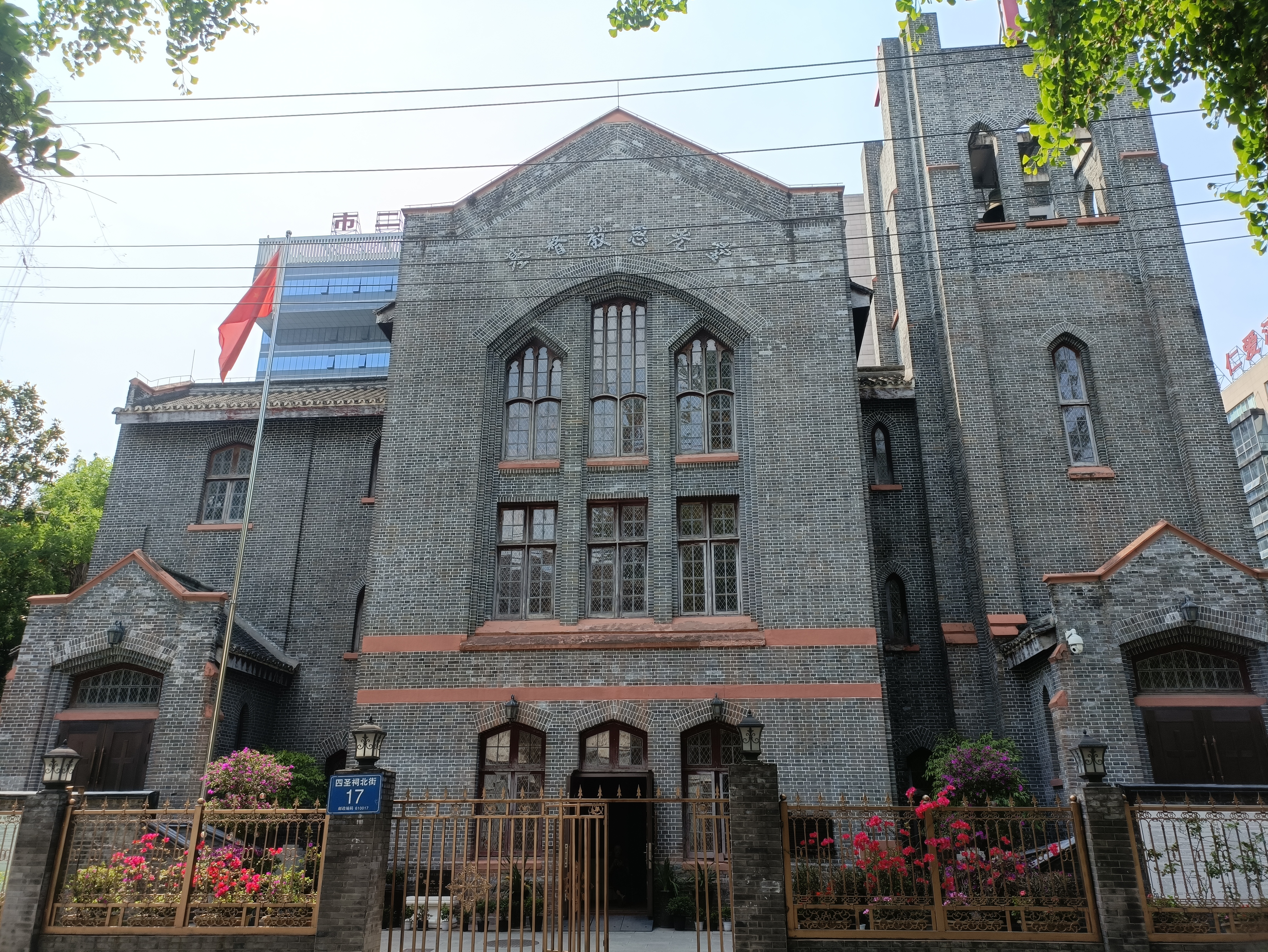
Sï-Shen-Tsï Church (Methodist)

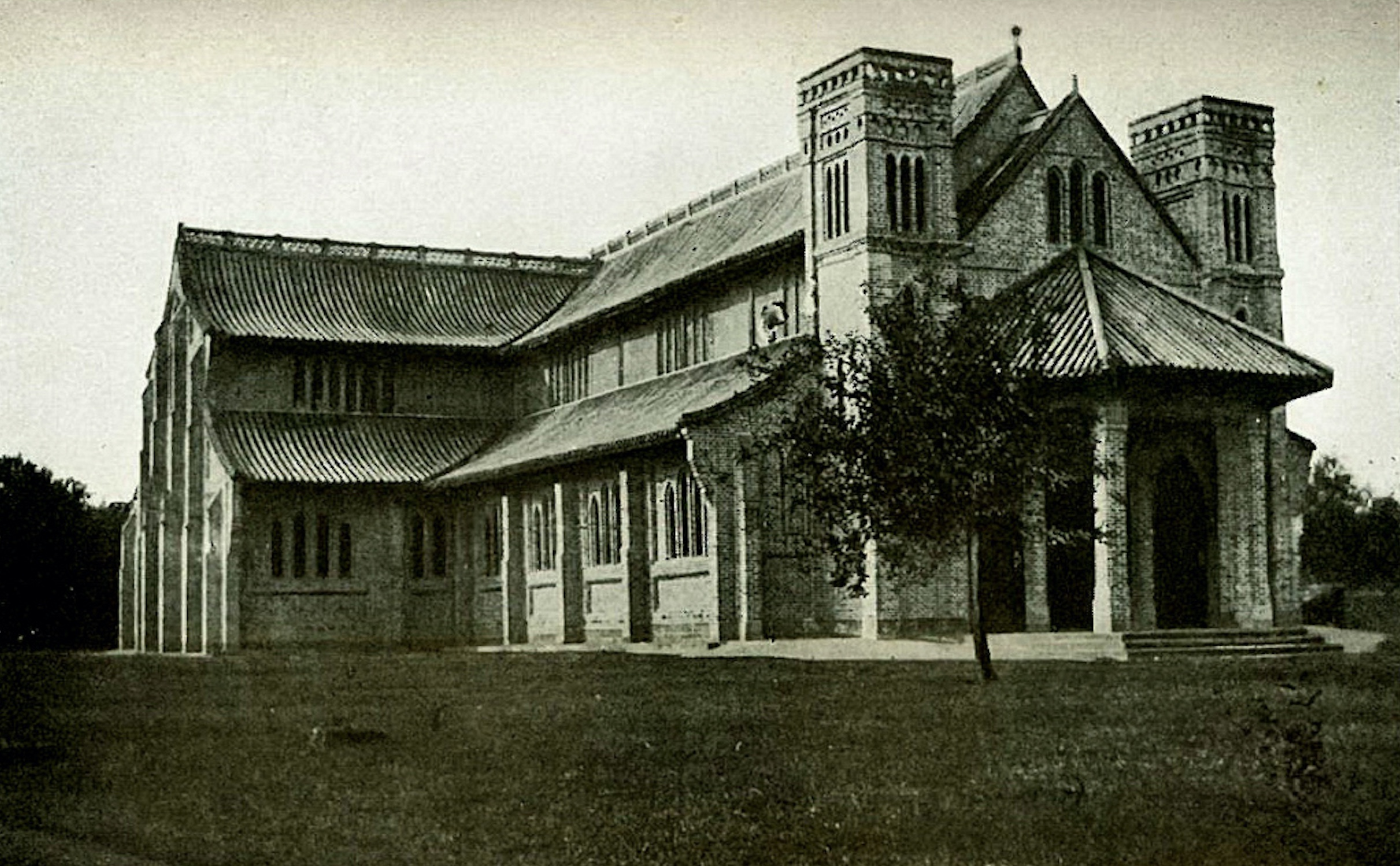
St John's Cathedral, Langzhong (Anglican)

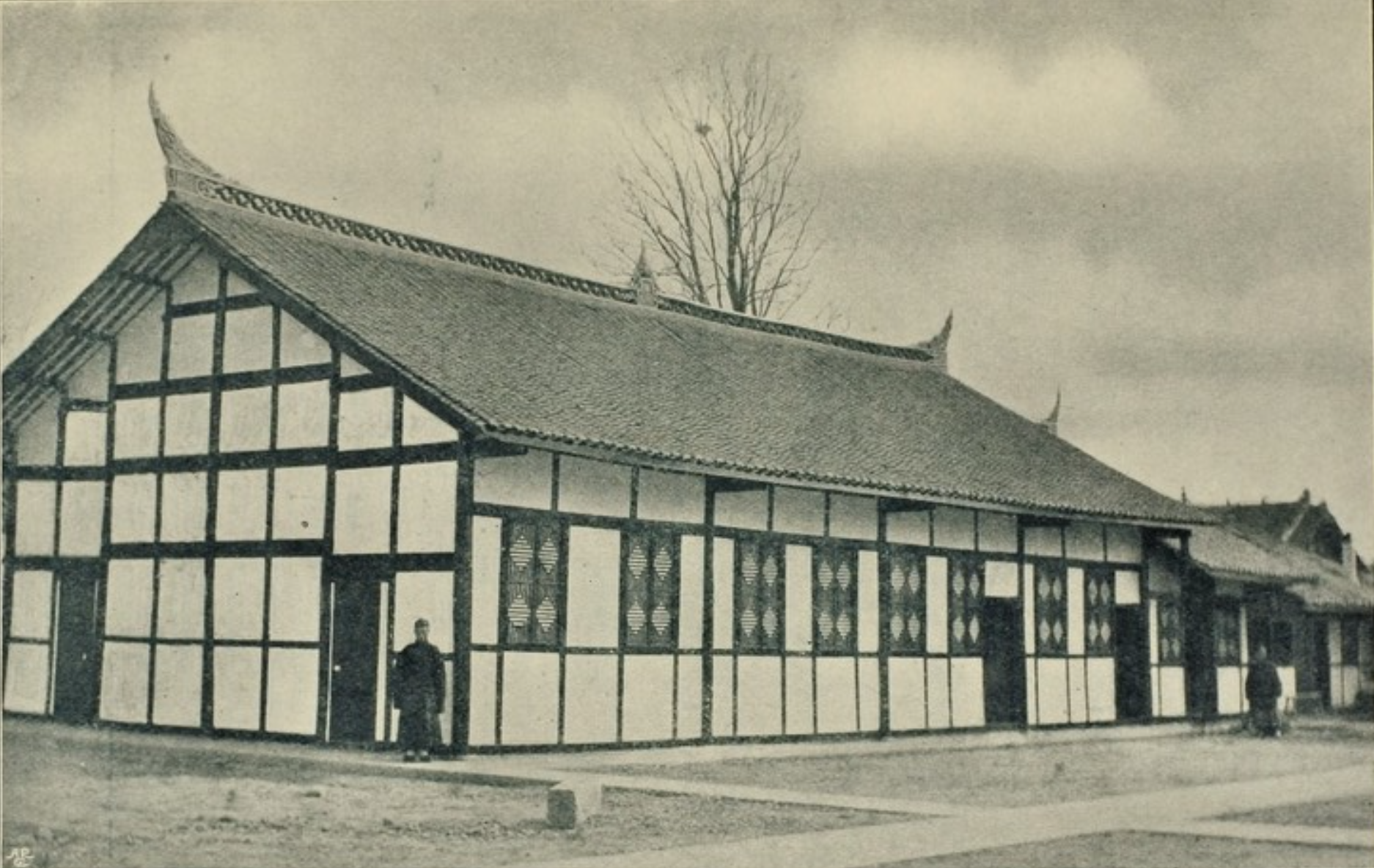
Tongchuan Meeting House built in Western Sichuanese folk style (Quaker)

== See also ==
- Culture of Gansu
- Culture of Qinghai
- Culture of Tibet
- Culture of Yunnan
- Sichuanese people
- Pearl Temple
