= Basu Poribar =

Basu Poribar (lit. 'Basu/Bose family') may refer to these Indian films:

- Basu Paribaar (1952 film), a Bengali film
- Basu Poribar (2019 film), a Bengali film

== See also ==
- Basu, an Indian surname
