= Boson (disambiguation) =

A boson is a particle that has integer spin.

Boson may also refer to:

- John Boson, woodworker
- John Boson (writer) (1655–1730), writer in the Cornish language
- Nicholas Boson (1624–1708), writer in Cornish
- Thomas Boson (1635–1719), writer in Cornish
- Boso of Provence (Boson, c. 841–887), Frankish nobleman and pretender to the throne of Burgundy

== See also ==
- Satyendra Nath Bose, Indian physicist, namesake of the particle
- Bose (disambiguation)
- Bozon (disambiguation)
- Boatswain, bo's'n, bos'n, or bosun
- The Bosonid dynasty, a dynasty of Franks
- Bosön
- Barbara Bosson (1939–2023), American actress
- Bosson (born 1969), Swedish singer-songwriter
