= List of current non-sovereign African monarchs =

This is a list of reigning non-sovereign monarchs in Africa, including traditional rulers and governing constitutional monarchs, but not the kings of Lesotho, Morocco and Eswatini. Each monarch listed below reigns over a legally recognised dominion located internally within a sovereign state, but in most cases possess little or no sovereign governing power themselves. Their titles, however, are recognised by the state. Entries are listed beside their respective dominions, and are grouped by country.

== Background ==
The roles, powers, and influence of non-sovereign monarchs throughout Africa vary greatly depending on the state. In some states, such as Angola, the local king may play an integral role in the local governing council of a region, such is the case with the king of Bailundo, or on a smaller level, such as many of the Fons of Cameroon, they may be seen as leaders or heads of a particular town, settlement, or village. They are often regarded as custodians of tradition and culture, and in some cases, play an important role in local religious activities (such as in Benin, where some of the kings double as heads of Vodun cults and are believed to have spiritual powers).

Their relationship with the national government of which their respective realm sits within can be complex. Particularly influential monarchs are often sought after by local politicians and elected leaders for support, while others have contentious relationships with their national governments. In some cases, the national government has stepped in to curtail the influence of non-sovereign monarchs (such as when Chadian government suspended the powers of the Ouaddai sultan in 2022, or when the emir of Kano was deposed by the regional government).

== List ==
State	Polity	Title	Monarch	Since	House	Succession	Refs
Angola	Bailundo	King/Soma inene	Tchongolola Tchongonga Ekuikui VI	2021		Hereditary and elective	
Angola	Cuito	King	Bingo Bingo			Hereditary	
Angola	Baixa de Cassanje		Dianhenga Aspirante Mjinji Kulaxingo			Hereditary	
Angola	Huambo (Wambu)	King	Artur Moço				
Angola	Lunda-Tchokwe	Mwene	Muatchissengue Wa Tembo / José Estêvão			Hereditary	
Angola	Luvale	Queen	Nhakatole Chilombo Tchissengo	2004	Nhakatole	Hereditary	
Angola	Mbata / Zombo	King	Makitu III	2023	Kizulu	Matrilinear	
Angola	Mbanza Kongo	Coordinator of the Court of Traditional Authorities "Lumbu"	Mfumu Mukongo Afonso Méndes			Hereditary	
Angola	Mbunda	Mwene	Mbandu III Mbandu Lifuti	2008		Hereditary	
Angola	Ndongo	Ngola Kiluanje	Diba Ngola Jungo	2024		Hereditary	
Angola	Nganguela	King	Tchinhama Mwene Vunongue VIII Manuel Ndala	2019		Hereditary	
Angola	Ombada yo Mungo	King	Zeferino Satona				
Angola	Ombala ya Nalueque	King	Mário Satipamba				
Angola	Viye	oSoma	Afonso Viti			Hereditary and elective	
Benin	Abomey (Dahomey) (Note: Historically known as Dahomey, or Danhome.)	Ahosu	Dada Dèwènondè Gbéhanzin (Note: Real name Georges Collinet Béhanzin)	22 January 2022	Aladaxonou (Note: A Fon dynasty.)	Hereditary and elective	
Benin	Abomey-Calavi	King	Kpôton Avoumbè Gbesso Allodji III				
Benin	Ahouannonzoun	King	Abmomansoatin Kponan				
Benin	Akassato	King	Zounfon				
Benin	Ardra	Ahosu	Kpodégbé Djigla	2 December 1992	Agasuvi	Hereditary	
Benin	Agonlin	King/Dada	Dada Agonlinhossou Yèto Kandji	24 February 1993	Yèto		
Benin	Avrankou	King/Dada	Latchèholou Guidimadjegbé (Note: Also known as Latchè Holou Guidimadégbé.)				
Benin	Azovè	King	Aklamakou-Zokou (Note: Also known as Aklan Makouzokou.)				
Benin	Banikoara	King	Nasounon				
Benin	Cana	King/Dada	Langanfin Glélé Aïhotogbé (Note: Also known as Aïhotogbé Langanfin Glèlè.)				
Benin	Comè	King	Togbé Akati II Djidjilévo				
Benin	Dahé	King/Dada	Dada Awiyan Kokpon Houdegbe				
Benin	Dassa	Oba	Egbakotan II		Dassa (Note: A Yoruba dynasty.)	Hereditary	
Benin	Djougou	King	Kpétoni Koda VI				
Benin	Dogbo	King	Towanou II				
Benin	Ganvié	King	Houéton Ahoumbè				
Benin	Guin ethnic group in Benin	Guin Fiogan	Nii Kouété Nicoué Kpatakpatakou II	4 October 2020			
Benin	Houégbo	King	Gbedonouzo Atchudji				
Benin	Houéyogbé	King	Agassa Adanyroh Guèdèhounguè				
Benin	Karimama	Ango	Amadou	14 April 2000	Dandaoudou	Hereditary	
Benin	Kèrè	Oba	Ariy				
Benin	Ketu	Oba	Alaro Alade-Ife	17 December 2005	Alaketu	Hereditary	
Benin	Kika	King	Kika Toko Salifou Kouma (Note: Also known as Gangorosuambou.)				
Benin	Kinto and the Houézènou people	King	Adjiwatonou Yèwa Hondogbè Kpèdo III				
Benin	Kpanhouingnan	King	Aglimasse				
Benin	Kpomassè	King	Olota				
Benin	Kouandé	Bangana	Sourou III	28 September 2004	Bangana (Note: A sept of the Borgou dynasty of the Bariba. The kings of Nikki are historically also of Boussa origin.)	Hereditary and elective	
Benin	Manigri	King	Djaboutouboutou				
Benin	N'Dali	King	Daari Sounon Swanrou				
Benin	Naogon	King	Dah Gandaho Kini Dégbé				
Benin	Natitingou	King	Yane Sotima				
Benin	Nikki	Sinaboko	Chabi Naina III	2014	Sinaboko	Hereditary and elective	
Benin	Ouémé Valley	King	Signon Oba Adékiyiloumon				
Benin	Ouidah	King	Mito-Daho Kpassenon		Kpassè	Hereditary	
Benin	Paouingnan	King	Gbèdégbé Adda Sèhoto IIII				
Benin	Parakou	King	Akpaki Boukou Kinnin II (Note: The previous king of Parakou, the Akpaki Dagbara II, died in 2004, and the throne remained vacant for almost eight years. Two candidates, one designated by the Baparapé chief, the other by chief of Gbégourou, both customarily empowered to appoint the successor of a deceased king, had been battling for the throne. In October 2008, the traditional council was divided in its deciding election. The candidates, both of the Bourou dynasty, are N'Gobi Barthélémy and Yossounon Gobi.)	12 September 2012	Kobourou (Note: A sept of the Borgou dynasty. Succession is traditionally alternated between the Akpaki dynasty of the Bariba, and the Bourou dynasty of the Yoruba.)	Hereditary and elective	
Benin	Péhunco	Sinagonrigui	Kpéï Sourou (Note: Formerly known as Kora Zaki Lafia.)	13 August 2004	Sinagonrigui	Hereditary	
Benin	Porto-Novo (Note: There are two kings recognised in Porto-Novo. They rule simultaneously.)	Ahosu	Toffa IX Gbêzé Ayontinmè (Note: Name is also written as Agnontinmè, Ayintinmè, or De-Gbezé Ayontinmé Toffa IX); Kpodagba Lokpon VIII		Agasuvi	Hereditary	
Benin	Savé	Oba	Adetutu Akinmou Akikenju VI (Note: Also styled as Onisabe within the community.)		Onisabe	Hereditary	
Benin	Savalou	King	Dada Ganfon Gbaguidi XV				
Benin	Tori-Bossito	King	Odjaka Kinidégbé Gbozèkpa Gbèna				
Benin	Wèmè-Tosso	King	Tossoholou Zoundjè Wandji Ganmasizo Toli Yélian				
Benin	Zinvié Yevié	King	Adjihinto				
Botswana (Note: The rulers of the eight paramount chiefdoms of the Tswana in Botswana hold the eight permanent seats in the country's Ntlo ya Dikgosi. The remainder of seats are held by chiefs from minority Tswana tribes, such as the Birwa, Kalaka, Kgalagadi, Sarwa, and Tswapong. These representatives are either elected or appointed for five-year terms.)	Bakgatla	Kgosikgolo	Kgafela II (Note: Also known as Kgafela Kgafela.)	20 September 2008	Masilo	Hereditary	
Botswana	Bakwêna	Kgosikgolo	Kgari III (Note: Also known as Kgari a Bonewamang Sechele.)	17 August 2002 (Note: Sworn in the House of Chiefs in March 2002.)	Masilo	Hereditary	
Botswana	Balete	Kgosigadi	Mosadi (Note: Also known as Mosadi Muriel Seboko a Mokgôsi.)	7 January 2002 (Note: Elected as paramount chief in December 2001. She officially took up duties on 7 January, and was sworn in the House of Chiefs on 28 February 2002. She was formally enthroned on 30 August 2003.)	Badimo	Hereditary	
Botswana	Bamangwato	Kgosikgolo	Ian Khama (Note: Also known as Seretse Khama Ian Khama, or Ian a Sêrêtsê. He was also the fourth head of state of Botswana.)	5 May 1979	Masilo	Hereditary	
Botswana	Bangwaketse	Kgosikgolo	Malope II a Gaseitsiwe (Note: Also known as Malope Gaseitsiwe.)	5 August 2010 (Note: Has not yet been formally installed.)	Masilo	Hereditary	
Botswana	Barolong	Kgosikgolo	Lotlamoreng II (Note: Also known as Lotlamoreng Montshiwa, or Lotlaamoreng Montshioa.)	23 February 2002 (Note: Elected as paramount chief in June 2001. Sworn in the House of Chiefs on 28 February 2002.)	Morolong	Hereditary	
Botswana	Batawana	Kgosigadi	Kealitile (Note: Kealitile Moremi took over as paramount chief from her brother Tawana II, who resigned in August 2003 in order to follow a career in politics. At present, she is only considered regent, and has not been formally enthroned.)	28 January 2004	Masilo	Hereditary	
Botswana	Batlôkwa	Kgosikgolo	Puso Gaborone	30 May 2006 (Note: Elected as paramount chief on 18 March 2006. Coronation took place on 18 August 2007.)	Gaborone	Hereditary	
Burkina Faso	Boussouma	Naaba	Sigri	10 August 2019		Hereditary	
Burkina Faso	Diébougou	King	Quattara Sié Félix	2007			
Burkina Faso	Djibo	Emir	unknown (last held by Boubacari Dicko)				
Burkina Faso	Fada N'gourma (Gulmu)	King	Untaamba (Note: The throne is disputed between two candidates.); Hampanli			Elective	
Burkina Faso	Liptako (Note: Liptako contains portions of Burkina Faso, Mali, and Niger. It is unclear how the Emirs authority extends across these areas.)	Emir	Ousmane Amirou Dicko				
Burkina Faso	Obiré	King	Gan				
Burkina Faso	Rissiam	Naaba	Koanga				
Burkina Faso	Tangzougou (Gourcy)	Naaba	Baongo de Gourcy	27 August 2011			
Burkina Faso	Tenkodogo (Zougrantenga)	Naaba	Guiguem-Pollé (Djiguampole)	2016			
Burkina Faso	Wogodogo (Ouagadougou)	Mogho Naba	Baongo II	1983		Hereditary	
Burkina Faso	Yagha	Emir	Boureima Ly				
Burkina Faso	Yatenga	Naaba	Kiiba				
Burundi	Burundi	Mwami	vacant		Ntwero	Hereditary	
Cameroon	Adié	Chief	William Ndong Tchombè				
Cameroon	Bafaw and Kumba	Nfon/Paramount chief	Nfon Mukete Ekoko IV				
Cameroon	Bafut	Fon	Abumbi II				
Cameroon	Bali Nyonga	Fon	Dr. Doh Ganyonga III				
Cameroon	Bamoun	Nfon/King/Sultan	Mouhamed Nabil Nfonrifoum Mbombo Njoya	10 October 2021		Hereditary	
Cameroon	Bamoungoum	Chief	Moumbe Fotso Mitterand				
Cameroon	Bana	Fon	Sikam Happi V				
Cameroon	Bandjoun	Chief	Honoré Djomo Kamga				
Cameroon	Bangangté	King/Chief	Nji Monluh Seidou Pokam				
Cameroon	Bangoua	Chief	Julio Djampou Tchatchouang				
Cameroon	Banyo	Lamido	Banyo Mohaman Gabdo Yaya				
Cameroon	Baya	Chief	Mbele Banga				
Cameroon	Bogo	Lamido	Yerima Bello Hamadou	August 2022			
Cameroon	Dibombari	Traditional chief	Toto Bekombo Théodore Chef				
Cameroon	Ebessep	Chef supérieur	Grégoire Langoul				
Cameroon	Edinding	Chief	Tsala Ndjomo Guy				
Cameroon	Eséka	Chief	Gabriel Mayi Matip				
Cameroon	Fontem	Fon	Asabaton Fontem Njifua				
Cameroon	Garoua	Lamido	Ibrahim El Rachidine				
Cameroon	Guirvidig	Chief	Ampou Agourda				
Cameroon	Kalfou	Chief	Yerima Hamadou Tomboutou				
Cameroon	Kom	Fon	Clement Ndzi II				
Cameroon	Logone-Birni	Sultan	Mahamat Bahar Marouf				
Cameroon	Maka-Bebend	Chief	Bertrand Effoudou				
Cameroon	Maka-Mboang	Chief	Jean-Claude Balla				
Cameroon	Mandara	Sultan	Hamidu Umar	18 March 1942		Hereditary	
Cameroon	Mankon	Fon	Asaah Fru Angwafor IV	7 June 2022			
Cameroon	Matakam-Sud	Lamido	Djeguele Zogue				
Cameroon	Meiganga	Lamido	Moussa Sabo				
Cameroon	Maroua	Lamido	Abdoulaye Yérima Bakary	16 September 2022			
Cameroon	Mogode	Lamido	Alhadji Isse Tize				
Cameroon	Mokolo	Lamido	Yacouba Mohamadou Mourtalla				
Cameroon	Mvog-Nama I	Chef supérieur	Jean Marie Mama	7 June 2007			
Cameroon	Ndog-Bea-Nord	Chief	Louis Mbem	4 May 2006			
Cameroon	Ndoukoula	Chief	Ayang Luc				
Cameroon	Ngaoundéré	Lamido	Mohamadou Hayatou Issa				
Cameroon	Nso	Fon	Sehm Mbinglo II				
Cameroon	Omvang-Sekonda	Chief	Ze Nguélé René				
Cameroon	Rey Bouba	Lamido	Abdoulaye				
Cameroon	Sanaga	Chef supérieur	Mveimani Sombo Amba				
Cameroon	Sawa and Bell	King	Jean Yves Eboumbou				
Cameroon	Tibati	Lamido	Mohamadou Hadi Barkindo	17 June 2023			
Cameroon	Tignère	Lamido	Yerima Baba Daiïrou				
Cameroon	Widikum	Fon	Fongum Gorji Dinka				
Cameroon	Yagoua	Lamido	Ahmadou Dahirou	17 September 2020		Elective	
Second degree chiefdoms	Abuh	Fon	Clement Fonkwah Mbeng				
Second degree chiefdoms	Anyajua	Fon	Nsom Johnson Chongsi				
Second degree chiefdoms	Baba I	Fon	Fue Nghaper II	8 May 2023			
Second degree chiefdoms	Babungo	Fon	Ndofoa Zofoa III				
Second degree chiefdoms	Bafmeng	Fon	Francis Aneng				
Second degree chiefdoms	Bafoussam	Chef supérieur	Njitack Ngompe Pelé				
Second degree chiefdoms	Baleveng	Chef supérieur	Guemgni Gaston				
Second degree chiefdoms	Bamendjinda	Chef supérieur	Tanefo Jean Marie				
Second degree chiefdoms	Bamendou	King	Gabriel Tsidie				
Second degree chiefdoms	Bamendjou	King/Fo'o	Jean-Rameau Sokoudjou				
Second degree chiefdoms	Batoufam	Chief	Nayang Toukam Innocent				
Second degree chiefdoms	Bazou	King	Vincent Tchoua Kemajou de Bazou				
Second degree chiefdoms	Belo	Fon	Peter Ndong Abang				
Second degree chiefdoms	Berabe	Fon	Emmanuel Bami				
Second degree chiefdoms	Binka	Fon	Nfor Samuel Hombome				
Second degree chiefdoms	Binshua	Fon	Edmund Kimbi	25 March 2012			
Second degree chiefdoms	Buku	Fon	Lenge Joseph Eku				
Second degree chiefdoms	Bum	Fon	Kwanga Peter Yai				
Second degree chiefdoms	Dschang	Fon	Ralph Mehitang				
Second degree chiefdoms	Fundong	Fon	Diang Zacheus				
Second degree chiefdoms	Kiluun	Fon	Njoyir II				
Second degree chiefdoms	Kungi	Fon	Yaya Musa Gamje Budi	2007			
Second degree chiefdoms	Mbem	Fon	Samuel Ngwim Ngabum				
Second degree chiefdoms	Mbessa	Fon	Njong Gilbert II				
Second degree chiefdoms	Mbiame	Fon	Nwe II				
Second degree chiefdoms	Mbot	Fon	Shey Barnabas Mbunwe II				
Second degree chiefdoms	Mfe	Fon	Chepnda Ronald	2022			
Second degree chiefdoms	Ndu	Fon	Nfor Nformi				
Second degree chiefdoms	Njinikom	Fon	Ngeh Francis				
Second degree chiefdoms	Nkamchi	Fon	Richard Chefon				
Second degree chiefdoms	Nkambé	Fon	Nji Amidu				
Second degree chiefdoms	Nkar	Fon	Molo II (Note: Real name Peter Adi Fonte Patrick Wirba)				
Second degree chiefdoms	Ngarum	Fon	Nganji IV	2018			
Second degree chiefdoms	Nseh	Fon	Senyuy Oliver N. Fonban II				
Second degree chiefdoms	Oku	Fon	Ngum IV (Note: Real name Ngum Ernest Merlin Shang)				
Second degree chiefdoms	Tabenken	Fon	Ngwayi Polycarp Ndiborti				
Second degree chiefdoms	Talla	Fon	Isaac Nfor Bassa	2010			
Second degree chiefdoms	Weh	Fon	Mbuh II				
Central African Republic	Bangassou	Sultan	Maxime Faustin Mbringa Takama	2011		Hereditary	
Central African Republic	Birao / Vakaga	Sultan	Ahmad Moustapha Am-Gabo				
Central African Republic	Dar al Kuti / N'Délé	Sultan	Ibrahim Kamoun Senoussi	2014		Hereditary	
Central African Republic	Rafai	Sultan	Joseph Hetman el Roosalem			Hereditary	
Chad	Baguirmi	Mbang	Mahamat Yusuf	14 June 1970	Baguirmi	Hereditary	
Chad	Ouaddai	Sultan	Cherif Abdelhadi Mahdi	August 2019	Maba	Hereditary	
Congo	Loango	Maloango	vacant	23 December 2020	Loango	Hereditary and elective	
Congo	Teke	Õkoo	Michael Ganari Nsalou II	1960,1991		Hereditary	
Congo Democratic Republic	Babungwe	Mwami	Sindi Charles Sami III			Hereditary	
Congo Democratic Republic	Bufuliru	Mwami	Ndare III Simba Kalingishi Adams			Hereditary	
Congo Democratic Republic	Buhunde	Mwami	Kalinda Nicolas			Hereditary	
Congo Democratic Republic	Bakwa Luntu	Mukalenga Mukaji wa Nkashama wa Bakwa Luntu wa Baluba wa Kasaï wa Congo	Diambi Kabatusuila				
Congo Democratic Republic	Basanga	Mulopwe	Mathieu Pembamoto Kyala			Hereditary	
Congo Democratic Republic	Basile	Mwami	Kalega Riziki Lwango II Lucien			Hereditary	
Congo Democratic Republic	Bashu	Mwami	Abdul Paluku Kalemire III			Hereditary	
Congo Democratic Republic	Buhavu	Mwami	Kamirogosa III Shosho Ntale Franc			Hereditary	
Congo Democratic Republic	Bukumu	Mwami	Kahembe IV Isaac Butsitsi			Hereditary	
Congo Democratic Republic	Burhunyi	Mwami	Muganga Bulala II Richard			Hereditary	
Congo Democratic Republic	Buzi	Mwami	Sangara Amri Hubert II			Hereditary	
Congo Democratic Republic	Bwisha	Mwami	Jean Baptiste Ndeze Rekatubere			Hereditary	
Congo Democratic Republic	Garanganze (Yeke)	Mwami	M'siri Mwenda VIII Bantu Godefroid Munongo			Hereditary	
Congo Democratic Republic	Kabare	Mwami	Nabushi Désiré Kabare Rugemaninzi II			Hereditary	
Congo Democratic Republic	Kakwa		David Tsukia Likambo			Hereditary	
Congo Democratic Republic	Kasongo Lunda	Kiamvu	Kiamvu Frederic Inkani			Hereditary	
Congo Democratic Republic	Kaziba	Mwami	Mwami Dirk Majiri IV Nakaziba Chimanye			Hereditary	
Congo Democratic Republic	Kuba	Nyim	Kot a Mbweeki III			Hereditary	
Congo Democratic Republic	Luba	Mulopwe	Diambi Kabatusuila			Hereditary	
Congo Democratic Republic	Luhwindja	Mwami	Mwami Naluhwindja Tony Chibwire V			Hereditary	
Congo Democratic Republic	Lunda	Mwaantayaav	Mushid III			Hereditary	
Congo Democratic Republic	Mayogo Magbaie		Justin Somana			Hereditary	
Congo Democratic Republic	Ngweshe	Mwami	Mwami Ngweshe XV Pierre Ndatabaye Weza III			Hereditary	
Congo Democratic Republic	Ntambuka	Mwami	Mwami Ntambuka Balekage Mihigo III Roger			Hereditary	
Congo Democratic Republic	Rubenga	Mwami	Rubenga			Hereditary	
Congo Democratic Republic	South Kasai	Mulopwe	vacant	1962	South Kasai		
Congo Democratic Republic	Vira	Mwami	Mwami Lwegeleza III			Hereditary	
Congo Democratic Republic	Wamuzimu	Mwami	Mwami Longangi IV Nen'Ilungu Kampangalasa			Hereditary	
Equatorial Guinea	Bubi		vacant (Note: The last recognised king was Malabo II, who died in 2001. The throne has remained vacant since then.)	15 November 2001	Bahítáari	Hereditary	
Equatorial Guinea	Equatoguinean Muslims	Imam	Pedro Benigno Matute Tang			Hereditary and elective	
Ethiopia	Aussa	Royal Chief	Akula	19 September 2020		Hereditary	
Gabon	Benga	King	Marcel Nkombouet				
Gabon	Orungu	Agamwinboni	Mbongo Ntchounga			Hereditary	
Gambia	Fuladugu		Farli Baldeh	1997		Hereditary	
Gambia	The Gambia & Kombo North District	Paramount chief	Alhaji Momodou Bojang			Hereditary	
Ghana	Akuapem	Okuapehene/Paramount Chief	Okuapehene Oseadeeyo Kwasi Akuffo III	3 May 2020	Asona Clan	Hereditary	
Ghana	Akwamu	Akwamuhene/Paramount Chief	Odeneho Kwafo Akoto III	2011	Aduana Clan	Hereditary	
Ghana	Akyem Abuakwa	Okyehene/Paramount Chief	Osagyefuo Amoatia Ofori Panin	4 October 1999	Asona Clan	Hereditary	
Ghana	Aowin	Omanhene	Beyeman Brentum III		Western Regional House of Chiefs	Hereditary	
Ghana	Asante	Otumfuo, the Asantehene	Otumfuo Nana Osei Tutu II	26 April 1999	Oyoko and President of the Ashanti Regional House of Chiefs	Hereditary	
Ghana	Asante Akyem Hwidiem	Saamanhene (Divisional Chief/Prince)	Nana Òkofrobòur Ababio II	August 7, 2015		Hereditary	
Ghana	Asogli	Agbogbomefia	Togbe Afede XIV	4 October 2003	Volta Regional House of Chiefs	Hereditary	
Ghana	Dagbon	Overlord	Yaa Naa Bukali Mahama II	January 18, 2019	Andani and Northern Regional House of Chiefs	Hereditary	
Ghana	Dormaa	Omanhene	Osagyefo Oseadeeyo Agyemang-Badu II		Brong Ahafo Regional House of Chiefs	Hereditary	
Ghana	Gonja	King	Yagbongurwa Tuntumba Sulemana Jakpa Bore Essa I	2010	Northern Regional House of Chiefs	Hereditary	
Ghana	Gbi	Fiaga/Paramount Chief	Togbega gabusu VI	25 May 1989, d. 18 January 2020	Torkoni Clan, Divisional Chief of Gbi-Hohoe, Volta Regional House of Chiefs	Hereditary	
Ghana	Gbi	Divisional Chief/Prince	Togbe Osei III	2002	Gbi-Godenu	Hereditary	
Ghana	Kwahu	Okwahuhene/Kwahumanhene/ Paramount Chief	Daasebre Akuamoah Agyapong II	2017	Bretuo Clan	Hereditary	
Ghana	Mankessim	Omanhene	Osagyefo Amanfo Edu IV of Fante		Asona Clan/Central Regional House of Chiefs	Hereditary	
Ghana	Sefwi Anhiawso	Omanhene	Ogyeahohoo Yaw Gyebi II		Western North Regional House of Chiefs	Hereditary	
Ghana	Sefwi Bekwai	Omanhene	Odeneho Gyapong Ababio II		Western North Regional House of Chiefs	Hereditary	
Ghana	Sefwi Wiawso	Omanhene	Katakyie Kwasi Bumankamah II		Western North Regional House of Chiefs	Hereditary	
Ghana	Sefwi Chirano	Omanhene	Okogyeaman Kwaku Gyamprah III		Western North Regional House of Chiefs	Hereditary	
Ghana	Suaman	Omanhene	Odeneho Bentum IV		Western North Regional House of Chiefs	Hereditary	
Guinea-Bissau	Guinea-Bissau	Paramount chief	Agosto Fernandes			Hereditary	
Ivory Coast	Kru chiefdoms		King David, His Majesty King Tchiffi Zae Jean-Gervais				
Ivory Coast	N'Zima Kotoko	King	Amon Paul Désiré Tanow				
Ivory Coast	Sanwi	King of Sanwi	Amon N'Douffou V	5 August 2005		Hereditary	
Kenya	Wanga	Nabongo	Peter Mumia II	1980		Hereditary	
Liberia	Nimba		Franklin D. Toweh			Hereditary	
Madagascar	Madagascar	King Ndriana Rabarioelina		Merina	Hereditary Divine Election		
Madagascar	Sakalava Bemazaba Nosy Faly	King	Tsiaraso IV Rachidy	1993		Hereditary	
Madagascar	Sakalava Bemihisatra of Analalava		Mpanjaka Zalifa Bente Salim	2017		Hereditary	
Madagascar	Sakalava Bemihisatra of Nosy Be		vacant			Hereditary	
Madagascar	Sakalava Menabe		vacant	2017		Hereditary	
Malawi	Jere		Inkosi ya Makosi M'mbelwa V	June 1996	Ngoni	Hereditary and elective	
Malawi	Lomwe (Note: This paramount chieftaincy, reigning over all tribes of that particular nationality, was created by the government, a presidential prerogative guaranteed in the country's Constitution. Prior to its creation, the various tribal authorities remained independent of one another. Many chiefs have dismissed the notion that they are now subordinate to a centralised authority.)	Paramount Chief	Mkhumba	25 October 2008	Mihavani	Elective and hereditary	
Malawi	Mang'anja		Lundu Nkhuku	2002	Lundu (Note: A Chewa dynasty.)	Hereditary and elective	
Malawi	Maseko		Inkosi ya Makosi Gomani V (Note: The current chief, Willard Mswati Gomani, was appointed at his father's burial in 2009. He has not yet been formally enthroned. He is also a minor, and reigns under the regency of his aunt, Rosemary Malinki.)	26 September 2009	Ngoni	Hereditary and elective	
Malawi	Ngonde		Ntemi Kyungu	September 2007	Kyungu	Elective and hereditary	
Malawi	Tumbuka		Themba la Mathemba Chikulamayembe	September 2007	Chikulamayembe	Elective and hereditary	
Malawi	Yao	Paramount Chief	Chikowi	15 February 2009	Yao	Elective and hereditary	
Mali	Liptako	Emir	Ousmane Amirou Dicko			Hereditary	
Mali	Mali	Mansa	vacant		Keita	Hereditary	
Mauritania	Tagant	Emir	Mohamed Ould Abderrahmane	February 2003	Idawi	Hereditary	
Mauritania	Trarza	Emir	Muhammad Fall wuld `Umayr		Ḥassān	Hereditary	
Namibia	Afrikaner	Kaptein	Eduard Afrikaner	24 July 2016	Oorlam (Note: A tribe of the Nama.)	Hereditary and elective	
Namibia	Bakgalagadi	Kgosi	Hubert Ditshabue	18 April 1992	Kgalagadi	Hereditary and elective	
Namibia	Baster	Kaptein	John McNab	January 1999	N/A	Elective (Note: The captaincy of the Basters, recognised as a traditional authority by the government of Namibia, is purely elective within the community. The kaptein is elected for life.)	
Namibia	Berseba (Note: The land of the Hai-khaua, a tribe of the Nama descended from the Oorlam. The community is also known as the "Berseba Oorlam" or "Berseba Nama".)	Kaptein	Stephanus Goliath; Johannes Isaak	24 April 2010 (Note: In 2010, the formerly divided Hai-khauan chiefdom of Berseba was reconciled under the cooperative leadership of the royal Goliath and Isaak clans. The two rival lineages had resulted from a succession dispute for the chieftaincy in the 1960s. Prior to the recent union, Stephanus had been the chief of the Goliath faction since 1976. Johannes Isaak had been the chief of his faction prior to the union also, but the date of his installation is unclear.)	Goliath; Isaak	Elective and hereditary	
Namibia	Bethanie (Note: The land of the Aman, a tribe of the Nama descended from the Oorlam. The community is also known as "Bethany", or subsequently the "Bethanien Nama".)	Kaptein	Dawid Frederiks	1 June 1984	Frederiks	Hereditary and elective	
Namibia	Bondelswarts	Kaptein	Anna Christiaan (Note: The incumbent kaptein, Anna Christiaan, no longer actively manages the tribe's affairs due to her poor health. Officially serving as acting chief is Josef Christiaan, whose position, however, is disputed by several senior members of the royal family, including Anna's son Jan Christiaan.)	20 May 1977	!Gami-nun	Hereditary and elective	
Namibia	Damara	Gaob	Justus ǁGaroëb	September 1993 (Note: Prior to formal enthronement as "king" (a title not recognised by the Namibian government), Justus previously reigned as acting paramount chief from 1982. He took over the leadership of the Chiefs' Council on 27 July 1977, following the death of Chief David Goreseb.)	N/A	Elective	
Namibia	Gciriku	Hompa	Kassian Shiyambi	14 May 1999	Gciriku (Note: A Kavango dynasty.)	Hereditary and elective	
Namibia	Hai-om	’Aiha	David Khamuxab	17 December 2000 (Note: Recognised by the government of Namibia on 28 July 2004.)	Hai-om (Note: A San dynasty.)	Elective and hereditary	
Namibia	Hawoben		vacant (Note: The previous kaptein was Hans Titus, who reigned from 3 May 1980 until his death in 2009. His successor is yet to be chosen.)	4 March 2009	Hawoben	Elective and hereditary	
Namibia	Herero	Ombara	vacant		Ovaherero	Elective and hereditary	
Namibia	Hoachanas (Note: The land of the Kai-khau, a tribe of the Nama. The community is also known as the "Red Nation".)	Kaptein	Petrus Simon Moses Kooper	3 December 1988	Kooper	Hereditary and elective	
Namibia	Ju’hoansi	’Aiha	Tsamkxao Oma	5 July 1990	Ju’hoa	Elective and hereditary	
Namibia	!Kung	’Aiha	John Arnold	28 February 1990	!Kung	Elective and hereditary	
Namibia	Mafwe	Litunga	Mamili VII (Note: Also known as George Simasiku Mamili.)	18 April 1999	Mamili (Note: A Fwe dynasty.)	Hereditary and elective	
Namibia	Masubiya	Munitenge	Liswani III (Note: Also known as Maiba Kisco Liswani.)	19 August 1996	Subiya	Hereditary and elective	
Namibia	Mayeyi	Shikati	Boniface Sifu	1 August 1993	Yeyi	Hereditary and elective	
Namibia	Mbukushu	Fumu	Erwin Mbambo Munika	3 May 1991	Mbukushu	Hereditary and elective	
Namibia	Mbunza	Hompa	Frans Haingura Muronga	25 May 1996	Mbunza	Hereditary and elective	
Namibia	Ombalantu	Elenga	Oswin Shifiona Mukulu	13 May 1983	Mbalantu (Note: An Ovambo dynasty.)	Hereditary and elective	
Namibia	Ombandja	Elenga	Mathias Walaula	29 March 2004	Mbandja	Hereditary and elective	
Namibia	Ondonga	Omukwaniilwa	Fillemon Shuumbwa Nangolo	14 April 2019	Ndonga	Hereditary and elective	
Namibia	Ongandjera	Omukwaniilwa	Japhet Malenga Munkundi	16 November 1971	Ngandjera	Hereditary and elective	
Namibia	Shambyu	Hompa	Angelina Matumbo Ribebe	19 May 1989	Sambyu	Hereditary and elective	
Namibia	Topnaar	Kaptein	Seth Kooitjie	28 June 1980	Aonin	Elective and hereditary	
Namibia	Swartbooi	Kaptein	Daniël Luipert	15 November 1986	Khau-goa	Elective and hereditary	
Namibia	Uukolonkadhi	Elenga	David Shooya	27 June 1985	Kolonkhadi	Hereditary and elective	
Namibia	Uukwaluudhi	Omukwaniilwa	Shikongo Taapopi (Note: Full name is Josia Shikongo Taapopi Shitaatala.)	20 September 1960	Kwaluudhi	Hereditary and elective	
Namibia	Uukwambi	Elenga	Herman Iipumbu	10 April 1991	Kwambi	Hereditary and elective	
Namibia	Uukwangali	Hompa	Eugene Siwombe Kudumo	25 April 2015	Kwangali	Hereditary and elective	
Namibia	Uukwanyama	Ohamba	Martha Nelumbu (Note: A queen. Also known as Martha Kristian Nelumbu, or Martha Mwadinomho ya Nelumbu.)	12 November 2005	Kwanyama	Hereditary and elective	
Namibia	Vaalgras	Kaptein	Joel Stephanus	6 April 1975	Oorlam	Elective and hereditary	
Namibia	Witbooi (Note: The land of the Khowese, a tribe of the Nama descended from the Oorlam. The community is also known as the "Khowese Nama", or as "Gibeon" after the township.)	Kaptein	Christian Rooi (Note: Acting chief only. Rooi took over administration of the traditional authority following the death of Hendrik Witbooi, a Christian minister and Namibia's first deputy prime minister. Rooi has not been formally mandated as chief.)	13 October 2009	Witbooi	Hereditary and elective	
Namibia Herero chiefs	Ovaherero (Note: Within the Herero community, the Namibian government officially recognises six traditional authorities, each headed by its own royal house. The six are listed here, grouped by tribe. Officially, these are subordinate to a paramount chief in Okahandja, who is listed in the previous section. In addition, there are over 40 other Herero chiefs who remain unrecognised by the government, and are not constitutional traditional authorities.)	Ombara	Tuhavi David Kambazembi	17 July 1989	Kambazembi	Hereditary and elective	
Namibia Herero chiefs	Ovaherero	Ombara	Alfons Maharero	1969 (Note: In 1999, Alfons was also proclaimed chief of the Tjamuaha clan by court order, deposing Frederik II. The Tjamuaha are among those clans not recognised as constitutional traditional authorities.)	Maharero	Hereditary and elective	
Namibia Herero chiefs	Ovaherero	Ombara	Christiaan Eerike Zeraua	4 October 1997	Zeraua	Hereditary and elective	
Namibia Herero chiefs	Ovahimba	Ombara	Paulus Tjavara	3 August 1996	Otjikaoko	Hereditary and elective	
Namibia Herero chiefs	Ovahimba	Ombara	vacant (Note: The previous ombara of the Vita lineage was Kapuka Thom, who died in 2009. His successor has yet to be chosen.)	31 October 2009	Vita	Hereditary and elective	
Namibia Herero chiefs	Ovambanderu	Ombara	Keharanjo II	9 August 2008	Nguvauva	Hereditary and elective	
Niger	Aïr	Amenukal	Oumarou Ibrahim Oumarou	2012	Tuareg	Hereditary and elective (Note: Succession is hereditary within the royal family, but is subject to approval by five electing tribes: the Kel Owi, Kel Ferwan, Kel Fade, Imakkitan, and Ikaskazan.)	
Niger	Dosso	Djermakoy	Maidanda	2000	Djerma	Hereditary	
Niger	Kokorou	King	Dr. Issifi Djibey	8 February 2026	Askiya (Note: A Songhai dynasty.)	Hereditary and elective	
Niger	Liptako	Emir	Ousmane Amirou Dicko				
Niger	Lougou		Sarauniya Aljima				
Niger	Maradi	Sarkin	Alhaji Ahmed Ali Zaki	5 December 2022	Durbawa (Note: A Hausa dynasty.)	Elective and hereditary	
Niger	Téra	Askya	Sa'id Amaru	1952	Askiya	Hereditary	
Niger	Zinder (Damagaram)	Sarkin	Aboubakar Oumarou Sanda	2011	Damagaram	Elective and hereditary	
Nigeria	Agbor	Dein	Dein Benjamin Ikechukwu Kiagborekuzi I	1979		Hereditary and elective	
Nigeria	Ake	Oba	Adedotun Aremu Gbadebo III	2005	Egba Alake clan dynasty of the Yoruba people	Hereditary and elective	
Nigeria	Akure	Oba	Aladetoyinbo Ogunlade Aladelusi Odundun II	8 July 2015	Omoremilekun Asodeboyede dynasty of the Yoruba people	Hereditary and elective	
Nigeria	Benin	Oba	Ewuare II	2016		Hereditary Patrilineal Primogeniture	
Nigeria	Bida	Etsu	Yahaya Abubakar	2003		Hereditary and elective	
Nigeria	Borno	Shehu	Abubakar Ibn Umar Garbai El-Kanemi	2009		Hereditary and elective	
Nigeria	Edem	Eze (Agaba-Idu)	Nwabueze Annekwempaha Ezea II	16 July 2009	Ezea Ugwoke		
Nigeria	Ikateland	Oba	Saheed Ademola Elegushi, Kusenla II	27 April 2010	Kusenla	Hereditary and elective	
Nigeria	Ile Ife		Adeyeye Enitan Ogunwusi Ojaja II	26 October 2015	Giesi of the Oranmiyan dynasty	Hereditary and elective	
Nigeria	Ilesa		Owa Gabriel Adekunle Aromolaran II			Hereditary and elective	
Nigeria	Itele	Moyegeso	Mufutau Adesanya Kasali Iboriaran I	3 March 2003	Ishagbola of the Moyegeso dynasty-cum-Fidipote, Idewon, Ijebu Ode	Hereditary and elective	
Nigeria	Kano	Emir	Muhammadu Sanusi II	24 May 2024	House of Kano (descent from Ibrahim Dabo)	Hereditary and elective	
Nigeria	Kumbwada	Queen	Hajiya Haidzatu Ahmed	1998		Hereditary through the female line	
Nigeria	Lagos	Oba	Rilwan Babatunde Osuolale Aremu Akiolu I	9 August 2003		Hereditary and elective	
Nigeria	Ariiọba Ikale	Abodi	George Babatunde Faduyile Adegun II	24 December 1997		Hereditary and elective	
Nigeria	Nasarawa Emirate	Emir	Ibrahim Usman Jibril	2018		Hereditary and elective	
Nigeria	Nembe	Amanyanabo	Edmund Maduabebe Daukoru, Mingi XII	2008		Hereditary and elective	
Nigeria	Nnewi	Igwe	Kenneth Onyeneke Orizu III	1963		Hereditary and elective	
Nigeria	Nri	Ezre Nri	Enweleana II Obidiegwo Onyeso	1988		Hereditary and elective	
Nigeria	Onitsha	Obi	Nnayelugo Alfred Nnaemeka Achebe	3 June 2002	Onitsha subgroup of the Igbo people	Elective	
Nigeria	Orlu Gedegwum	Igwe	Patrick II Acholonu	2009		Hereditary	
Nigeria	Oyo	Alaafin	Abimbola Owoade	5 April 2025		Hereditary	
Nigeria	Sokoto	Sultan	Sa'adu Abubakar	2006		Hereditary and elective	
Nigeria	Ugbo Kingdom	Oba	Fredrick Obateru Akinruntan	2009	Adetolugbo	Hereditary and elective	
Nigeria	Warri	Olu	Ogiame Atuwatse III	2021		Hereditary and elective	
Rwanda	Rwanda	King of Rwanda (Mwami)	Emmanuel Bushayija Yuhi VI	9 January 2017	Abanyiginya	Hereditary	
Senegal	Oussouye		Daniel LauShaun Kipchoge Choubassi-Roberts	18 January 2001	Jola	Elective	
Senegal	Kingdom of Sine	Maad a Sinig	Maad a Sinig Niokhobaye Fatou Diène Diouf	8 February 2019	Semou Njekeh Joof	Hereditary	
Sierra Leone	Luawa		Mohamed Kailondo Banya			Hereditary	
Sierra Leone	Mambolo		Sumanoh Kapen			Hereditary	
Somalia	Majeerteen Sultanate	Boqor	Burhan Boqor Muse	24 May 2014	Majeerteen	Hereditary	
Somaliland	Isaaq Sultanate	Sultan	Daud Sultan Mahamed	13 February 2021	Rer Guled	Hereditary	
Somaliland	Habr Yunis Sultanate	Sultan	Osman Sultan Ali	1979	Rer Ainanshe	Hereditary	
Somaliland	Habr Je'lo	Sultan	Abdillahi Sultan Ali		Rer Yonis	Hereditary	
Somaliland	Habr Awal	Sultan	Hasan Sultan Abdillahi	2009	Ahmed Abdallah	Hereditary	
Somaliland	Arap	Sultan	Abdirahman Sultan Omar	15 September 2021	Arap	Hereditary	
Somaliland	Dhulbahante	Garad	Jama Garad Ali	24 April 2006	Farah Garad	Hereditary	
South Africa	Bakwêna (Note: In April 2008, the CTLDC determined that the baKwêna (also spelled baKoena) ba Mopeli paramountcy was not a legitimate kingship, and hence in July 2010, the government announced that it would cease recognising it as such upon the death of the incumbent monarch.)		Morena Moremoholo Mopeli (Note: The present kgosi is a minor. His mother, Mathokwana Mopeli serves as regent on his behalf.)	2018	Mopeli	Hereditary and elective	
South Africa	Bapedi	Kgosi	Thulare Victor Thulare (Note: Was declared the legitimate monarch by President Zuma in July 2010, following the rulings of the CTLDC, Zuma replaced acting chief Kenneth Kgagudi Sekhukhune, who had been reigning in dispute since 1976.)	29 July 2010	Maroteng	Hereditary and elective	
South Africa	Batlôkwa (Note: In April 2008, the CTLDC determined that the baTlôkwa (also spelled baTlokoa) ba Mota paramountcy was not a legitimate kingship, and hence in July 2010, the government announced that it would cease recognising it as such upon the death of the incumbent monarch.)		Morena Montoeli Mota	2015	Mota (Note: Also known as the ba ga Mokotleng, one of four main branches of the baTlôkwa. The others are: ba ga Bogatsu under Kgosi Mokalake Motsatsi, ba ga Sedumedi under Kgosi Sedumedi Kenneth Sedumedi (who died 25 September 2007), and the ba ga Gaborone in Botswana. The ba Mota are the only recognised paramountcy of the baTlôkwa in South Africa, although this will soon change (see note above).)	Hereditary and elective	
South Africa	Mpondo (Note: Since the death of Faku in 1867, the amaMpondo (also amaPondo, or amaPonda) have effectively been divided under two royal lineages: the Mqikela line (aseQaukeni), and the Ndamase line (aseNyandeni). In April 2008, however, the CTLDC determined that the kings of the Mqikela lineage were the kings of all amaMpondo, and that the Nyandeni paramountcy was not a legitimate kingship. In July 2010, it was announced that the aseNyandeni's present status as a kingship would cease to be recognised as such by the government upon the death of the incumbent king, whose successor will instead be considered a "principal traditional leader", a status yet to be defined.)	Kumkani	Zanozuko Tyelovuyo Sigcawu	29 July 2010 (Note: Following the rulings of the CTLDC in July 2010, the Zuma administration officially removed the then-king Mpondombini Thandizulu Sigcawu, and replaced him with Zanozuko Sigcawu, identified as the rightful king by the commission. Mpondombini, who had been ruling since 1 December 1978, was among several traditional leaders to denounce the Commission's findings, and has since taken the government to court in an attempt to reverse the ruling and regain his throne. The hearings began in August 2010. Zanozuko, the king recognised by the government, has yet to be crowned.)	Mqikela (Note: A sept of the Nyawuza clan of the amaMpondo. The amaMpondo are descended from Mpondo, the twin brother of Mpondomise.)	Hereditary and elective	
South Africa	Mpondo	Kumkani	Ndamase Ndamase	8 February 2008 (Note: Coronation took place 12 April 2008. Ndamase was nominated successor to his grandfather, the previous king, upon the elder's death on 21 February 1997. As he was still a minor, however, his mother Queen Bongolethu Dlamini, a descendant of the Swazi royal family, served as the kingdom's regent until his formal assumption of the throne in 2008.)	Ndamase	Hereditary and elective	
South Africa	Mpondomise (Note: Supremacy among the Mpondomise is disputed between two primary factions: the Jola and the Dosini, both branches of the Majola dynasty. Contenders from the Dosini clan are Zanexhoba Tonjeni and Masibulele Maseti. The most recent claimant from the Jola clan was Loyiso Matiwane, who died 12 June 2007. He was a direct descendant of Mhlontlo, the last reigning king, who was stripped of his kingship by the colonial government around 1904 (died in 1912). Since then, the throne of the Mpondomise has been disputed, and has failed to regain recognition from the government as a traditional kingship.)	Kumkani	Luzuko Matiwane	14 January 2020	Majola	Hereditary and elective	
South Africa	Ndebele (Note: Since the death of Musi in 1630, the amaNdebele kingdom has effectively been divided under two royal lineages: the kaManala, and the kaNdzundza. In April 2008, however, the CTLDC determined that the kings of the elder Manala lineage were the kings of all amaNdebele, and that the Ndzundza paramountcy was not a legitimate kingship. In July 2010, it was announced that the Ndzundza's present status as a kingship would cease to be recognised as such by the government upon the death of the incumbent king, whose successor will instead be considered a "principal traditional leader", a status yet to be defined.)	Ingwenyama	Makhosoke II (Note: Full name is Makhosoke Enoch Mabhena; also occasionally spelled "Makhosoke".)		Manala-Mbongo (Note: A sept of the Manala clan of the amaNdebele. The current royal family has the surname Mabhena, also occasionally misspelled "Mabena".)	Hereditary and elective	
South Africa	Ndebele	Ingwenyama	Mbusi Mahlangu (Note: In the Ndebele tradition, following the death of a king the family nominates a successor and gives him a regnal name, which he will use from the day he is crowned. Mbusi has been elected, but has not yet been formally enthroned. His regnal name will be "Mabhoko III". However, as of 2 February 2007, Mbusi has been suspended as king by the royal council. A regent, Sililo Mahlangu, was appointed on 4 February 2007 to act on the king's behalf while the council deliberates on his alleged misconduct.)	1 July 2005	Ndzundza-Mabhoko (Note: A sept of the Ndzundza clan of the amaNdebele. The current royal family has the surname Mahlangu.)	Hereditary and elective	
South Africa	Thembu (Note: Since 1865, the abaThembu have effectively been divided under two royal lineages: the bakaDalindyebo (baseBumbane), and the bakaMatanzima (baseRhoda). In April 2008, however, the CTLDC determined that the kings of the Dalindyebo lineage were the kings of all abaThembu, and that the Rhoda paramountcy was not a legitimate kingship. In July 2010, it was announced that the baseRhoda's present status as a kingship would cease to be recognised as such by the government upon the death of the incumbent king, whose successor will instead be considered a "principal traditional leader", a status yet to be defined. According to some reports, the late king Lwandile Zwelenkosi, who died in May 2010, was officially considered the last king.)	Kumkani	Buyelekhaya Dalindyebo (Note: Full name is Buyelekhaya Zwelinbanzi Dalindyebo a Sabata.)	May 1989 (Note: During a leave of study between 2000 and August 2002, the king's wife Noluntu and brother Jongisizwe Dalindyebo acted as regents on his behalf. In May 2005, Buyelekhaya was indicted on charges of fraud, culpable homicide, assault, kidnapping, and arson. He is appealing against a 15-year jail term. Queen Noluntu and senior chief Jonginyaniso Mtirara are serving as regents while the monarch is in and out of prison.)	Dalindyebo (Note: A sept of the amaDlomo clan of the abaThembu. It is also known as the amaHala, or Madiba clan; each name styled after one of the earliest kings, descendants of the kingdom's founder, Nxeko.)	Hereditary and elective	
South Africa	Thembu	Kumkani	Siyambonga Matanzima (Note: Full name is Siyambonga Dalimvula Matanzima.)	31 May 2010	Matanzima	Hereditary and elective	
South Africa	Venda (Note: Since the disappearance of Thohoyandou in 1770, the vhaVenda have effectively been divided under several royal lineages. Among these, the haRamabulana, the haTshivhase, and the haMphaphuli were eventually recognised as separate traditional authorities by the government. The kingship, however, disputed between an even larger number of clans, was considered to be effectively defunct until July 2010, when the CTLDC determined to restore the vhaVenda kingship under the haRamabulana. The commission determined that the kings of the Ramabulana were the kings of all vhaVenda, thereby rejecting the appeals of two other claimants: the Ravhura clan under Azwianewi David Mutshinyalo Ravhura, and the vhaNgona tribe under Tshidziwelele Azwidowi Nephawe, both of which were officially under the jurisdiction of the haTshivhase. The commission also rejected the respective appeals of the haTshivhase and haMphaphuli to establish new kingships separate to that of the vhaVenda.)	Thovhele	Toni Mphephu Ramabulana	28 November 1998	Ramabulana (Note: A clan of the Masingo (also known as the maKhwinde, or maKwinda) tribe of the vhaVenda. Although the title thovele (or thovela) is most common, kings are also formally styled khosikhulu vho, or simply khosi.)	Hereditary and elective	
South Africa	Xhosa (Note: Since the death of Phalo in 1775, the amaXhosa have effectively been divided under two kingdoms (see note below). However, in April 2008, the CTLDC determined that the kings of the Gcaleka lineage were the kings of all amaXhosa, and that the Rharhabe paramountcy was not a legitimate kingship. In July 2010, it was announced that the Rharhabe's present status as a kingship would cease to be recognised as such by the government upon the death of the incumbent king, whose successor will instead be considered a "principal traditional leader", a status yet to be defined.)	Kumkani	Ahlangene Sigcawu	16 October 2020	Gcaleka (Note: A Xhosa dynasty. All current Xhosa monarchs are genealogical members of the amaTshawe clan, the royal line of the amaXhosa which is styled after Tshawe, descended from Xhosa, a son of Mnguni. The royal line is divided into two primary lineages descended from the sons of Phalo: the amaGcaleka, descended from Gcaleka, and the amaRharhabe, descended from Rharhabe. The amaGcaleka are the senior line, and its king is to some extent deferred to by all the others. The amaRharhabe represents the junior line, from which also descend the Kings of the imiDushane, amaGasela, amaNdlambe, and imiQhayi, listed separately. The ruling line of the amaRharhabe is that of the amaNgqika, descended from Mlawu.)	Hereditary and elective	
South Africa	Xhosa	Kumkani	Jonguxolo Sandile	12 July 2020	Rharhabe	Hereditary and elective	
South Africa	Zulu (Note: The Zulu kingdom is traditionally a paramount authority, with a number of subordinate chiefdoms. Most prominent among these chiefdoms is that of the Buthelezi, whose current chief (or inkosi) is Mangosuthu Gatsha.)	Ingonyama yamaZulu	Misuzulu Zulu	7 May 2021	Zulu (Note: A clan of the Zulu.)	Hereditary and elective	
South Africa Venda paramounts	Mphaphuli	Thovhele	Musiiwa Gole Mphaphuli	18 December 2001	Mphaphuli	Hereditary and elective	
South Africa Venda paramounts	Tshivhase	Thovhele	Kennedy Midiyavhathu Tshivhase	1993 (Note: Midiyavhathu was installed as heir to the throne of the Tshivhase lineage in 1970. He was, however, considered too young to rule, and his uncle John Shavhani Tshivhase was appointed as regent until it was deemed appropriate for the new king to assume effective office, which he did in 1993. His name is also often spelled "Midiavhathu".)	Tshivhase	Hereditary and elective	
South Africa Xhosa paramounts	imiDushane	Kumkani	Ngubesizwe Ludwe Siwane	June 2001	Mdushane	Hereditary and elective	
South Africa Xhosa paramounts	Gasela	Kumkani	Mabikhwe Zwelandile	14 February 1947	Gasela	Hereditary and elective	
South Africa Xhosa paramounts	Gqunukhwebe	Inkosi	Nkosana Zwelimjongile Kama	14 September 2002	Kama (Note: The amaGqunukhwebe are a Xhosa tribe of Khoisan origin.)	Hereditary and elective	
South Africa Xhosa paramounts	Ntinde	Kumkani	Zwelitsha a Mgcawezulu	16 September 1946	Ntinde	Hereditary and elective	
South Africa Xhosa paramounts	Qhayi	Kumkani	Mabundu Bangelizwe Jali		Qhayi	Hereditary and elective	
South Africa other paramounts	Bafokeng	Kgosi	Leruo Tshekedi Molotlegi	April 2000 (Note: Coronation took place 16 August 2003.)	Molotlegi	Hereditary and elective	
South Africa other paramounts	Balobedu		vacant (Note: The previous queen, Modjadji VI, died in 2005. Her daughter and heiress, Princess Masalanabo, is still a child, and will be eligible to be enthroned as Modjadji VII when she comes of age and once she has produced an heiress of her own by her royal suitor. Her succession rights, however, have not been universally accepted by the royal council since her father is a commoner. Her uncle Prince Mpapatla serves as regent. He has had a daughter by his cousin of the royal bloodline. Consequently, a faction of the royal council would prefer to enthrone Mpapatla's daughter when she comes of age. He, however, maintains that the true heir is Masalanabo, who has been accepted as heiress for now, though this may change before she comes of age.)	12 June 2005	Modjadji (Note: The "Rain Queens" of the baLobedu ba ga Modjadji are descended from the Monomatapa dynasty in modern Zimbabwe.)	Hereditary and elective (Note: Succession is matrilineal. The queen is constitutionally unwed, although she may produce children.)	
South Africa other paramounts	Bhaca	King	Madzikane II		King Ncapai	Hereditary and elective	
South Africa other paramounts	Griqua	Paramount Chief	Alan Andrew le Fleur	8 November 2005	Le Fleur (Note: The Le Fleur lineage is based in Kranshoek, Western Cape.)	Hereditary and elective	
South Africa other paramounts	Griqua	Paramount Chief	Adam Kok V	1991	Kok (Note: The Kok lineage is based in Campbell, Northern Cape.)	Hereditary and elective	
South Africa other paramounts	Hlubi	Kumkani	Langalibalele II (Note: Otherwise known as Muziwenkosi Johannes Hadebe ka Tatazela. The royal clan name, Hadebe, is also often spelled "Radebe".)	1974	Hadebe	Hereditary and elective	
Sudan; South Sudan	Abyei	Emir	Kuol Deng Kuol	19 February 1976	Ngok (Note: A clan of the Dinka people. The Ngok are traditionally divided into nine chiefdoms.)	Hereditary and elective	
Sudan; South Sudan	Anuak	King	Adongo Agada Cham	2 May 2001	Nyiudola	Hereditary (Note: The reigning king, considered by the Anuak to be a demigod, selects his heir from amongst his eligible sons.)	
Sudan; South Sudan	Azende Kingdom	King	Atoroba Rikito Gbudue	9 February 2022		Hereditary	
Sudan; South Sudan	Shilluk	Reth	Kwongo wad Dak	4 August 1993 (Note: Date of formal enthronement. He was elected to the throne in 1992.)	Kwathker	Hereditary and elective (Note: The reth is chosen from the sons of previous kings, each belonging to one of three royal lineages: Kwathker, Gwang, and Nyidhok. The elected individual is traditionally said to be a reincarnation of the first reth, Nyikango wad Okwa.)	
Tanzania	Mwene Mbonwean Sultanate of Ujiji	Kolo	Othman Hamza Malilo II	2017			
Tanzania	Shambalai	Mwene	vacant (Note: The last simbamwene (or sultan), Mputa II, died in 2000, and the throne has remained vacant since then. Another member of the family, Daniel Magogo, acts as prince regent.)	2000	Kilindi	Hereditary	
Tanzania	Sukuma		Ntemi Fumakule-Bunamiko-Ndilanha (Note: The last Ntemi -Lyaki ndilanha (or Ntemi), Ntemi-Lyaki Ndilanha, died in 1978, and the throne was transferred to his son Fumakule-Bunamiko-Ndilanha who remains to date although in a passive way because Ntemi Fumakule-Bunamiko-Ndilanha was Christianised. He acts as Clan head.)	Since 1978, aged nine, to date	Ndilanha/Malya/Kina mweri/	Hereditary	
Togo	Aného	Aputaga	Nana Anè Ohiniko Quam Dessou XV	24 March 2012	Adjigo	Hereditary and elective (Note: At the end of March 1821, the chiefdom of Aného became divided under two distinct royal lineages: the Adjigo at Nlessi, and the Lawson dynasty at Lolan. In each lineage, the next king is selected by a council of wisemen from amongst the male members of the royal family. The kings of Aného are traditionally subordinate to ruler of Glidji (see separate entry).)	
Togo	Aného	Togbé Ahuawoto	Savado Lawson VIII	1 August 2002	Lawson	Hereditary and elective	
Togo	Bè	Chief	Togbui Mawuko Aklassou Adélan IV				
Togo	Cokossi	Soma	Na Bema		Soma	Hereditary	
Togo	Dokplala	King/chef	Togbui ahialoho komlan II				
Togo	Kotafon Djanglanmey ethnic Group in Togo	Ga/Chef	Ga Adze Gbokpoe I				
Togo	Notsé	King/Chief	Togbui Agboli K. F. Agokoli IV				
Togo	Glidji	Gè Fiogan	Sèdégbé Foli Bébé XV	1997	Tugban (Note: A clan of the Ga.)	Hereditary	
Togo	Kotokolia	Uro Eso	Yusuf Ayeva		Uro Eso	Hereditary	
Togo	Tado	King	Tonawakpon		2012		
Togo	Togoville	King	Mlapa V Moyennant		Mlapa	Hereditary	
Uganda	Acholi	Rwot	Acana II	15 January 2005 (Note: Date of coronation. The Ker Kwaro Acholi chieftaincy was recognised by the government on 17 January 2005. He has been the chief of the Payira clan since 1999.)	Payira	Hereditary	
Uganda	Alur (Note: The tribal confederation of the Alur historically comprises 64 chiefdoms and Clanship (56 in Uganda i.e. from Junam, Padyere and Okoro; and 8 in Democratic Republic of Congo)under the Ubimu (King). Its population is about 10,000,000 people across two countries. Alur Kingdom was recognised by the Constitution of the Republic of Uganda in 2008. It is the Kingdom that was never abolished by Ugandan government during the 1966 when King Jalusiga Rauni II was sitting at the throne. All the different Chiefdoms, Chieflets and clanships pay allegiance to Ubimu as the main holder of the Royal Spear Head(Leb tong). The different sub tribes that were assimilated under the Alur tribe are the Lendu, Kebu, Jonam and Madi during the pre colonial Uganda (Aidan 1953). The tradition of holding the royal spearhead has been since there since time immemorial. All sons of the Ubimu have since been allowed to start their own chiefdoms in order not to cause power wrangles from the main Kingdom palace at Kaal Atyak winam Zombo district. Alur Kingdom first started as a Nuer Kingdom under King Ngur I in around 870 A.D at Aswan, Southern Egypt and later transformed to Lwo Atyak Kingdom under King Ulwo Atyak in Wau, Barelghazal southern Sudan. Reaching northern Uganda and especially around Karuma river, the Lwo Atyak under King Kyabambe Ulum had a major separation and disintegration. Then Queen Nyilak took over and later abdicated the throne to her son Nyipir. It was king Nyipir who started the Alur Kingdom in around the 15th century in Pakwach near River Nile. His Kingdom holds all the Lwo Royal Spear Head as per the Tradition. Today the Ubimu is the most powerful ruler in northern Uganda West of the Nile river. Administratively, Ubimu is assisted by Jadipu (Prime Minister - Rt. Hon. Wathum Edwin Djalkwiyu) who has the same hereditary significance as a ruler.)	Ubimu	Olarker Rauni III	August 2000 (Note: Formally enthroned on 19 May 2006 and crowned as on 31 October 2010.)	Atyak wi naam	Hereditary	
Uganda	Ankole	Omugabe	Ntare VI (Note: Ankole, historically referred to as Nkore, was nominally revived as a traditional kingdom with the coronation of Rutashijuka Ntare IV in November 1993. It has remained unrecognised by the Ugandan government, however, and the coronation was declared illegitimate and void by the country's president. The current king has reigned in pretendence since the death of his predecessor in April 1979.)	20 November 1993	Bahinda	Hereditary	
Uganda	Bagwere	Ikumbania	Kintu Samuku Balamu of Gwere people	10 October 1993 (Note: Kintu Mubala Samuku succeeded as head of the Bagwere upon the death of Papa Komolo. He was formally installed as Ikumbania (head of the eighty Gwere clans) on 14 November 2009. He was officially proclaimed as Ikumbania upon the restoration of the kingdom, 1995. His coronation took place 14 November 2009)	Lukedi	Elective monarchy	
Uganda	Basimba		Basimba people	10 October 1955 (Note: Katunku VII succeeded as head of the Basimba Leopard Clan royal household upon the death of his father on 10 October 1955. He was formally installed as Chishimba (head of the four Basimba clans) on 24 September 1989. He was officially proclaimed as Chishimba upon the restoration of the kingdom, 24 July 1993. His coronation took place 10 October 1955. He has also assumed the additional name of "Musimba".)	Basimba	Hereditary	
Uganda	Bamasaba	Umukuka		10 October 2016 (Note: . He was formally installed as Umukuka (head of the twenty five Gisu clans) on 24 September 2016. He was officially proclaimed as Umukuka upon the restoration of the kingdom, 1995. His coronation took place 24 September 2016)	Masaba	Elective monarchy	
Uganda	Buganda	Kabaka	Muwenda Mutebi II	24 July 1993 (Note: Muwenda Mutebi succeeded as head of the royal household upon the death of his father on 21 November 1969. He was formally invested as Ssabataka (head of the royal clans and chief landowner) on 4 April 1971. He was officially proclaimed as kabaka upon the restoration of the kingdom, 24 July 1993. His coronation took place 31 July 1993. He has also assumed the additional name of "Kimera".)	Abalasangeye	Hereditary	
Uganda	Bunyoro	Omukama	Solomon Iguru I	24 July 1993 (Note: Muwenda Mutebi succeeded as head of the royal household upon the death of his father in 1971. He was officially proclaimed as omukama upon the restoration of the kingdom, 24 July 1993. His coronation took place 11 June 1994.)	Babito	Hereditary	
Uganda	Busoga (Note: Busoga is a traditional confederation of eleven clan domains. There are five royal clans (Bugabula, Bukono, Bulamogi, Kigulu, and Luuka) and six traditional chiefdoms (Bugweri, Bukooli, Bunya, Bunyole, Busiki, and Butembe). The royal clans form the five royal families of the Basoga. Each of the hereditary chiefs and princes of the confederation are listed in a separate section in the table.)	Kyabazinga	Wilberforce Nadiope IV (Note: The previous kyabazinga, Henry Wako Muloki of Bulamogi, died on 1 September 2008. His son, Edward Columbus Wambuzi, was announced as his successor following contentious elections on 31 October 2008. However, five of the eleven royal chiefs denounced the new king, instead endorsing William Nadiope IV, of Bugabula. The Ugandan government advised the parties to hold another election, and an interim order was served to Wambuzi in May 2009 restraining him from holding office. On 7 June 2009, however, Wambuzi was installed on the throne amidst protests from other chiefs. He also secured a court order blocking the planned re-elections. These took place in secret on 5 October 2009, when Nadiope IV was elected unopposed. The High Court is to start hearing the cases in November 2010, but the clan heads have vowed to install Nadiope IV on the throne before September, despite the standing judicial injunctions blocking the enthronement of either contender.)	5 October 2009	Basoga	Elective and hereditary (Note: The kyabazinga is elected for life by the Royal Council, composed of the eleven hereditary chiefs of the kingdom. Selection is limited to members of the five royal clans of the Basoga.)	
Uganda	Iteso	Emorimor	Augustine Osuban	4 May 2000	(Note: The throne is traditionally supposed to rotate among the numerous clans.)	Elective	
Uganda	Jonam (Note: They belong to the Lwo rulership but not of the Atyak genealogy. The Jonam means people of the lake or stays near the river thus river Nile by location. Today after the declarance of Alur as a kingdom, they began to pay allegiance to Ubimu of Alur as per the constitution of Uganda; although maintain their own administrative sovereignty. Not all the chiefdoms and clanships in Junam belong to the same origin. Some like Ragem, Paroketo and Panyimur came from Bunyoro and the ones that want separation yet few in number while some like Amor, Pangyeth, Boro, Panyigoro, Alwi, among the 14 chiefdoms came from Nyipir lineage of the Lwo Atyak rulership, now with Ubimu Rauni III of Alur. That is why today, Junam is entirely claimed by Ragem - which is the only strongest chiefdom in Junam county of Nebbi District as designated by Mr. White Weatherhead during the British colonisation of Uganda and West Nile in particular.)	Rwoth	Marcellino Olar Ker (although now ousted in March 2013 for self imposition over the Ragem people)	1 March 2008		Hereditary	
Uganda	Kebu Yuu (Note: historically, the kebu had no chieftainship but stayed with the Alur Kings/ Chiefs as pages who produced farming implements (Aidan, 1953). Today they are trying to fight for constitution recognition and proper formation of a Chiefship. Asked about their first chief no one can tell, a testimony that their desire for chiefship is a modern construct.)	Azzu	Ephraim Kebbi	14 June 2008	Yuu (Note: A clan of the Kebu people. The current chief belongs to the Waringu family and still is being contested.)	origin is not very clear.Elective	
Uganda	Kooki	Kamuswaga	Kabumbuli II	15 May 2004	Babito (Note: The kamuswaga belongs to the Ndawula Lwabulanga lineage of the Babito clan.)	Hereditary	
Uganda	Lango	Won Nyaci	Yosam Odur-Ebii	10 December 2005 (Note: Elected to the throne by clan leaders on 17 August 2001.)		Elective	
Uganda	Lugbara	Agofe	Manasseh Amuku Yuma	2023	Ayivu Clan	Elective	
Uganda	Padhola	Adhola	Moses Stephen Owor	7 August 1999 (Note: Elected to the throne by clan leaders on 19 September 1998.)		Elective	
Uganda	Rwenzururu	Omusinga	Irema-Ngoma I	19 October 2009 (Note: The current king, Charles Mumbere, was first proclaimed as "Kibanzanga II" on 19 October 1966. He reigned as a minor, in pretendence, under a regency council until 1972, when he took the regnal name "Irema-Ngoma I". His kingdom was officially abolished by the Ugandan government on 8 September 1967, but effectively continued in armed opposition until 15 August 1982, when the king's forces surrendered and Mumbere was officially appointed as "chief elder" of the district. Rwenzururu was officially restored by the government as a traditional kingdom on 17 March 2008, and recognition was confirmed by the President at the king's coronation anniversary on 19 October 2009.)	Abahira (Note: A clan of the Bakonzo.)	Hereditary	
Uganda	Toro	Omukama	Nyabongo I	12 September 2026	Babito	Hereditary	
Uganda Busoga confederates	Bugabula	Gabula	William Nadiope IV	11 February 1995	Kitimbo	Hereditary	
Uganda Busoga confederates	Bugweri	Menya	Frederick Kakaire II	11 February 1995	Menyha	Hereditary	
Uganda Busoga confederates	Bukooli	Wakooli	David Muluuya Kawunye	11 February 1995	Wakoli	Hereditary	
Uganda Busoga confederates	Bukono	Nkono	Mutyaba Nkono II	11 February 1995	Nkono	Hereditary	
Uganda Busoga confederates	Bulamogi	Zibondo	Edward Columbus Wambuzi	3 September 2008	Zibondo	Hereditary	
Uganda Busoga confederates	Bunya	Luba	Juma Munulo II	11 February 1995		Hereditary	
Uganda Busoga confederates	Bunyole	Nanyumba	John Ntale Nahnumba	11 February 1995		Hereditary	
Uganda Busoga confederates	Busiki	Kisiki	Yekosofato Kawanguzi	11 February 1995	Igaga	Hereditary	
Uganda Busoga confederates	Butembe	Ntembe	Badru Waguma	11 February 1995		Hereditary	
Uganda Busoga confederates	Kigulu	Ngobi	Izimba Golologolo	11 February 1995	Ngobi	Hereditary	
Uganda Busoga confederates	Luuka	Tabingwa	Willington Nabwana	11 February 1995	Tabingwa	Hereditary	
Zambia (Note: Under the 1996 Constitution, the government of Zambia recognises 286 chiefs, 54 senior chiefs and five paramount chiefs. The paramount chiefs are those of the Lozi, Bemba, Chewa, Ngoni, and Lunda peoples, all of which are listed in the table above. The remainder listed here are considered senior chiefs.)	Barotseland	Litunga	Lubosi II	October 2000	Aluyana (Note: A Lozi dynasty.)	Hereditary	
Zambia	Bemba	Chitimukulu ('King' or 'Paramount Chief')	Sosala Kanyanta Manga II		Bena Ng'andu	Hereditary and elective (Note: Succession to the throne of the chitimikulu is limited to male matrilineal members of the Bena Ng'andu. Tradition dictates that the throne passes to a son of the sisters of the previous chitimikulu. Selection is made by the royal Lamfya council.)	
Zambia	Chewa	His Majesty	Kalonga Gawa Undi Mkhomo V (Note: Born as Frederic Daka. His birth name, however, is no longer used.)	2 December 2004	Undi (Note: A sept of the Phiri clan.)	Hereditary and elective	
Zambia	Jere	Inkosi ya Makosi	Mpezeni IV (Note: Born as David Njengembaso Jere.)	1981	Ngoni	Hereditary and elective	
Zambia	Kazembe	Mwata	Kazembe XIX (Note: Born as Paul Mpemba Kanyembo Kapale Mpalume.)	1998	Lunda	Hereditary	
Zambia	Nkoya	Mwene	Kabulwebulwe VI Mukutabafu IV (Note: The current mwene is a queen.)	1994	Kabulwebulwe (Note: A sept of the Wushanga clan.)	Hereditary	
Zambia	Nkoya	Mwene	Kahare IX Kubama II	1994	Kahare	Hereditary	
Zambia	Nkoya	Mwene	Momba		Momba	Hereditary	
Zambia	Nkoya	Mwene	Mutondo XII	1993	Mutondo (Note: A sept of the Nawiko clan.)	Hereditary	
Zimbabwe	Mashonaland East		Musarurwa			Hereditary	
Zimbabwe	Masvingo		Fortune Charumbira			Hereditary	
Zimbabwe	Matabeleland North		Lukas Mtshane Khumalo			Hereditary	
Zimbabwe	Ndabazunduna		Ndiweni		Ndebele	Hereditary	

== Country notes ==
=== Cameroon ===
Cameroon's traditional authorities are split into first, second, and third degree chiefdoms. First degree chiefdoms contain at least two second degree chiefdoms, while second degree chiefdoms contain at least two third degree chiefdoms. Third degree chiefdoms generally contain only a village, small rural area or a small part of an urban centre. Some leaders are from ancient, pre-colonial lineages, while others are appointed by political leaders. The extent of authority between traditional authorities varies.

There are around 79 first degree chiefdoms, 875 second degree chiefdoms, and 12,582 third degree chiefdoms.

=== Ghana ===
The Constitution of the Republic of Ghana establishes the rule of traditional leaders, as well as a National House of Chiefs. All traditional leaders are registered with the National House of Chiefs as well as with the eleven Regional Houses of Chiefs, in accordance with the Chieftaincy (Membership of Regional Houses of Chiefs) Instrument, as published in the Gazette.

=== Nigeria ===
For a full list of the extant Nigerian traditional states and their rulers, see List of Nigerian traditional states.

Although Nigeria's traditional monarchs are legally recognized (by way of the numerous Chiefs' Laws), they do not currently have a constitutional role in the country.

=== South Africa ===
In 2004, the Mbeki administration established the Commission on Traditional Leadership Disputes and Claims (CTLDC) to determine the legitimacy of the nation's traditional kingships. The purpose of the commission was to reconstruct the institutions of indigenous leadership after their distortion under the colonial and apartheid regimes.

In July 2010, acting on the findings of the commission, the Zuma administration announced that the government would cease recognising a total of six of the thirteen traditional kingships upon the deaths of their incumbent monarchs. Their successors would be recognised as "principal traditional leaders", a status yet to be defined. The commission was denounced by several senior traditional leaders, who have taken the government to court in an attempt to reverse the ruling.

== See also ==
- African royalty (category)
- List of current constituent Asian monarchs
