= Hauts Plateaux =

Hauts Plateaux may refer to:

- Hauts-Plateaux, a department of Cameroon.
- The Central Highlands (Madagascar), a mountainous region of central Madagascar.
- The Hautes Plaines, a natural region of Algeria.
- The Central Highlands (Vietnam), one of the regions of Vietnam.
