= Baham, Cameroon =

Coordinates: 5°20′N 10°24′E

Baham
- Commune and town
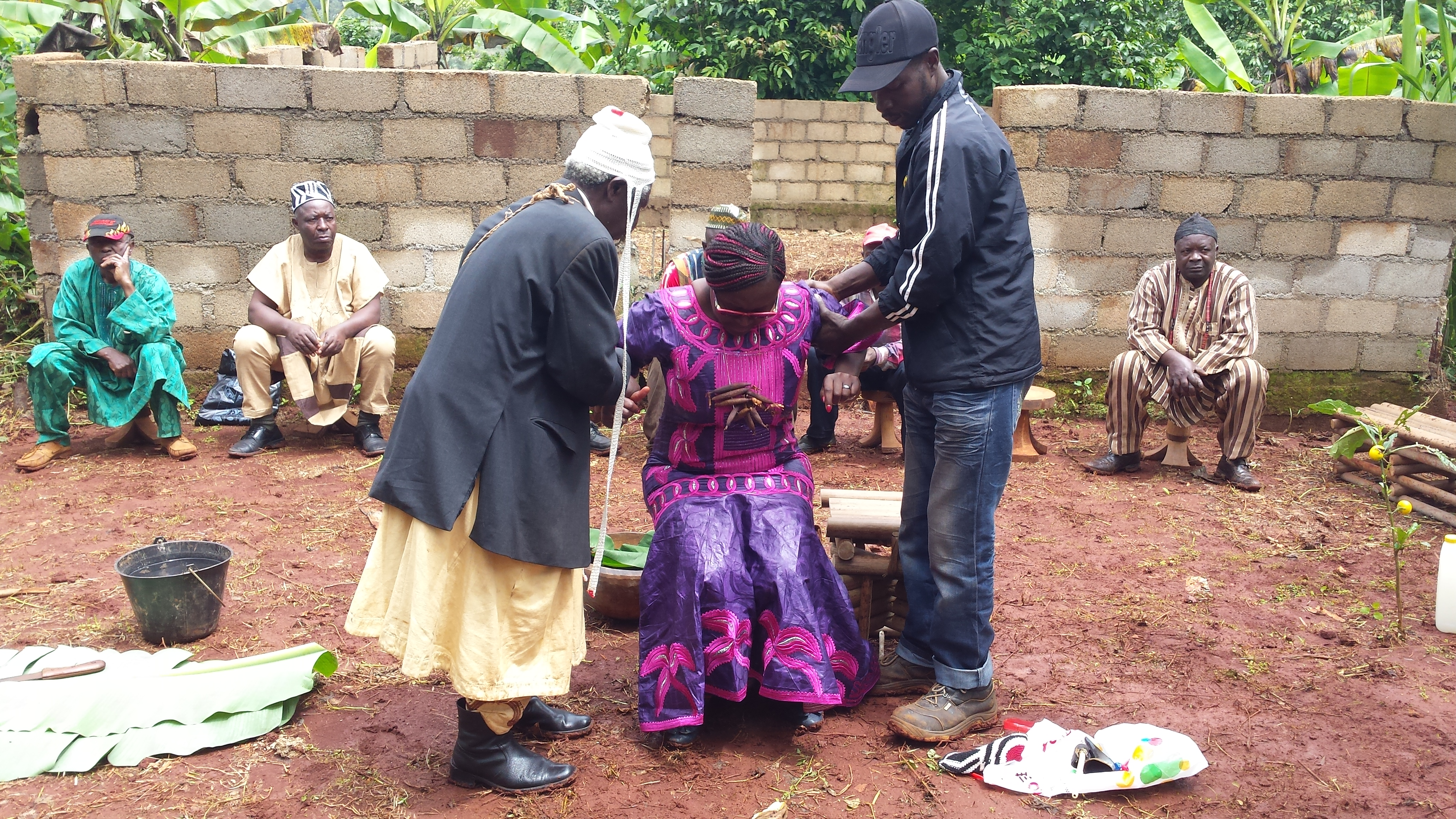
- Enthroning a Mafo'o
- Interactive map of Baham
- Country: Cameroon
- Region: Western Province
- Department: Hauts-Plateaux

Government
  - Mayor: Étienne Kenfack
- Elevation: 5,394 ft (1,644 m)

Population (2001)
  - Total: 51,500
- Time zone: UTC+1 (WAT)

Baham (Hom in the local language) is the seat of the Department of Hauts-Plateaux, in the Western Province of Cameroon. It also constitutes a traditional Bamileke chiefdom.

It is situated 250 km (155 mi) from Douala and 20 km (12 mi) from Bafoussam.

== Villages ==
Baham comprises 16 villages:

1. Boukue
2. Cheffou
3. Chengne
4. Demgo
5. Djemgheu
6. Hiala
7. Ho'o
8. Ka'a
9. Kaffo
10. La'agweu
11. Medjo
12. Ngouogoua
13. Pi'i
14. Pouomze
15. Souo
16. Wouom

Neighbouring villages are: Bandjoun, Bayangam, Bahouan, Bamendjou, Bapa, Batie, Badenkop, Bangou, and others.

== Language ==
The language spoken is Baham or Hom, a variant of ghomala', and belongs to the family of Bamiléké languages.

== See also ==
- Communes of Cameroon
