= Kaoma, Zambia =

Kaoma
- Town
- Location in Zambia
- Coordinates: 14°48′00″S 24°48′00″E
- Country: Zambia
- Province: Western Province
- District: Kaoma District
- Elevation: 3,763 ft (1,147 m)

Population
  - Total: 14,200
- Climate: Cwa

Kaoma is a town in Zambia. It is the headquarters of Kaoma District in the Western Province and is located on the M9 Road.

== History ==
Kaoma has previously been known by other names including: Nkoya, Mankoya, Mankoye, Nankoya, Nunkoya. The official name of the town was changed to Kaoma in 1964. The name Nkoya came from the first Zambian ethnic group to settle in the area around the 6th century. The Nkoya people can be found in Kaoma and the surrounding areas such as Mumbwa, Mulobezi, Kazungula, Mungulula (Mongu), Kalabo, Lukulu amongst other districts. The Nkoya people celebrate an annual traditional ceremony called the Kazanga Ceremony, which is held between April and August in Kaoma District, under Chief Mwene Mutondo and Chief Kahare of the Nkoya people.

== Population ==
In 2006, the population of Kaoma was estimated at 14,200. Kaoma is now divided into three districts namely Kaoma, Nkeyema and Luampa.

== Geography ==
=== Location ===
Kaoma is located approximately 460 kilometres (290 mi), by road, west of Lusaka, the capital of Zambia and its largest city. At Kaoma, the Lusaka-Mongu Road (M9), meets the Kaoma-Kasempa Road (D301). This location lies west of Kafue National Park. The coordinates of the town are: 14 48 00S, 24 48 00E (Latitude: -14.8000; Longitude: 24.8000).

=== Climate ===
Kaoma has a humid subtropical climate (Köppen: Cwa) characterized by warm to hot temperatures and clear wet and dry seasons. October and November are the hottest months, while June and July are the coolest months, having cool nights. The wet season, from November to March, experiences significant rainfall, while the dry season, from May to October, is marked by reduced precipitation.

Climate data for Kaoma (1991–2020)
Month	Jan	Feb	Mar	Apr	May	Jun	Jul	Aug	Sep	Oct	Nov	Dec	Year
Record high °C (°F)	35.2 (95.4)	35.0 (95.0)	39.1 (102.4)	38.5 (101.3)	34.6 (94.3)	38.5 (101.3)	33.2 (91.8)	36.7 (98.1)	39.4 (102.9)	39.6 (103.3)	39.2 (102.6)	39.0 (102.2)	37.3 (99.1)
Mean daily maximum °C (°F)	29.4 (84.9)	29.6 (85.3)	30.0 (86.0)	30.2 (86.4)	29.1 (84.4)	27.1 (80.8)	26.8 (80.2)	30.0 (86.0)	33.4 (92.1)	34.5 (94.1)	31.7 (89.1)	29.5 (85.1)	29.2 (84.6)
Daily mean °C (°F)	24.0 (75.2)	24.0 (75.2)	23.9 (75.0)	22.4 (72.3)	19.8 (67.6)	17.3 (63.1)	16.8 (62.2)	19.8 (67.6)	23.6 (74.5)	25.9 (78.6)	25.2 (77.4)	24.1 (75.4)	21.2 (70.2)
Mean daily minimum °C (°F)	18.5 (65.3)	18.4 (65.1)	17.8 (64.0)	14.5 (58.1)	10.5 (50.9)	7.4 (45.3)	6.8 (44.2)	9.5 (49.1)	13.8 (56.8)	17.3 (63.1)	18.6 (65.5)	18.6 (65.5)	13.3 (55.9)
Record low °C (°F)	14.8 (58.6)	14.3 (57.7)	10.5 (50.9)	7.5 (45.5)	2.5 (36.5)	0.4 (32.7)	0.7 (33.3)	1.1 (34.0)	4.3 (39.7)	0.1 (32.2)	12.5 (54.5)	11.9 (53.4)	6.7 (44.1)
Average precipitation mm (inches)	216.3 (8.52)	192.5 (7.58)	131.3 (5.17)	20.7 (0.81)	1.8 (0.07)	0.1 (0.00)	0.3 (0.01)	0.0 (0.0)	6.5 (0.26)	17.7 (0.70)	110.1 (4.33)	199.7 (7.86)	863.3 (33.99)
Source: NOAA

== Landmarks ==
The landmarks within the town of Kaoma or close to its borders include the following:

- The headquarters of Kaoma District Administration
- The offices of Kaoma Town Council
- A branch of Finance Bank Zambia Limited (FBZ)
- Kaoma Airport - A public, civilian airport, with one runway.
- Kaoma Farmers Market - The largest source of fresh produce in the town.
- Kaoma District Hospital - A public 100-bed hospital.
- Kaoma Cheshire Orphanage - An orphanage administered by the Irish charity, Touch Ireland. The orphanage takes care of an estimated 70 AIDS orphans, from birth to 4 years of age.
- Murals by Kozhi Kawina - This local artist has painted the murals on the walls of the district hospital, the doctors' residences and the Cheshire orphanage.
- The Kaoma Women's Center, located off Freedom Road near the main junction. The Women's Center provides high school and college scholarships, as well as vocational training and education for local women. It is a joint enterprise between the Kaoma WISE Trust and the American non-profit organization, Women's Initiatives that Strengthen and Empower.
- Maranatha Grassroots Institute is located in Mulammatila area on plot number 1637 Kahare Street. It is one of the most vibrant local NGO in Kaoma. The institute offers vocational skills training to youths. It also has a community library and is involved in various community services. The moral education department runs a music ministry called the Shalom Music Ministry.

== New district hospital ==
A new district hospital is under construction to replace the old buildings of the old hospital, which was constructed in the 1950s. Funding for the new hospital is through donations from overseas charitable organizations including:

- Foundation Medical Committee Kaoma, an initiative by donors from the Netherlands.
- TOUCH Ireland, a charitable organization based in the Republic of Ireland. - They will build the children's wing of the new hospital.
- Orange Babies, another charity based in the Netherlands - They will construct the women's wing of the new hospital.
- The hospital is still seeking new donors to complete the project.

== See also ==
- Lusaka
- Kasempa
- Mongu
- Great West Road, Zambia
