= Jean-Rameau Sokoudjou =

Camerounian tribal chief (born 1936)

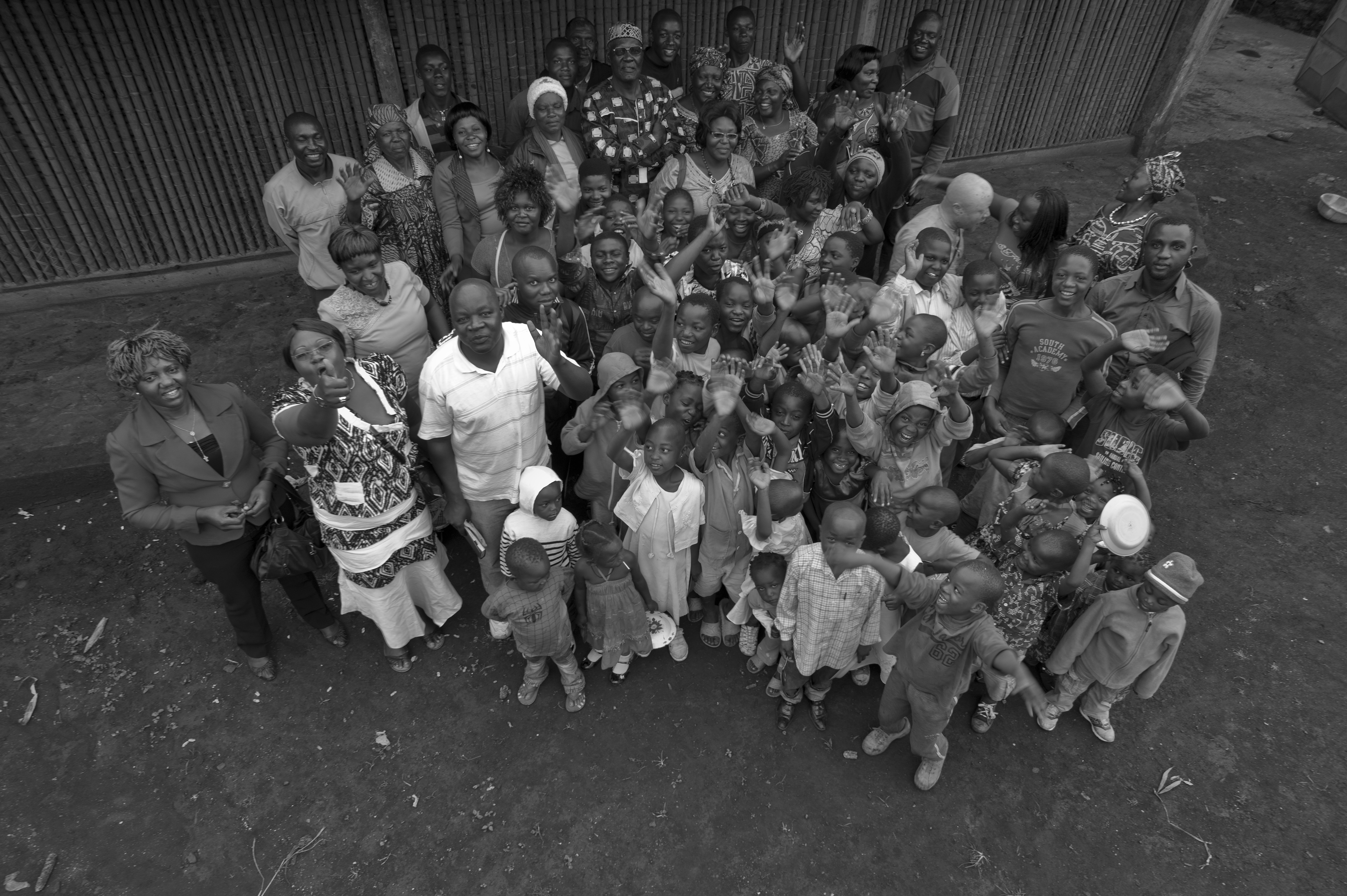
- Born: 1936 (age 89–90); Bamendjou, Cameroon
- Title: King of the Bamendjou

Jean-Rameau Sokoudjou (b. 1936) is a traditional chief of the Bamendjou people in Cameroon.

== Biography ==
=== Early life ===
Sokoudjou first entered chieftaincy aged 13 after inheriting the title from his father on 26 December 1953. From an early age, Sokoudjou has been passionate about agriculture. He left his homeland at an early age for southern Cameroon, where he lived before being chosen as chief. He learned Bulu from his adoptive family, whose patriarch entrusted him with the succession.

His service as both a traditional Bamiléké chief in western Cameroon and a patriarch in the region of Bulu, his adopted homeland, is often considered atypical.

He was incarcerated in Bafoussam, Dschang, Bafia, Yoko, Nanga Eboko, and Tchollirré, and was granted amnesty after being imprisoned in Yaoundé from 1959 to 1961.

On 13 August 1975, Sokoudjou was received by Pope Paul VI in Rome, where he requested for the canonisation of an African man who had sacrificed his life to save a member of the Catholic clergy.

=== Titles and political functions ===
Sokoudjou is the king of the Bamendjou people. He is a second-degree chief, the second highest rank in the traditional chieftaincy hierarchy in Cameroon. He assumes the role of guardian of the collection of religious and cultural objects of the Bamendjou kingdom. As part of his function, Sokoudjou receives visitors and has the capacity to bestow honours upon his subjects. He promotes the gathering of all inhabitants of the Bamendjou kingdom.Sokoudjou biennially organises Chepan, a Bamendjou cultural festival. In 2017, the festival was hosted in the palace donated by UNESCO and was attended by the Minister of Culture, Narcisse Mouelle Kombi.

== Public life ==
=== Political involvement ===
==== Pre-independence and during the Cameroon War ====
Sokoudjou refused to turn his chiefdom into a stronghold and relay station for the Cameroonian administration during the guerrilla war in the Bamiléké region.

Maurice Delauney, a French diplomat who would later become mayor of the city of Cannes, oversaw security in the Western Region after Jean-Marie Lamberton. Delauney built the Bangou internment camp, where he imprisoned Samuel Tanga Fouotsop, a senior Balatchi chief, along with his court and nine notables. With fewer resources than Jean-Marie Lamberton, he delegated part of the work against the resistance fighters to the traditional chiefs of the Bamiléké country and their servants, who were willing to cooperate and could settle scores with their adversaries. In this context, Joseph Kamga, chief of Bandjoun, was a loyalist and, like certain other chiefs, tied his fate to that of the administration.

Sokoudjou saw his chiefdom fall under occupation from November 1957 to June 1958 and his wives sexually assaulted by soldiers under French command.

==== Post-independence and presidency of Paul Biya ====
In 2020, he received visits by Cameroonian politicians and was administered a warning by the prefect of his department.

He allows the resistance fighters access to his land, which earns him the mistrust of the authorities in Yaoundé, whom he freely criticises. He is an advocate of anti-tribalism in Cameroon and, in particular, discrimination against the Bamileke ethnic group.

He freely gives his opinions on the management of Cameroonian political affairs and considers himself a "reformer."

Like many traditional chiefs in the Bamiléké region, he was a member of the board of directors of several local cooperative companies in the agribusiness sector.

=== Social advocacy ===
Sokoudjou advocates for the restitution of works of art, heritage objects such as the tangué, the cup-bearing queen, and several other artefacts looted from his palace during colonisation. He recounted the arson attack on his palace, which is considered as a common occurrence in the Bamiléké chiefdoms, almost all of which were burned down during the Cameroon War. Sokoudjou rebuilt the palace following the incident. He expressed his sorrow at seeing the power struggle between heirs after the death of Victor Fotso.

== Research contributions ==
Sokoudjou is regularly consulted for his opinions and experience.

In 2019, in collaboration with the Kadji production group, he shared details of his life with Jean-Bruno Tagne in view of the creation of a biography. The work includes a preface by Cardinal Christian Tumi, an afterword by the anthropologist Charly Gabriel Mbock, and has been reviewed by the press, such as media outlets Le Jour and Canal 2 International.

The anthropologists Jean-Paul Fotué and Louis Perrois have consulted Sokoudjou for their work on secret societies in the Bamiléké kingdoms. Several other researchers and doctoral students draw on his recollections.

Philippe Niorthe, a photographer who visited Cameroon to interview witnesses of the arson attack in the Congo district of Douala on 24 April 1960, consulted Sokoudjou about the murders of activists affiliated to the Union of the Peoples of Cameroon (UPC) in the Métché Falls, which Sokoudjou himself had escaped.

== See also ==
- Bamileke people
- Bamendjou
