= List of rulers of the Yoruba state of Ketu =

The traditional state of Ketu is a historical Yoruba kingdom located in Present-day parts of southwestern Nigeria and southeast Republic of Benin.

In the Yoruba language, the word Oba means king or ruler. It is also common for the rulers of the various Yoruba domains to have their own special titles. In Ketu the Oba is referred to as the Aleketu of Ketu

== List of Kings of The Kingdom of Ketu ==
Fifty sovereigns have succeeded one another at the traditional head of Kétou since its establishment in Aro. The 51st, Oba Adedun Loyé, was presented to the population on Sunday the 25th of March, 2018 after the completion of the rites of enthronement.

Kétou was ruled by two regents during its history: Agidigbo Hungbo (1883 - 1886), then Alaba Ida, a woman (1893 - 1894).

#	Name	Parentage	Royal Line	Period
Before arriving at the current site of Ketu (Aro)
1	Şopasan	Paluku & Olu-wunku		
2	Owe	Adeyomu & Asebi		
3	Ajoje	Ademunle & Odere		
4	Ija	(Unknown) & Ofinran		
5	Erankikan	Adebiyi & Oju		
6	Agbo (Agbo I)	Adekambi & Oliji		
Kings in ile Ketu (current site)
7	Ede	Parents unknown		
8	Okoyi	Atonsi & Oniyi		
9	Esu	Aro-bada-Isa & Agba		
10	Apanhum	Adunu & Awopa		
11	Daro	Anepo & Orere		
12	Ogo	Adimu & Asanu	Alapini	
13	Agbo (Agbo II)	Ajido & Oduola		
14	Sa	Aguro & Asabi		
15	Epo	Lilaja & Iroku		
16	Ajina	Asubo & Abesu		
17	Ara	Akambi & Ofere		
18	Odiyi Koyenikan	Parents unknown		
19	Olukadun	Adekambi & Ajaro		
20	Arugbo	Ajagbe & Ijaku		
21	Odun	Atiṣe & Ajọkẹ		
22	Tete	Ajido & Adufẹ		
23	Ajiboyede	Iroro & Awẹle		
24	Arowojoye	Akọni & Kobolu		
25	Epo Otudi	Ọmọwoye & Ajini	Mesa	
26	Etu	Ondofoyi & Awopẹ	Mefu	
27	Ekoshoni	Agbaka & Abero	Alapini	
28	Emuwagun	Adisa & Aṣakẹ	Magbo	
29	Asunu	Aṣotan & Iyamo	Aro	
30	Agodogbo	Ileju & Asabo	Mesa	
31	Agasu	Ajagbe & Ayinke	Mefu	
32	Orubu	Aṣuloye & Agbekẹ	Alapini	
33	Ileke	Adike & Koraye	Magbo	
34	Ebo	Adiro & Anikẹ	Aro	
35	Osuyi	Akande & Aṣakẹ	Mesa	
36	Oniyi	Ojugbele & Abẹṣe	Mefu	
37	Abiri	Aṣotan & Awẹle	Alapini	
38	Oje	(Father unknown) & Ilufẹ	Unknown	1748 - 1760
39	Ande	Adeyi & (Mother unknown)	Magbo	1760 - 1780
40	Akebioru	Ibajȩ & (Mother unknown)	Aro	1780 - 1795
41	Ajibolu	Orubu & Aṣabi	Mesa	1795 - 1816
42	Adebiya	Orubu & Adubo	Mefu	1816 - 1853
43	Adegbede	Asunu & Owuaji	Alapini	1855 - 1858
44	Adiro	Obaleke & Obasi	Magbo	1858 - 1867
45	Ojẹku	(Father unknown) & Wenfolu	Aro	1867 - 1883
46	Oyingin	Abido & Oluwofe	Mesa	1894 - 1918
47	Ademufẹkun	Odewena & IlemQle	Mefu	1918 - 1936
48	Adegbitȩ	Ogun & Alaye	Alapini	1937 - 1963
49	Adetutu		Magbo	1965 - 2002
50	Aladé Ifè		Aro	2005 - 2018
51	Adedun Loyé		Mesa	2018 -

Tenure	Incumbent	Notes
c.	Capital moved to Ketu	
1795 to 1816	Ajibolu, Oba	
1816 to 1853	Adebiya, Oba	
1853 to December 1858	Adegbede, Oba	
December 1858 to 1867	Adiro, Oba	
1867 to 1883	Osun Ojeku, Oba	
1883 to 1886	Agidigbo Hungbo, regent	
1886	Conquest by Danhome	
1893 to 1894	Alaba Ida, regent	♀
13 February 1894 to 1918	Oyengen, Oba	
1918 to 1936	Ademufekun Dudu, Oba	
1937 to 1963	Alamu Adewori Adegibite, Oba	
23 January 1964 to 2004	Oba Pascal Adeoti Adetutu Oba	
17 December 2005 to 2018	Oba Alaro Alade-Ife Oba	
27 July 2019 to present	Oba Anicet Adesina, Akanni Adedunloye Aderomola Oba	

== See also ==
- List of rulers of the Yoruba state of Dassa
- List of rulers of the Yoruba state of Icha
- List of rulers of the Yoruba state of Oyo
- List of rulers of the Yoruba state of Sabe
- Lists of office-holders
