= Momba, Zambia =

Momba was a Nkoya kingdom in what is today known as the Kalomo District of Zambia.

== See also ==
- Kabulwebulwe
- Kahare
- Mombas
- Mutondo
