= Kabulwebulwe =

Former Nkoya kingdom

Kabulwebulwe was a Nkoya kingdom in what is today Mumbwa District, Zambia.

== See also ==
- Kahare
- Momba, Zambia
- Mutondo
