= Egba Kotan II =

Yoruba ruler from Benin

Egba Kotan II is the king of the Yoruba State of Dassa in central Benin. The king rose to the throne on March 3, 2002.

== See also ==
- List of rulers of the Yoruba state of Dassa
- List of current non-sovereign African monarchs
