= List of rulers of the Yoruba state of Icha =

Territory located in present-day Benin.

Tenure	Incumbent	Notes
c.	Foundation of Icha state	
???? to ????	Baba Akete	
???? to ????	Lauru	
???? to ????	Obinti	
???? to ????	Akan Aku	
???? to ????	Kase Kpe	
???? to ????	Lauru Tofa	
???? to ????	Lauru Tonyon	
???? to ????	Lauro Bezon	
???? to ????	Lauru Asogba	
ante/post1920 to ante/post1920	Lauru	

== Sources ==
- Official website

== See also ==
- Benin
  - Yoruba states
    - List of rulers of the Yoruba state of Dassa
    - List of rulers of the Yoruba state of Ketu
    - List of rulers of the Yoruba state of Oyo
    - List of rulers of the Yoruba state of Sabe
- Lists of office-holders
