= Kaoma Airport =

Airport in Zambia

- IATA: KMZ; ICAO: FLKO

Summary
- Airport type: Public
- Serves: Kaoma, Zambia
- Elevation AMSL: 3,670 ft / 1,119 m
- Coordinates: 14°47′50″S 24°48′30″E

Map
- Location of the airport in Zambia

Runways
Direction	Length		Surface
Direction	m	ft	Surface
11/29	1,311	4,301	Dirt
- Source: GCM Google Maps

Kaoma Airport (IATA: KMZ, ICAO: FLKO) is an airport serving Kaoma, Western Province, Zambia. The airport is within the northern section of the city.

== See also ==
- Transport in Zambia
- List of airports in Zambia
