= Mutondo =

Nkoya kingdom in Zambia

Mutondo was a Nkoya kingdom in what is today Kaoma District, Zambia.

== See also ==
- Kabulwebulwe
- Kahare
- Momba, Zambia
