= List of rulers of the Yoruba state of Sabe =

Sabe is a territory located in present-day Benin, based in and around the town of Savé

In the Yoruba language, the word Oba means king or ruler. It is also common for the obas of the various Yoruba domains to have their own special titles. In Sabe the Oba is referred to as the Onisabe of Sabe

Records for Sabe are fragmentary and conflicting, containing a long succession of rulers styled Ola and Oba. It is suggested by one source that recent rulers alternate between descendants of either of two brothers.

The list presented here represents the official record kept by the traditional authorities of Sabe.

== List of Rulers of the Yoruba state of Sabe ==
Tenure	Incumbent	Notes
1738 to 1765	Ola Obe, Onisabe	
1769 to 1796	Ola Monen, Onisabe	
1798 to 1825	Oba Akikenju, Onisabe	
1852 to 1860	Oba Otewa, Onisabe	
1881 to 1887	Oba Alamu, Onisabe	
1888 to 1925	Oba Akenmu, Onisabe	
1926 to 1933	Oba Adegboye, Onisabe	
1935 to 1946	Oba Adeyemi, Onisabe	
1946 to 1963	Oba Ademoyegun, Onisabe	
1964 to 1968	Oba Adegeriolu, Onisabe	
1971 to 1973	Oba Adegbamife, Onisabe	
1975 to 2005	Oba Adeleke, Onisabe	
2005 to ------	Oba Adetutu Akenmu, Onisabe	

== Sources ==
- http://www.rulers.org/benitrad.html
- Montserrat Palau Martí. L'histoire de Ṣàbẹ́ et de ses rois : République du Bénin (Les Ṣàbẹ́-Ọpara) (French Edition) Paperback – January 1, 1992

== See also ==
- Benin
  - Yoruba states
    - List of rulers of the Yoruba state of Dassa
    - List of rulers of the Yoruba state of Icha
    - List of rulers of the Yoruba state of Ketu
    - List of rulers of the Yoruba state of Oyo
- Lists of office-holders
