= Sumanoh Kapen =

Sierra Leonean politician

Somanoh Kapen

Chairman and leader of the Sierra Leone People's Party
- Incumbent
- Assumed office 2013
- Preceded by: John Oponjo Benjamin

Paramount chief of Mambolo Chiefdom, Kambia District
- In office 1989–2010

Personal details
- Born: Alhaji Bai Sebora Somanoh Kapen III; August 1943 (age 83) Mambolo Chiefdom, Kambia District, Sierra Leone
- Party: Sierra Leone People's Party (SLPP)
- Education: Fourah Bay College1964-67 University of Durham

Chief Alhaji Bai Sebora Somanoh Kapen III, commonly known as Chief Somanoh Kapen, is a Sierra Leonean politician who has been chairman and leader of Sierra Leone's main opposition party, the Sierra Leone People's Party (SLPP), since 2013. Previously he was paramount chief of Mambolo Chiefdom in Kambia District.

He served as Paramount Chief of Mambolo Chiefdom in Kambia District from 1989 until his resignation in 2010. In 2011, he was elected deputy leader of the SLPP party.

Chief Kapen was elected chairman and leader of the SLPP at the party's 2013 convention held in the southern city of Bo, defeating his closest rival, former Ambassador to Ghana Alie Bangura, in a close race for the SLPP leadership position.

Chief Kapen is a devout Muslim and a member of the Temne ethnic group from Kambia District in northern Sierra Leone.
