= List of rulers of Nkhamanga =

List of Rulers "Chikulamayembe" of Nkhamanga (in Malawi):

Term	Incumbent	Notes
c.1795	Foundation of Nkamanga state
?to ?	Gonapamuhanya (a.k.a. Nkhalapamuhanya), Chikulamayembe
?to ?	Kampungu, Chikulamayembe
?to ?	Pitamkusa, Chikulamayembe
?to ?	Bwati I, Chikulamayembe	Originally Cayeka
?to ?	Bwati II, Chikulamayembe
?to ?	Bamantha, Chikulamayembe
18?? to 1855	Mkuwayira, Chikulamayembe
1855 to 18??	Interregnum
18?? To 1880	Mujuma, Chikulamayembe
1880 to 1907	Interregnum
1907 to 1931	Chilongozi (Mbawuwo Mgonanjerwa Gondwe)	Themba la mathemba, paramount chief for the whole Tumbukaland. He was the first colonial Chikulamayembe after the restoration of the dynasty. Witnesses of the coronation were Mayelele Gondwe, Hunga Bongololo Gondwe, Juwaunini, Magomero Chaula, Chitupila Gondwe and Mkundajalamapiri and the District Commissioner for Koronga.
1932 to 1977	Ziwange (John Hardy Gondwe)
1977	Walter Gondwe
