= Togbega Gabusu VI =

Fiaga of the Gbi Traditional Area (1950–2020)

His Royal Highness Togbega Gabusu VI was the Fiaga (Paramount Chief) of the Gbi Traditional Area in Ghana. The Gbi Traditional Area is popularly known as the Hohoe Area with Hohoe, its capital town, doubling as the municipal capital. The area is also sometimes referred to as Gbi Dzigbe.

== Background ==
He was known in private life as Billy Bright Eli Komla Kumadie and was born on 20 June 1950, to Gustav Koku Kumadie of Gbi-Hohoe and Dorothea Kpegah of Gbi-Bla.

He comes from the Royal Kadrake Gate of the Torkoni clan of Gbi-Hohoe.

== Career ==
A teacher by profession, he ascended the Gabusu throne on 25 May 1989, and by tradition became the Chief of Torkoni Clan and the divisional Chief of Gbi-Hohoe as well.

Togbega Gabusu VI was the president of the Volta Regional House of Chiefs from the year 2000 to 2008; and as such was automatically a member of the National House of Chiefs for the same period.

== Death ==
His death was announced by the Gbi Traditional Council on 18 January 2020.
