= Hauts-Plateaux =

Department of West Province, Cameroon

- Department
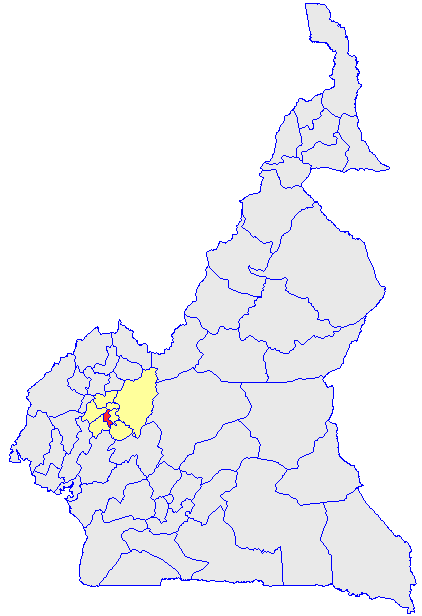
- Department location in Cameroon

- Location within Cameroon Location within Africa
- Country: Cameroon
- Province: West Province
- Capital: Baham

Government
  - Governor: Henri Djientcheu
  - Deputy Governor: Julien Nkamleu

Area
  - Total: 160 sq mi (415 km^{2})

Population (2019)
  - Total: 83,000
- Time zone: UTC+1 (WAT)

Hauts-Plateaux is a department of West Province in Cameroon. The department covers an area of 415 km^{2} and as of 2005 had a total population of 80,678. The capital of the department lies at Baham. The department was created in 1995 when the Mifi department was split up.

== Subdivisions ==
The department is divided administratively into 4 communes and in turn into villages.

=== Communes ===
- Baham
- Bamendjou
- Bangou
- Batié
