= Alaba Ida =

Ruler in colonial Kétu

- Born: c. 1854; Ketu people
- Died: 1938 (aged 83–84)
- Spouse(s): Alákétu Ojeku, Alákétu Onyegen

Alaba Ida (c. 1854 – 1938) was a female ruler in the kingdom of Kétu during the French colonial period.

Alaba Aduké was born around 1854 in Kétu. She became an aya ọba (royal wife) of the Alákétu (king) of Kétu, Ojeku. She had a son and a daughter.

In 1886, Kétu was conquered by Dahomey. Ojeku was killed and Alaba was one of the many Kétu captives enslaved and brought to Abomey, Dahomey's capital. Following France's victory in the Second Franco-Dahomean War, France returned the captives to Kétu and restored it as a political entity. The new Alákétu, Onyegen, by custom took all the wives of the previous ruler, including Alaba. Alaba became the ida (senior wife) of the king, an important and powerful position.

Alaba Ida was a staunch supporter of the French. After Onyegen went blind, Alaba gained more influence and power. In 1911, the French named Alaba and another woman, Yá Sègén, as intermediaries between them and the people of Kétu. The French translated ida as queen and referred to her as "Queen Ida". While she was never officially named such, she acted as de facto canton chief responsible for conscription and taxation. As a result, she was the target of people's ire at French demands and there were several attempts on her life. In 1917, the French removed her from power.

Alaba Ida is remembered quite negatively and was the subject of songs that denounced her rule. However, she was also blamed for deaths due to illness and much of the ire seems to have been motivated by the fact that she was a woman in a position of power.

Alaba Ida died destitute in 1938 in the village of Irocogny.
