= List of rulers of Hogbonu (Porto-Novo) =

Territory located in present-day Benin.

Later known as Ajache Ipo or Ajashe (Adjatshe/Adjatché).

Ahosu = King.

Tenure	Incumbent	Notes
Hogbonu Kingdom Division of Allada royal family
Agasuvi Dynasty (Alada-tadonu or Hwegbonu Dynasty)
1688 to 1729	Té-Agbanlin, Ahosu	
1729 to 1739	Hiakpon, Ahosu	
1739 to 1746	Lokpon, Ahosu	
1746 to 1752	Hude, Queen	
1752 to 1757	Messe, Ahosu (Messi)	
1757 to 1761	Huyi, Ahosu	
1761 to 1765	Gbeyon, Ahosu	
1765 to 1775	Interregnum	
1775 to 1783	Ayikpe, Ahosu	
1783 to 1794	Ayaton, Ahosu	
Ajache Ipo Kingdom
1794 to 1807	Huffon, Ahosu	
1807 to 1816	Ajohan, Ahosu	
1816 to 1818	Toyi, Ahosu	
1818 to 1828	Hueze, Ahosu	
1828 to 1836	Toyon, Ahosu	
1836 to 8 September 1848	Meyi, Ahosu	
8 September 1848 to 3 February 1864	Sodji, Ahosu	
11 February 1864 to 23 May 1872	Mikpon, Ahosu	
4 June 1872 to 26 June 1874	Messi, Ahosu (Messi II)	
16 September 1874 to 7 February 1908	Toffa I, Ahosu (Tofa II)	
French annexation
7 February 1908 to 22 October 1913	Gbdessin, Chef supérieur	
1913 to 1929	Hudji, Chef supérieur	
1929 to 1930	Toli, Chef supérieur	
1930 to 1940	Gbehinto, Chef supérieur	
1941 to 1946	Gbesso Toyi, Chef supérieur	
1946 to 16 July 1976	Alohinto Gbeffa, Chef supérieur	

== Sources ==
- https://www.rulers.org/benitrad.html
- Stewart, John (18 October 2024). African States and Rulers (3 ed.). McFarland. p. 183. ISBN 978-1-4766-1707-7.

== See also ==
- Benin
  - Heads of Government of Benin
  - Colonial Heads of Benin (Dahomey)
- Lists of office-holders
