= Kahare =

Kahare was a Nkoya kingdom in what is today Kasempa District, Zambia. The kingdom was likely conquered at some point in the 1890s.

== See also ==
- Kabulwebulwe
- Momba, Zambia
- Mutondo
