= Swartbooi =

Surname list

Swartbooi is a Namibian surname. Notable people with the surname include:

- Bernadus Swartbooi (born 1977), politician
- Levis Swartbooi (born 1984), footballer
- Luketz Swartbooi (born 1966), long-distance runner
