= Bamendjou =

Coordinates: 5°24′N 10°19′E

- Commune and town
- Nickname: MUDJOUO
- Interactive map of Bamendjou
- Country: Cameroon
- Region: West Region
- Department: Hauts-Plateaux
- Established: 1962

Government mayor Mukam Emmanuel

Area
  - Total: 260 km^{2} (100 sq mi)

Population
  - Total: 37 547 inhabitants
- Time zone: UTC+1 (WAT)
- Climate: Cwb

Bamendjou is a town and commune in the west of Cameroon that extends over approximately 260 square kilometres.

It adjoins Baham, Bahouan, Batié, Bansoa, Bayangam, Bameka, and Bandjoun.

Its traditional leader is the Fo'o (King) of Bamendjou.

== See also ==
- Communes of Cameroon
