= Kaoma District =

Coordinates: 14°50′S 24°40′E

- District
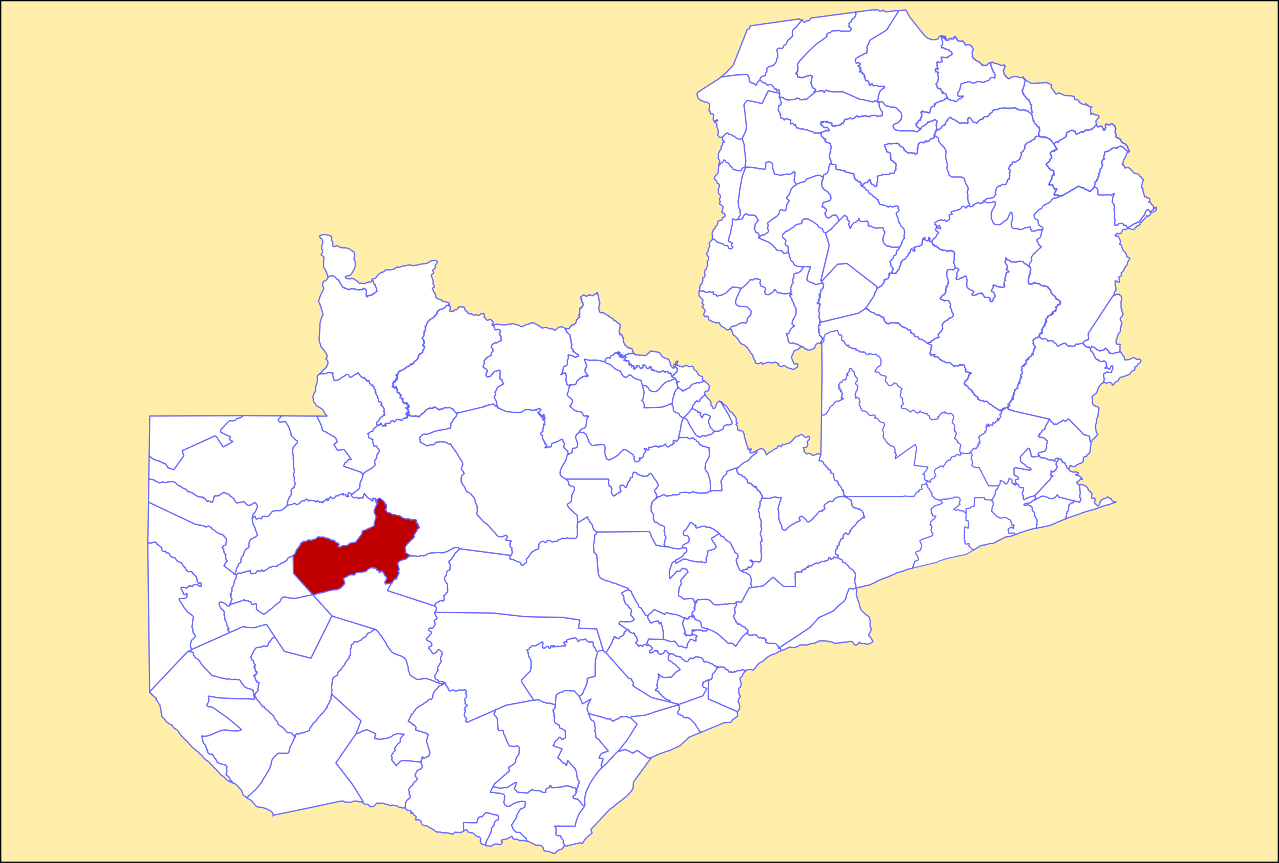
- District location in Zambia
- Country: Zambia
- Province: Western Province
- Capital: Kaoma

Area
  - Total: 8,403.8 km^{2} (3,244.7 sq mi)

Population (2022)
  - Total: 146,690
  - Density: 17.455/km^{2} (45.209/sq mi)
- Time zone: UTC+2 (CAT)

Kaoma District with headquarters at Kaoma, Zambia is located in the north-eastern corner of Western Province. As of the 2022 Zambian Census, the district had a population of 146,690 people. The population lives mainly around Kaoma town and the northern parts of the district along the Luena and Luampa rivers. Its south-western portion is relatively uninhabited being very sandy with little water available in the dry season.

It consists of two constituencies, namely Kaoma Central and Mangango.
