= List of rulers of the Yoruba state of Dassa =

This is a list of rulers of the kingdom of Dassa, a territory located in present-day Benin.

The Kingdom of Dassa was founded around 1600. Around 1800, Dahomey won it in a conquest. In 1889, it became independent of Dahomey, but was placed under a French protectorate.

Oba = Ruler.

Tenure	Incumbent	Historical era	Notes
c.1600	Foundation of Dassa kingdom		
c.1800	Conquest by Danhome		
1889	French protectorate independent of Danhome		
c. 1600 – ????	Origi, Oba		
	Araye, Oba		
	Okemou, Oba		
	Oyoubo, Oba		
	Agou, Oba		
	Osoy, Oba		
	Araka, Oba		
	Kinyoun, Oba		
	Nana, Oba		
	Ojo, Oba		
	Egba Kotan I, Oba		
	Sokoti, Oba		
	Arisi, Oba		
???? – 1889	Amoro, Oba	French West Africa (France)	
1889 – ????	Ajikin Zomaw, Oba	French West Africa (France)	
???? – 1941	Abisi Oyo, Oba	French West Africa (France)	
13 June 1941 – 24 July 1942	Awo Alagi, Oba	French West Africa (France)	
1942 – ????	Bernardin Zomaw, Oba	French West Africa (France)	
3 March 2002 – ????	Egba Kotan II, Oba	Republic of Benin	
c. 2023 –	Djagou Afoman Egbakokou II, Oba	Republic of Benin	

== Sources ==
- rulers.org/benitrad
- https://www.worldstatesmen.org/Benin_native.html

== See also ==
- Benin
  - Yoruba states
    - Rulers of the Yoruba state of Icha
    - Rulers of the Yoruba state of Ketu
    - Rulers of the Yoruba state of Sabe
    - Rulers of the Yoruba state of Oyo
- Lists of office-holders
