= Witbooi =

Witbooi is an Afrikaans and Khoekhoe surname, common in Namibia and South Africa. Notable people with the surname include:

- Hendrik Witbooi, Nama leader
- Hendrik Samuel Witbooi, Oorlam Kaptein
- Hendrik Witbooi (politician), former deputy prime minister of Namibia
- Lucia Witbooi, Namibian politician
- Ryan Witbooi, Namibian rugby player
- Emile Witbooi, South African soccer player

== See also ==
- Geronay Whitebooi, South African judoka
