= Dein =

Dein is a surname. Notable people with the surname include:

- Dick Dein (1889–1969), Australian politician
- David Dein (born 1943), former vice-chairman of Arsenal Football Club and the Football Association
- Gavin Dein, the founder and CEO of Reward (company), a loyalty programme management company

== See also ==
- Dein Perry, Australian actor, dancer and choreographer best known for his work with Tap Dogs
