= Chef supérieur =

Chef supérieur, literally 'superior chief', was an official title in French, used by European (notably French and Belgian) colonial authorities to classify native chiefs whose tribal position were thus considered as higher than those of other tribal chiefs. There are no fixed rules for correspondence with the usually pre-existent native rapport.

== Cases in French colonies ==
(this list is probably very incomplete)

- in Dahomey (present Benin) : in Alada, since 1909, as colonial style of the native dynasty, styled Ajahutonon or Alada hosu after the annexation of their former Fon kingdom
- in Togo : the Togbé Ahuawoto (still of the Lawson family) of Lolan

== See also ==
Similar titles in English are

- High Chief
- Paramount Chief.
