= Batié, Cameroon =

Batié
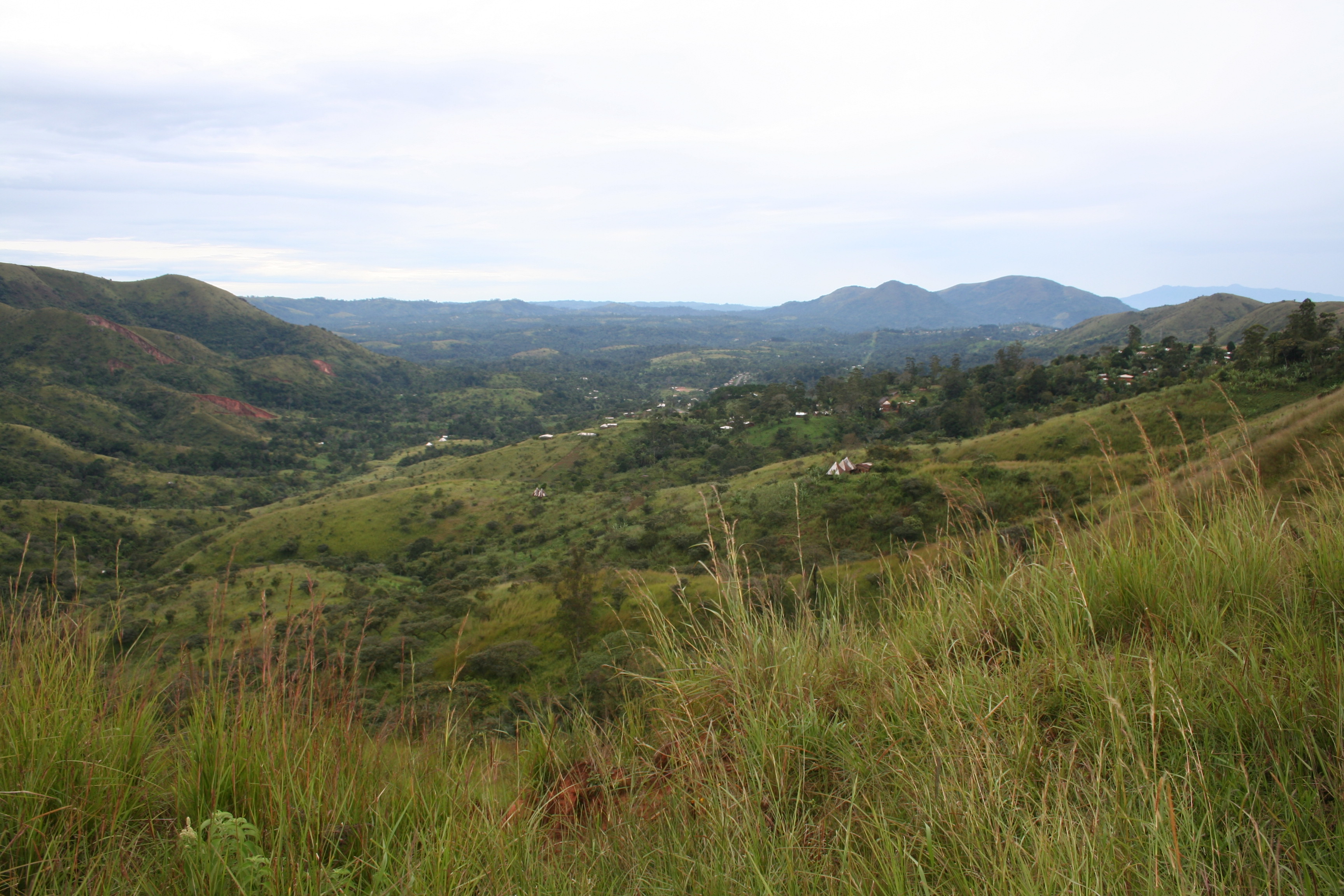
- Batié landscape

- Location in Cameroon
- Coordinates: 5°17′N 10°17′E
- Country: Cameroon
- Region: West
- Division: Hauts-Plateaux

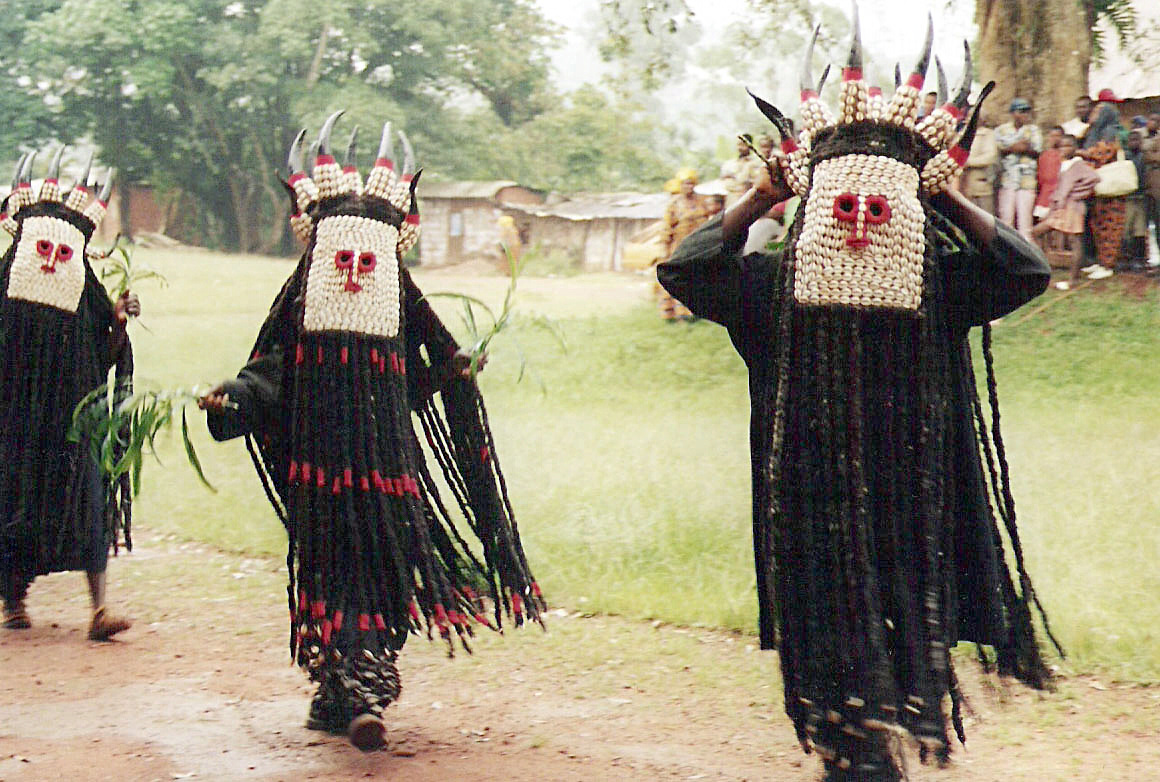
Danseurs Batie

Batié is a town and municipality in the Hauts Plateaux Division in western Cameroon. It is located at latitude 5.283333 and longitude 10.28333. Batié is known for its association football club Sable FC, the "San San Boys", named after the sand production in this mountainous region. The climate in Batié is very mild. The rainy season typically lasts from March through October. The dry season begins in November and goes into March of the following year.

The closest major city is the provincial capital of the West province, Bafoussam. The village is located on one of the few paved roads (N5) in Cameroon. This two-lane highway connects Bafoussam, to the economic capital of Cameroon, Douala. The N5 cuts across the village and forms two areas of congregation. One is the carrefour and the other is le marché. Le marché is the local market that follows the traditional calendar and occurs every 8 days.

== Transportation ==
Since Batié is located on a paved road, travelling to neighbouring villages is relatively easy. Below is a list of prices via local transportation and the time that it would take. (c. 2010 prices)

- Batié - Baham: 15 min in a taxi (400CFA)
- Batié – Bamenjou: 20 min on a moto (700CFA)
- Batié - Bafoussam: 30 min in a taxi (600CFA)
- Bafoussam – Bagangté: an hour in a taxi (500CFA)
- Bafoussam – Dschang: an hour in a taxi (500CFA)
- Bafoussam – Bamenda: 90 min in a taxi (1200CFA)
- Bafoussam – Foumbot: 30 min in a taxi (600CFA)
- Bafoussam – Foumban: 45 min in taxi (800CFA)
- Bafoussam – Yaoundé: 5 hours in bus, (4500CFA)

The taxi described here is a typical "bush taxi" where up to 8 people would ride in a 4-person sedan from one to two decades ago.

== Peace Corps ==
Peace Corps Cameroon had a training center in Batié in the 1980s, and has had a series of volunteers in the community. Round II: Cameroon chronicles a Small Enterprise Development volunteer in Batié from 2008–2010.

== Notable people ==
- Francis Ngannou, professional boxer and mixed martial artist, former UFC Heavyweight Champion
- Noelle Kenmoe, renowned movie actress and producer

== AEDEBA ==
By the law n ° 90-53 of December 19, 1990, relating to the freedom of association, a non-political nonprofit association called "ASSOCIATION OF ELITE FOR THE SUPPORT TO THE DEVELOPMENT OF BATIE" (French: “ASSOCIATION DES ÉLITES POUR APPUI AU DÉVELOPPEMENT DE BATIE” abbreviated "AEADEBA") was created.

Considering the resolution adopted at the Congress of May 26, 2018 setting new directions for its actions, the AEDEBA is now the Association of Elites for Development Support Batié (French: l'Association des Elites pour Appui au Développement de Batié, abbreviated AEDEBA).
