= Nkoya people =

Indigenous Bantu group in Zambia

The Nkoya (also Shinkoya) people are a Bantu people native to Zambia, living mostly in the Western and Southern provinces, North Western Province, Central, Copperbelt and the Mankoya area. As of 2006, they were estimated to number 946,000 people in Western Province alone, though other dialects have not been counted especially those in other provinces.

Besides Nkoya proper, Nkoya dialects include Ba Mbowela (Mbwela, Mbwera, Shimbwera), Ba Lushange, Ba Lukolwe, Mashasha.
