= Cobly =

- Commune, arrondissement and town
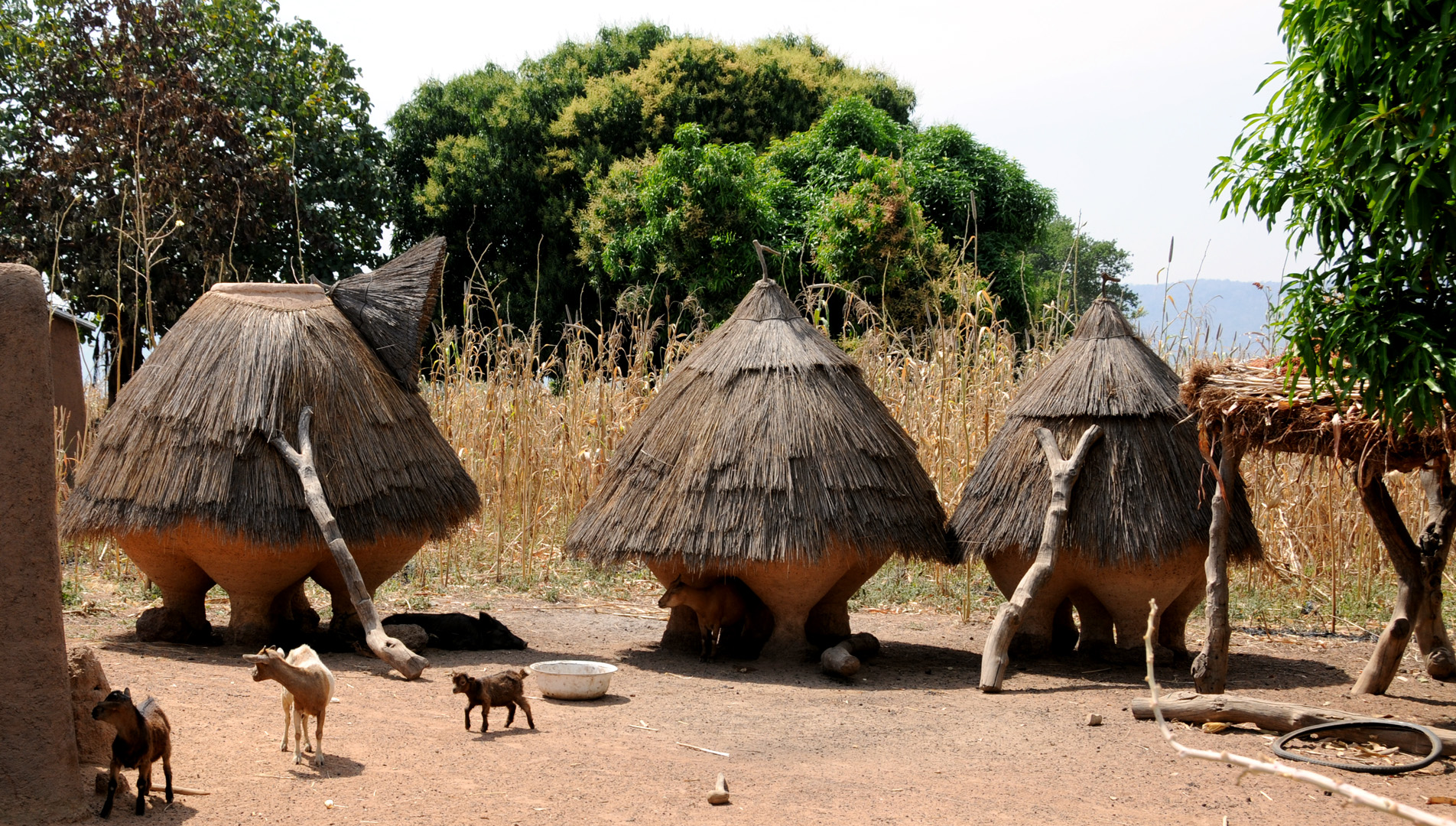

- Location in Benin
- Coordinates: 10°29′32″N 0°59′59″E
- Country: Benin
- Department: Atakora Department

Area
  - Total: 825 km^{2} (319 sq mi)

Population (2013)
  - Total: 67,603
  - Density: 81.9/km^{2} (212/sq mi)
- Time zone: UTC+1 (WAT)

Cobly or Kobli [kɔb.li] is a town, arrondissement and commune in the Atakora Department of north-western Benin.

The commune covers an area of 825 square kilometres and as of 2013 had a population of 67,603 people.

== Geography ==
The town of Cobly is located 645 kilometres from Cotonou and 106 kilometres from the department capital of Natitingou. Communally it is bounded to the north by Matéri, south by Boukoumbé, west by Togo and east by Tanguiéta.

== Administrative divisions ==
Cobly is subdivided into 4 arrondissements; Cobly, Datori, Kountori and Tapoga. They contain 17 villages and 9 urban districts.

== Economy ==
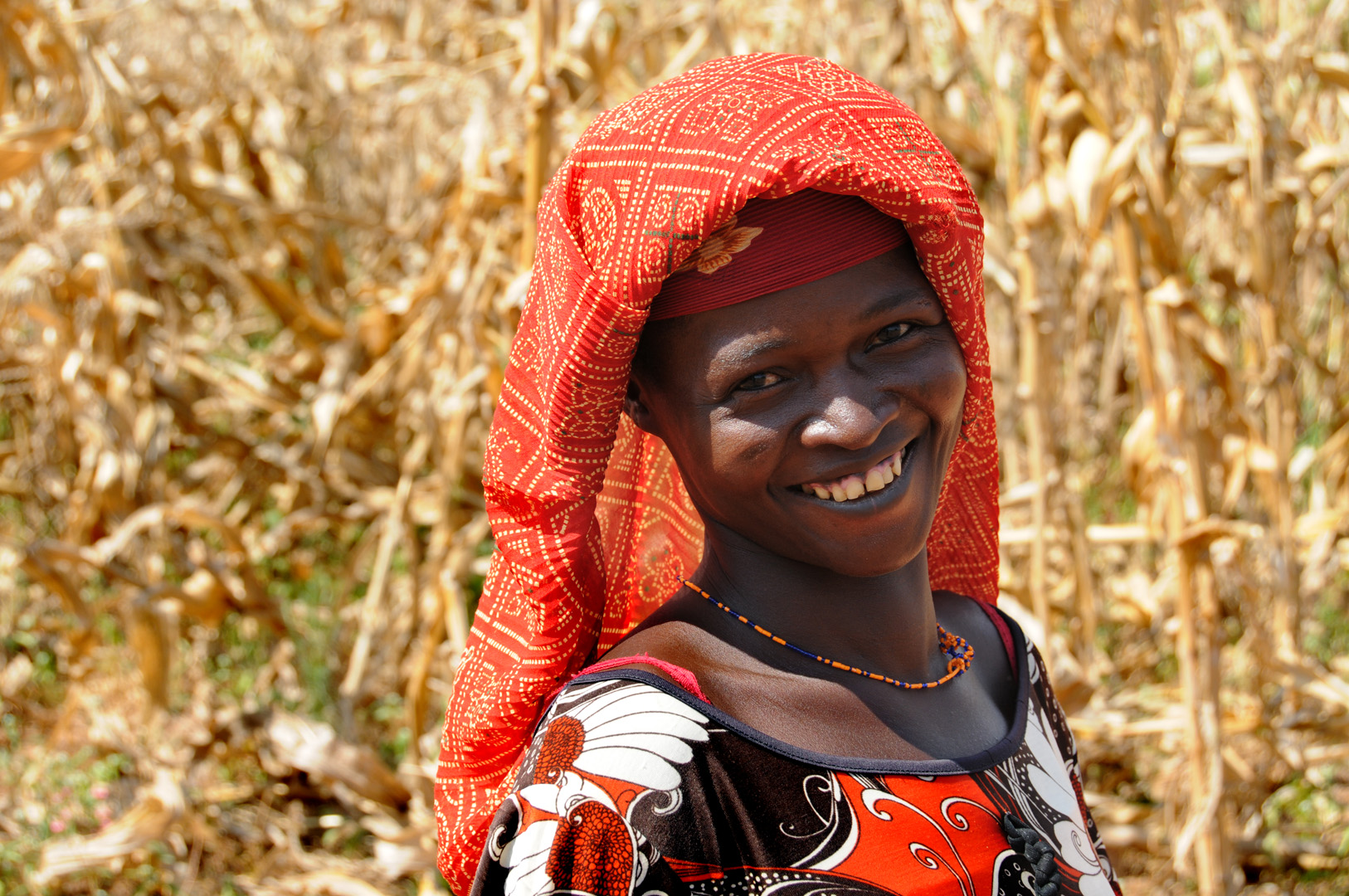
Local woman in Kobli

Most of the population are engaged in agricultural activities followed by trade, transportation and handicrafts. The main crops grown are sorghum, cowpeas, yams and rice.
