= Kouaba =

Coordinates: 10°15′N 1°14′E

- Arrondissement and town
- Interactive map of Kouaba
- Country: Benin
- Department: Atakora Department
- Commune: Natitingou

Population (2002)
  - Total: 6,044
- Time zone: UTC+1 (WAT)

Kouaba is a town and arrondissement in the Atakora Department of northwestern Benin. It is an administrative division under the jurisdiction of the commune of Natitingou. According to the population census conducted by the Institut National de la Statistique Benin on February 15, 2002, the arrondissement had a total population of 6,044.
