= Tanougou Falls =

Waterfall in Benin

Tanougou
- Tanougou Falls (Benin)
- Interactive map of Tanougou
- Coordinates: 10.8053724°N 1.4444946°E
- Total height: 15 m (49 ft)
- Average flow rate: 1.5m^{3}

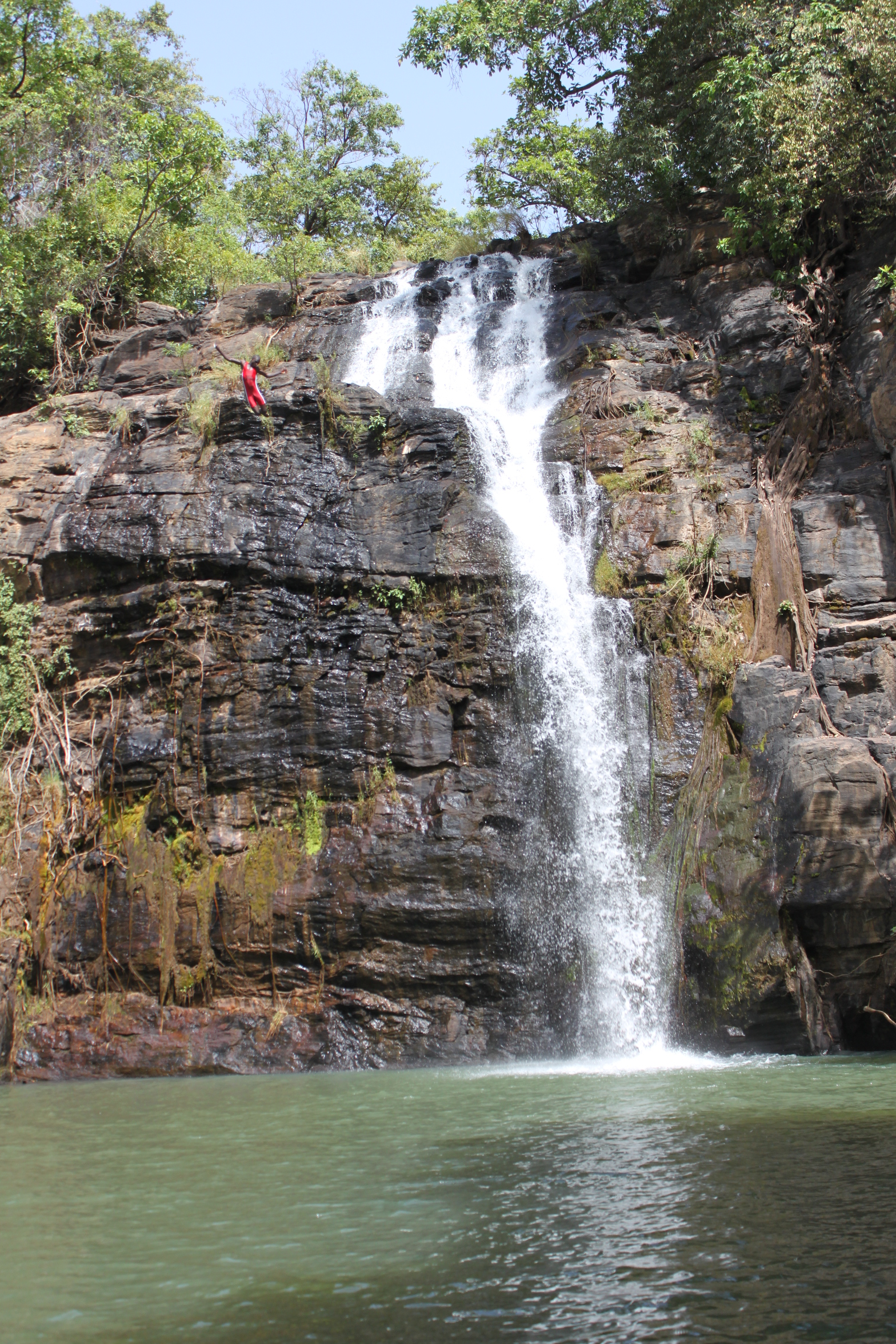
Tanougou Falls

Tanougou Falls is a waterfall in the Atakora mountains on the edge of the Pendjari Game Park in the north of Benin about 20 km northeast of Tanguiéta.

The waterfall is about 15 meters high and has a purported flow rate of 1.5 m^{3} per second, though this is subject to great seasonal fluctuation. The flow is strongest during the rainy season, which lasts from May to September.

The natural pool at the base of the waterfall is popular for swimming.
