= Natitingou I =

Coordinates: 10.3000°N 1.3667°E

- Urban Arrondissement
- Interactive map of Natitingou I
- Country: Benin
- Department: Atakora Department
- Commune: Natitingou

Population (2002)
  - Total: 10,012
- Time zone: UTC+1 (WAT)

Natitingou I is an arrondissement in the Atakora Department of northwestern Benin. It is an administrative division under the jurisdiction of the commune of Natitingou, and makes up part of the urban area. According to the population census conducted by the Institut National de la Statistique Benin on February 15, 2002, the arrondissement had a total population of 10,012.
