= Natitingou =

- Commune and city
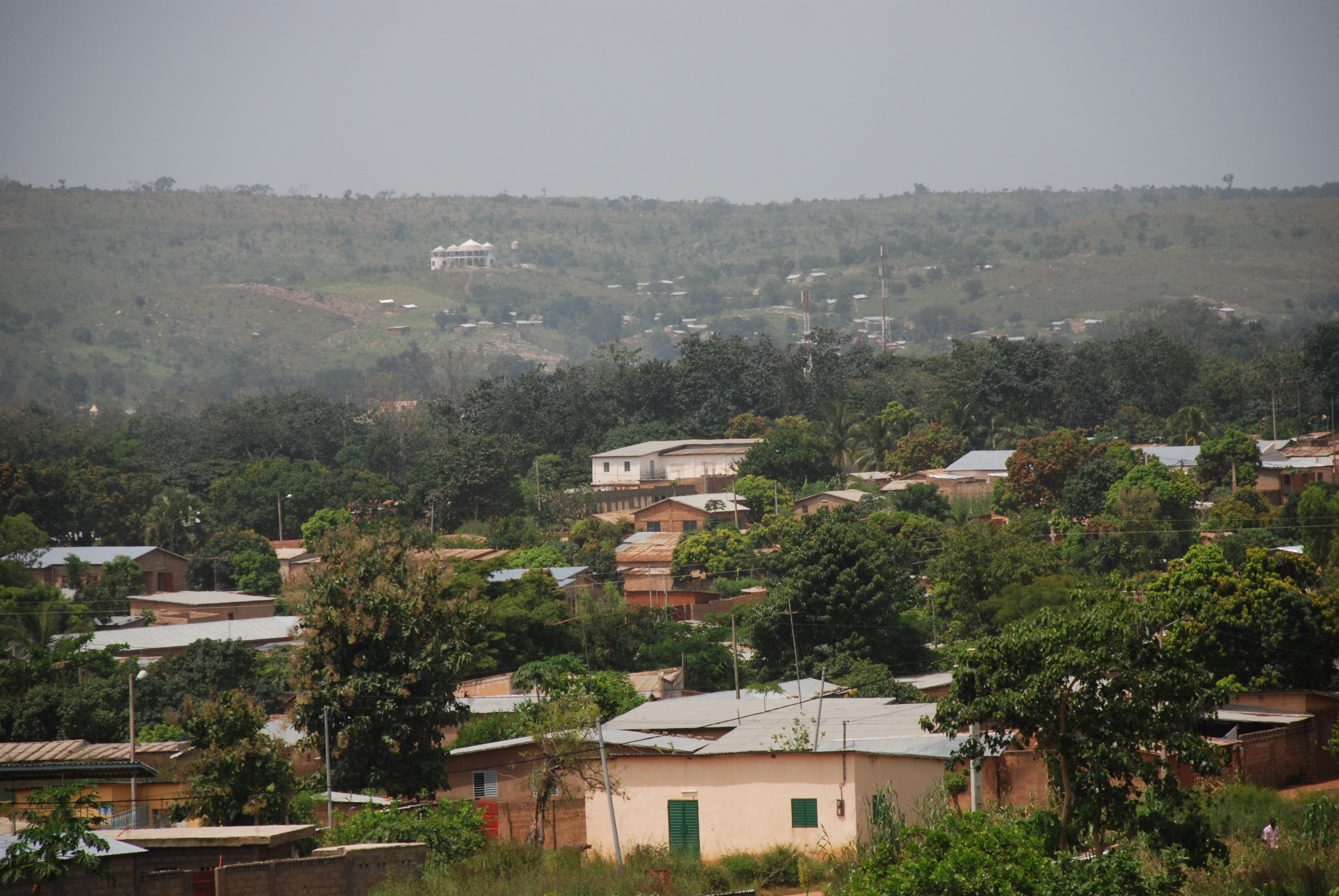
- Natitingou

- Location in Benin
- Coordinates: 10°18′N 1°22′E
- Country: Benin
- Department: Atakora Department

Area
  - Total: 3,045 km^{2} (1,176 sq mi)
- Elevation: 426 m (1,398 ft)

Population (2013 census)
  - Total: 104,010
  - Density: 34.16/km^{2} (88.47/sq mi)
- Time zone: UTC+1 (WAT)

Natitingou [na.ti.tɛ̃ŋ.gu], informally referred to as Nati [na.ti], is a city and commune in north western Benin and the capital of Atakora Department. The commune covers an area of 3045 square kilometres and as of 2013 had a population of 104,010 people.

Natitingou, like many areas of Benin, is home to a constituent monarchy.

== History ==
The town was founded by the Waama ethnic groups but is populated with Ditammari, Dendi, Nateni, Fulani, Fon, and many other ethnic groups. According to popular etymology, the town takes its name from the word Nantibatingou, from the Waama root "Nanto" meaning to crush, as the local people were renowned growers of sorghum which was native to the area and later millet.

Natitingou is evenly divided between Christians and Muslims and, like the rest of Benin, is notable for its ethnic and religious tolerance.

The mountains surrounding the region to the east and west sides are important in local animists, who believe them to be inhabited by spirits. Certain people subscribe to the idea that during the evening these spirits emit sounds similar to those produced by stones which women uses to crush cereal grains. Adherents do not crush cereals in the evening, so as not to confuse the two sounds.

European missionaries visited Natitingou in the 19th century and early 20th century.

== Geography ==
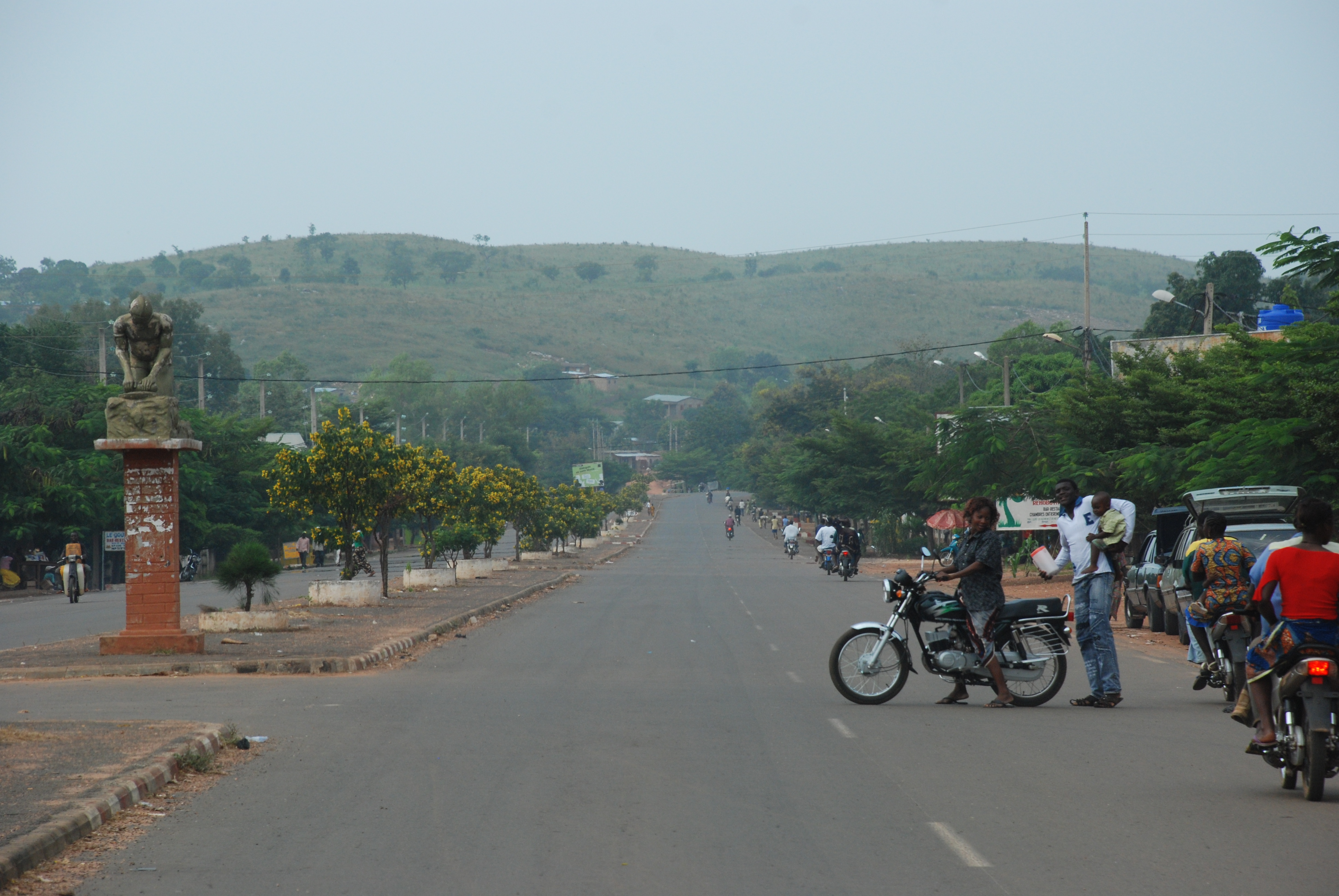
The main road running through Natitingou

The town of Natitingou belongs to the Department of Atakora in northwestern Benin. It lies in a semi-valley, formed by the two mountain ridges that surround it. Natitingou is located 645 km from the economic capital of Cotonou and 100 km from Porga at the entrance of the Pendjari National Park. The commune is bounded on the north by Toucountouna, south and east by Kouandé and to the west by the commune of Boukombé.

The climate in Natitingou is drier than in the south, particularly during the Harmattan season in December/January, when humidity can be as low as 10% and night temperatures can be as low as 17 degrees Celsius.

=== Climate ===
Natitingou has a tropical savanna climate (Aw) according to the Köppen climate classification.

Climate data for Natitingou (1991–2020, extremes 1921–present)
Month	Jan	Feb	Mar	Apr	May	Jun	Jul	Aug	Sep	Oct	Nov	Dec	Year
Record high °C (°F)	40.0 (104.0)	44.2 (111.6)	42.2 (108.0)	41.5 (106.7)	40.7 (105.3)	37.8 (100.0)	39.9 (103.8)	40.7 (105.3)	39.5 (103.1)	37.5 (99.5)	39.4 (102.9)	39.5 (103.1)	44.2 (111.6)
Mean daily maximum °C (°F)	34.9 (94.8)	36.9 (98.4)	38.0 (100.4)	36.4 (97.5)	34.0 (93.2)	31.9 (89.4)	30.0 (86.0)	29.4 (84.9)	30.8 (87.4)	32.9 (91.2)	35.2 (95.4)	35.2 (95.4)	33.8 (92.8)
Daily mean °C (°F)	26.7 (80.1)	28.9 (84.0)	30.8 (87.4)	30.3 (86.5)	28.6 (83.5)	27.0 (80.6)	25.8 (78.4)	25.3 (77.5)	25.9 (78.6)	26.9 (80.4)	27.0 (80.6)	26.5 (79.7)	27.5 (81.5)
Mean daily minimum °C (°F)	18.4 (65.1)	20.8 (69.4)	23.5 (74.3)	24.2 (75.6)	23.2 (73.8)	22.0 (71.6)	21.5 (70.7)	21.3 (70.3)	21.0 (69.8)	20.9 (69.6)	18.7 (65.7)	17.8 (64.0)	21.1 (70.0)
Record low °C (°F)	10.4 (50.7)	13.4 (56.1)	15.3 (59.5)	17.8 (64.0)	17.8 (64.0)	17.8 (64.0)	18.0 (64.4)	18.0 (64.4)	17.7 (63.9)	15.7 (60.3)	11.4 (52.5)	8.8 (47.8)	8.8 (47.8)
Average precipitation mm (inches)	1.8 (0.07)	6.5 (0.26)	15.7 (0.62)	68.6 (2.70)	127.5 (5.02)	159.2 (6.27)	183.2 (7.21)	274.6 (10.81)	241.9 (9.52)	104.6 (4.12)	12.3 (0.48)	0.2 (0.01)	1,196.1 (47.09)
Average precipitation days (≥ 1.0 mm)	0	1	3	8	12	14	17	21	20	13	2	0	111
Average relative humidity (%)	33.1	34.3	46.0	62.7	72.1	77.4	81.5	83.0	81.1	74.9	54.8	39.3	61.7
Mean monthly sunshine hours	272.8	249.2	248.0	240.0	244.9	207.0	164.3	139.5	162.0	226.3	264.0	260.4	2,678.4
Percentage possible sunshine	77	76	67	65	63	55	42	37	45	62	76	74	61
Source 1: NOAA
Source 2: Meteo Climat (extremes)

== Administrative divisions ==
Natitingou is subdivided into nine arrondissements; four of them urban: Natitingou I, Natitingou II, Natitingou III and Natitingou IV (Péporiyakou) and five of them rural:Kotapounga, Kouaba, Koundata, Perma and Tchoumi-Tchoumi. They contain 39 villages and 26 urban districts.

== Demographics ==
The commune has a population of 75,620 inhabitants according to the 2002 census (57,153 in 1992) with 37,388 men and 38,223 women. The density is 56 inhabitants per km^{2}. The population is predominantly young.

A multitude of ethnic groups reside here speaking a variety of languages. The main ethnic groups are the Ditammari, Waama and Dendi. Other than traditional animism, Christianity and Islam are the main religions practised, and there are a number of churches and mosques in the area. However, many local Christians and Muslims often simultaneously believe in animist practices and join in traditional events in Natitingou.

== Economy ==
People in the urban districts of Natitingou are mostly civil servants, craftsmen and merchants. Natitingou has an important administrative function and has some of the most important administrative bodies and services in the Atakora Department.

Agriculture is the backbone to the rural economy, and farmers produce sorghum, maize, yams and, more recently, cotton as a commercial product. The manufacture and marketing of the local drink known as Tchoucoutou is also very important, and is produced by housewives and is their main source of income. The drink is sold to nightclubs where there are many consumers. Tchoucoutou is made from the grain sorghum and is a form of malt beer.

== Tourism ==
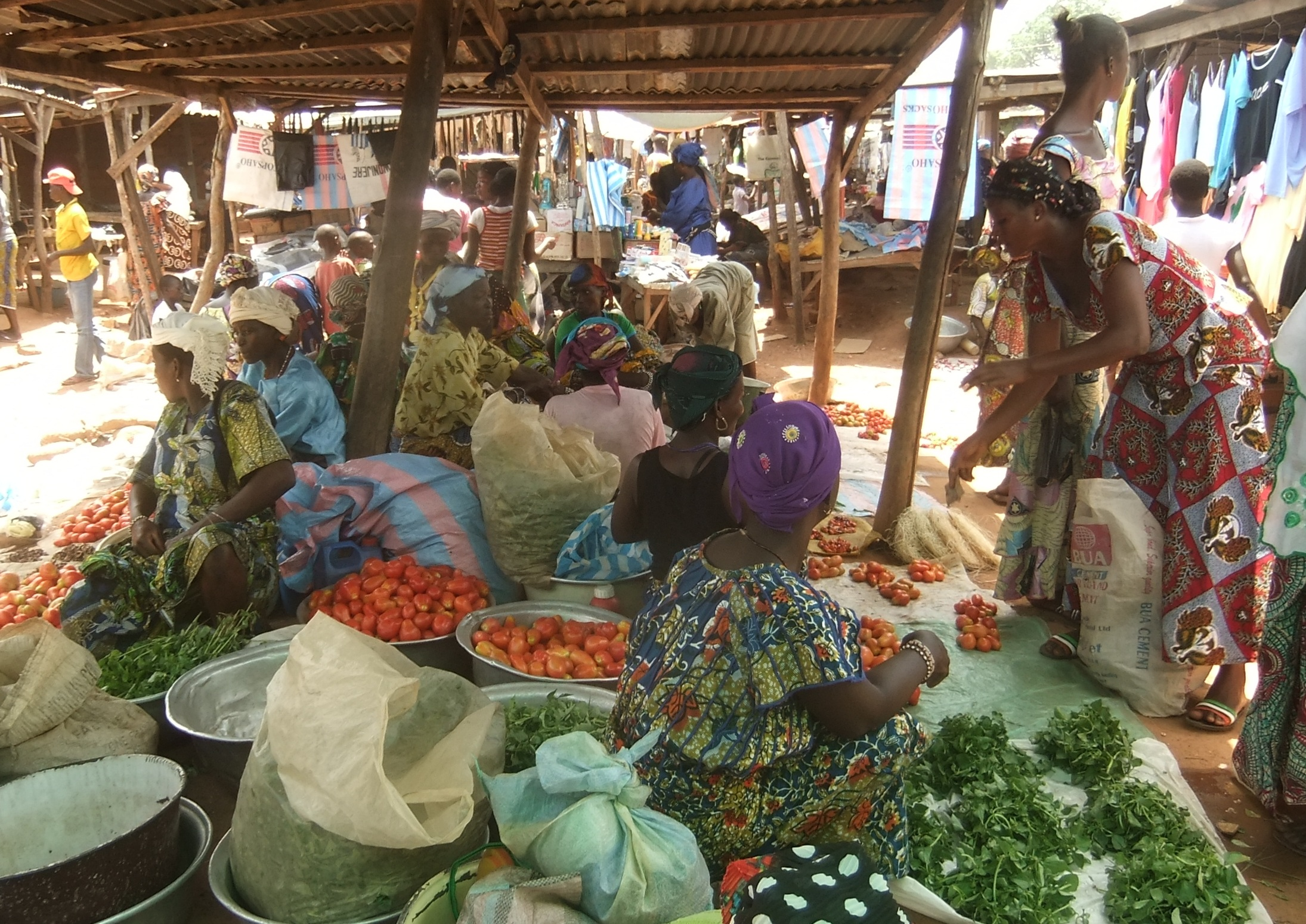
A marketplace in Natitingou

Natitingou is about 50 km from Benin's Pendjari National Park, where tourists can see West African wildlife during the months of December through June. The Kota and Tanougou waterfalls, the great mud castles of the Betammaribe known as the Tata Somba are also within an hour or two of the town by car. Within the town itself can be found the Regional Museum of Natitingou, as well as two marketplaces.

== Notable people ==
Villanova University Men's Basketball player Mouphtaou Yarou is a native of Natitingou. He was ranked #9 in 2009 among high school basketball prospects in America.

Charles Thiebaut, a promoter of African music and culture in France, is a native of Natitingou. He grew up in an orphanage and was adopted by the Thiebaut family from France, when he was 4 years old.
