= Toucountouna =

- Commune, arrondissement and town
- Location in Benin
- Coordinates: 10°29′55″N 1°22′32″E
- Country: Benin
- Department: Atakora Department

Area
  - Total: 620 sq mi (1,600 km^{2})

Population (2013)
  - Total: 39,779
- Time zone: UTC+1 (WAT)

Toucountouna [tu.kun.tu.na] is a town, arrondissement and commune in the Atakora Department of north-western Benin. The commune covers an area of 1600 square kilometres and as of 2013 had a population of 39,779 people.

== See also ==
- Manafaga
