= Tammari people =

Ethnic group of Benin and Togo

Tammari
- Person: Otammari
- People: Betammaribe
- Language: Ditammari

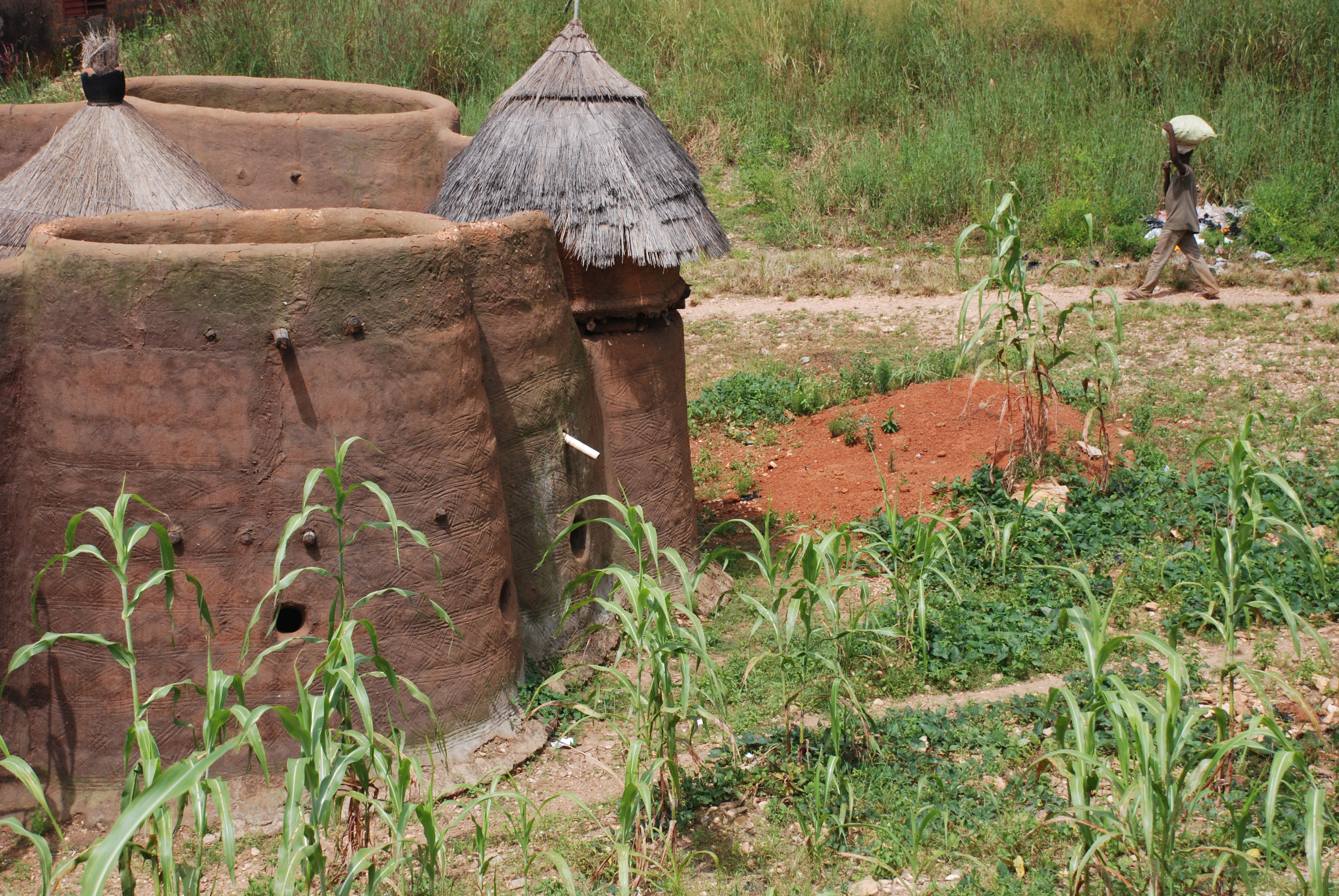
A Tammari house. The thatched structure in the middle of the roof (left) covers sleeping quarters, whereas the one on the right is a granary. The cylindrical structures in the walls are used for storage or for keeping small livestock.

The Tammari people, also known as Batammariba, Tamberma, Somba, Otamari or Ottamari, are an Oti–Volta-speaking people of the Atakora Department of Benin and neighboring areas of Togo, where they are officially known as Ta(m)berma. They are famous for their two-story fortified houses, known as Tata Somba ("Somba house"), in which the ground floor houses livestock at night, internal alcoves are used for cooking, and the upper floor contains a rooftop courtyard that is used for drying grain, as well as containing sleeping quarters and granaries. These evolved by adding an enclosing roof to the clusters of huts, joined by a connecting wall that is typical of Gur-speaking areas of West Africa.

The Tammari are mostly animists. The Tammari language is in the Gur family.

The Batammariba are agronomic herdsmen who inhabit the hills and valleys. Being clannish by nature, they oppose any form of domination and servitude.

Historical research has traced their migration from diverse regions, settling in small groups, while preserving their societal practices of origin. The Batammariba tribe doesn't form a homogeneous society, but Batammariba language is a strong common link and despite disparities in ceremonial practices, all Tammari affirm allegiance as "Serpent Children". They believe they are the offspring of a grand, invisible, underground "Serpent Mother" who bore the first eggs of their ancestors.

Today, Tammari are especially found in towns such as Nikki and Kandi that were once Bariba kingdoms and in Parakou in mid-eastern Benin. However, there is also a significant population of them in northwest Benin in the Atacora region in cities such as Natitingou and a number of villages. Many in the northwest have migrated to the east.

== Ethnonym ==
The name Batammariba (or Batammaliba) means "those who are the real architects of the earth".

== Link to the land ==
After years (or maybe centuries) of wandering, the Batammariba settled in the valleys, a way of existence they preferred to their former history of conflict with law-imposing warlords and chieftains. Their name implies a close connection to the land where rituals are practised.

The underground region is the domain of dead spirits to whom the Batammariba owe their very existence with nature and the ability to generate.

The Batammariba do not consider themselves landowners, but caretakers. Their settlement could not have happened without the intercession of the Babietiba, (first settlers), who belonged to a highly culturally evolved group of foragers, then introduced them to the “true owners of the region”: underground forces incarnated into a source such as a rock or a tree. These ancestors of the Batammaribas concluded an alliance with the forces, swearing to respect some agricultural rules and the pieces of land that belonged to the forces. In exchange, the forces allowed the ancestors to build houses and to harvest the soil. Initiations or rituals are meetings with underground forces. This link to the underground forces demanded bravery, self-mastery, and discretion, essential qualities by which the Batammaribas are formed from a young age.

== The Takyenta ==
The Takyenta (also spelled Takienta) traditional dwelling, including the famous Tata Somba, is typically built of mud and surrounded by towers that support garrets, evoking medieval citadels. The dwellings each have a masculine (south) orientation and a feminine (north) orientation. Models of takyentas differ from village to village. The storied construction with its solid walls acts as a protective fortress to keep out invaders and repel fatal spear attacks on its inhabitants. It also serves as protection against leopards who, according to the village elders, roam freely in the overgrown bush. Building the fortress takes several months and requires much skilled labor. The upper floor is a living space and a safe haven.

Up until 2000, parents and their children slept in elevated box structures placed on the sides and center areas of the terrasse. These boxes were also designed to protect the inhabitants and their guests from the midday heat. Nowadays the fortresses are reserved for ancestral devotional ceremonies. The souls of the ancestors reside in the earthen cone-shaped altars. Strangers cannot enter the temple area without permission from the head of the home.

On the exterior south side of the fortress are the altars containing spirits of animals that were formerly hunted and killed. The altar can also contain underground spirits with whom those ancestors who possessed the gift of "sight" had made a pact. Therefore, the connection between the dwellings and the sacred altars of the village is extremely strong.

The uniqueness and sophistication of this architecture has been recognized since 2004 by UNESCO as a world heritage site, with the statement, "Koutammakou is an outstanding example of territorial occupation by a people in constant search of harmony between man and the surrounding nature". The residences of the Somba people have become an attraction in the fledgling tourist industry of Benin and Togo.

== Traditional religion ==
The traditional religion of the Batammariba centers around one Supreme Deity, Kuiye, the sun god and creator of both gods and humans. Kuiye is believed to resemble a human in appearance, but is also considered both male and female, so that the deity is often referred to as "The Sun, Our Father and Our Mother". Like all living beings, according to Batammariba thought, Kuiye possesses a corporeal form known as Kuiye, and a soul, known as Liye. Kuiye, the corporeal form of the deity, is thought to live in the "sun village" in the west, above the sky, while Liye travels the sky each day in the form of a disc of light.

Butan, the goddess of the Earth and the Underworld, is Kuiye's complement as either Kuiye's wife or twin. Butan is the ruler of everything within the Earth or on its surface, including vegetal growth and agriculture, game proliferation, cemeteries, etc. Her corporeal form, invisible to humans, is said to resemble a mudfish, an animal that is thought to vomit up an infinite amount of water. Because of this, her main shrine is a village spring. Her complementary soul is called Bupe, and is visible as the surface of the Earth.

The third major Batammariba deity is Oyinkakwata, "the Rich Man Above", who is the god of the sky, of thunder, lightning and storms. His soul is visible to humans in the form of lightning, but his invisible body is said to be filled with air.

But the Batammariba world is filled with many more deities who are quite different than the three cosmological gods described above: initiation deities who select their worshippers according to various factors such as gender, martial prowess, ability for clairvoyance, etc. They include the Fawafa, the python deity of men's initiations, Fakuntifa, the lizard deity of women's initiations, Fayenfe, the god of war and death, Litakon, the god of twins and fertility, and Kupon, the deity of divination, etc.

These deities are better considered families of deities, or deity types, rather than unique deities: male and female Fawafa deities, for example, are believed to produce offspring of their deity type. The Batammariba may acquire these deities by inheriting them, hunting and capturing them in the wild, or by buying and selling them to and from their neighbors. The matriarch, and presumably most powerful, of each deity type is believed to reside in Linaba, the mythological first village where Kuiye first created humans and deities.

== Founding of Batammaribas ==
This connection is a cosmic expression of Batammariba spirituality and they have shown themselves to be intractable concerning their foundation. They maintain a strictly age-based hierarchy between elders and younger residents, like all African societies, but oppose any form of centralized power, and reject hereditary chieftains. Two, four or six clans can form a "village" or, to be more precise, a "territorial groupement" centered around the rituals upheld by each clan. A ritual center is the foundation of the village and is organized around a cemetery, a large initiation house for the youth, and the head serpent sanctuary. The clans share and recognize certain family bonds as they all descend from the same founding fathers. Another important pillar of the Batammariba is an exceptionally well-preserved system of funeral rites and initiation ceremonies. Those responsible for the rituals are imbued with authority and are chosen following rigorous ethics, notably discretion and self-mastery as, for example, if one is threatened with a knife, prefers to be killed than to kill. Nowadays the Batammariba accord the same importance to their rituals.

The youngest amongst them, whether schooled or not, whether they leave or stay in the village, will only very rarely not keep the cycle of initiation tradition.

Traditions are preserved in the present day, including caring for and respecting their land, keeping their sense of pride, upholding warrior traditions, and using hunting skills. Traditional ceremonies help to uphold these aspects of their culture. Alongside this, the Batammariba keep a distance from outside influences. This has also helped them to preserve their millenary heritage, an identifiable cultural feature of their people.

From 19 to 24 October 2018, UNESCO organized an emergency mission to assess the damage allegedly caused by the August 2018 rains in Koutammakou on habitat and on the intangible heritage. The report was prepared by three international experts: Ishanlosen Odiaua, Dominique Sewane and Franck Ogou.

== Traditional scarification ==
The Tammari people are known for their traditional body scarring rituals, starting between the age of two and three. These special marks are a form of lifelong identification marks (tattoo ID), which identify a person as belonging to one's tribe as well as more coded personal information. Additional marks are added at puberty, readiness for marriage, post-child birth as a form of visible communication. These scars range from some on the face, to belly and back.

== Researchers ==
- Suzanne Preston Blier: American art and architectural historian. Her doctoral research in the town of Koufitoukou in Togo the 1970s led to various books and articles on related architecture, religion, cosmology, initiation, and funerals.
- Leo Frobenius: German anthropologist and archaeologist (1873–1938) whose work is in the archives of the Institute Frobenius associated with the Johann Wolfgang Goethe University of Frankfurt am Main, including four scientific collections and a large image collection.
- Paul Mercier: He carried out solo research for a short period in 1950 in Natitingou concern the movements of the different tammariba subgroups and their neighbors and wrote numerous articles describe their social organization and land tenure.
- Albert Marie Maurice: Military Natitingou in 1950, Albert Marie Maurice (1913–200211) has conducted extensive research on this company. His photographic archives are in the Academy of Sciences of overseas.
- Rigobert Kouagou: Originally from Natitingou in Benin, Rigobert Kouagou is a specialist in the Tammari language. He is the author of poems and stories translated into French.
- Dominique Sewane: French ethnologist Dominique Sewane: since the 1980s, her research, publications, and reference works have focused mainly on the funeral and initiation rites of Batammaribas of Togo.

== Bibliography ==
- Céline Al Zoubi, L’Agriculture tammari dans l’Atakora. Anthropo histoire des techniques agricoles des Batammariba de l’Atakora pré-colonial (Togo, Bénin). Pistes de recherche (Tammari Agriculture in the Atakora. Anthropological History of the Agricultural Techniques of the Batammariba of Pre-Colonial Atakira (Togo, Bénin). Research Pathways), master I and II thesis in History of Techniques, Université de Paris-I, 2008.
- Suzanne Preston Blier, The Anatomy of Architecture: Ontology and Metaphor in Batammaliba Architectural Expression, Cambridge University Press, 1987.
- Charles Bonnet, Des pharaons venus d’Afrique, la cachette de Kerma (in collaboration with D. Valbelle), Paris, Citadelles & Mazenod, 2005.
- Gaël Kpotogbé Amoussou, L’Imaginaire des Batammariba du Togo à travers leur habitat, Le Nègre Éditeur, 2011.
- Gaël Kpotogbé Amoussou, Transmission du savoir-faire (Transmission of Know-how), PAF, 2014.
- Philippe Charlier, Zombis, enquête anthropologique sur les morts vivants (Zombies, an Anthropological Inquiry into the Living Dead), Éditions Tallandier, 2015.
- Robert Cornevin, Histoire du Togo (History of Togo), Paris, Berger-Levrault, 1959, 427 p.
- Robert Cornevin, Histoire des peuples d’Afrique Noire (History of the Peoples of Black Africa), Paris, Berger Levrault, 1962, 716 p.
- Lazare Eloundou, with Odiaua Ishanlosen, Patrimoine Mondial africain: Une diversité remarquable (African World Heritage: A Remarkable Diversity), (preface by Irina Bokova), éditions 696. UNESCO, 2013
- Leo Frobenius, 1912-1913, Und Africa sprach. Bericht über den Verlauf der 3. Reiseperiode des DIAFE in den Jahren 1910-1912, Vita, Berlin-Charlotenburg, v. III, Unter den unsträfftlichen Aethiopen, 1913, 669 p.
- Nicoué-Lodjou Gayibor, Histoire des Togolais des origines aux années 1960 (History of the Togolese People from their Origins to the 1960s), Karthala, 2011
- Alain Godonou, École du patrimoine africain (School of African Heritage), Africultures, 2007/1 (n° 70)
- Tilo Grätz, La rébellion de Kaba (1916-1917) dans l’imaginaire politique au Bénin, (The Kaba Rebellion (1916-1917) in Beninese Political Imagery). Paris. Cahiers d'Études Africaines 160, 2000
- Marie and Philippe Huet, Koutammarikou - Somba Portraits - Nord Bénin, éditions Hesse, 2012, 155 p. (ISBN 978-2357060210)
- Joseph Ki-Zerbo, Histoire de l’Afrique noire d’hier à demain (History of Black Africa from Yesterday to Tomorrow), Hatier, 1972, 682 p.
- Rigobert Kpanipa Kouagou, L'identité Tammari (Tammari Identity), Université nationale du Bénin, Cotonou, 1984 (master's thesis)
- Rigobert Kpanipa Kouagou, Le défi identitaire du peuple Tammari (The Identity Challenge of the Tammari People), FACTAM, Bénin, 2002.
- Koumba N. Koussey, Le peuple otammari, Essai de synthèse historique, Université nationale du Bénin, Cotonou, 1977 (master's thesis)
- Bakoukalébé Kpakou, Histoire du peuple tammari de Koutougou du xviiie siècle à l’époque coloniale (History of the Tammari People from the 18th Century to the Colonial Era), master's thesis, University of Kara, Togo, 2014.
- N’Tcha Layota, Analyse parémiologique ditamari. Structure syntaxique et ethno-sémantique de la parémie, doctoral thesis, Université d’Abomey-Calavi, Cotonou, Bénin, 2019
- Albert-Marie Maurice, Atakora, Otiau, Otammari, Osari, Peuples du Nord-Bénin (1950), Académie des sciences d'outre-mer, Paris, 1986, 481 p.
- Achille Mbembe, Afriques indociles (Undocile Africas), Karthala, 1988.
- Elikia M'Bokolo, L’Afrique au xxe siècle. Le continent convoité, Seuil, 1985.
- Paul Mercier, Tradition, changement, histoire. Les « Somba » du Dahomey septentrional, ed. Anthropos, Paris, 1968, 538 p. (conclusion by Jean-Pierre Chrétien, "Annales. Économies, Sociétés, Civilisations", 1969, vol. 24, no 3, p. 640-648, on line Persée [11])
- Paul Mercier, Marques du statut individuel chez les Somba (Status symbols among the Somba), "Conferencia international des africanistas ocidentais". 2nd conference (Bissau 1947), Lisbon, v. V, 1952, pp. 219‑240.
- Paul Mercier, L’habitat et l’occupation de la terre chez les “Somba”, "Bulletin de l’IFAN", v. XV, no 2, 1953, pp. 798‑817.
- Paul Mercier, L’habitation à étage dans l’Atakora, Études dahoméennes, v. XI, 1954, pp. 29–79.
- Paul Mercier, Civilisation du Bénin (Civilization of Benin), Paris, "Société continentale d’éditions modernes illustrées", 1962, 365 p
- Paul Mercier, Histoire de l’Anthropologie (History of Anthropology), Paris, PUF, 1966.
- Paul Mercier, Tradition, changement, histoire. Les « Somba » du Dahomey septentrional, Paris, "Anthropos", 1968, 538 p.
- Bantchin Napakou, L’Universalité des droits de l’homme dans la modernité politique. De l’éthique de la diversité à la trans‑culturalité en Afrique, éditions universitaires européennes, 2016.
- Théophile Nata, Étude descriptive du ditãmmari, Rapport de fin de 1re année de doctorat de 3e cycle de linguistique, 1974.
- Didier N’Dah, Sites archéologiques et peuplement de la région de l’Atakora (nord-ouest du Bénin), doctoral thesis in African Archeology, vol. 1 and 2, Université de Ouagadougou, 2008‑2009.
- N'Dah N’Dati, Le Kutammaaku (Togo-Bénin) du xviie siècle à la conquête coloniale, doctoral thesis, Université de Lomé, 2017
- Komi N’Kéré, Cartes du Koutammakou. Aires sacrées. Limites, itinéraires, intr. D. Sewane, Patrimoine culturel immatériel de l’Unesco, Japan Fund, 2009.
- K.J. N’Tcha, L’anthropologie économique des Betammaribe dans l’Atakora (Economic Anthropology of the Betammaribe in Atakora), master's thesis, Université du Bénin, 1983.
- Sylvain Prudhomme, dir., Contes du pays tammari (Bénin), 2003, Paris, Karthala, 196 p.
- Dominique Sewane (as Myriam Smadja) La maison qui s'enfonce sous la terre (Tamberma du Togo), in "Pour Jean Malaurie : 102 témoignages en hommage à quarante ans d’études arctiques" (ed. Sylvie Devers), éditions Plon, Paris, 1990, p. 79-89 (ISBN 9782259019132)
- Dominique Sewane (as Myriam Smadja) Les affaires du mort (Tamberma du Nord-Togo) [archive], in "Systèmes de pensée en Afrique noire", no 11, 1991, p. 57-90.
- Dominique Sewane, La Lance et le Serpent. Rituels du dikuntri et du difwani des Tammariba du Togo, École pratique des hautes études, Paris, 1999, 2 vol., 446 p. (Ethnology thesis)
- Dominique Sewane, Celles qui tombent chez les Tammariba du Togo, in "Familiarité avec les dieux. Transe et possession (Afrique noire, Madagascar, la Réunion)" (ed. Marie-Claude Dupré), Presses Universitaires Blaise-Pascal, Clermont-Ferrand, 2001, p. 185-221 (ISBN 978-2-84516-147-4)
- Dominique Sewane, Le premier sorgho et la confrérie des Vrais Hommes chez les Tamberma du Togo, in "Cuisine et société en Afrique – Histoire, saveurs, savoir-faire" (ed. Monique Chastenet, François-Xavier Fauvelle-Aymar and Dominique Juhe-Beaulaton), Karthala, Paris, 2002, p. 85-102 (ISBN 9782845862784)
- Dominique Sewane, La Nuit des Grands Morts. L’initiée et l’épouse chez les Tamberma du Togo (preface by Jean Malaurie), Economica, Paris, 2002, "coll. Afrique Cultures", 272 p. (ISBN 9782717844849) (note by Suzanne Lallemand in the "Journal des africanistes", 74-1/2, 2004, p. 527-529 [12] [archive])
- Dominique Sewane, Rapport final en vue de l’inscription du Koutammakou, pays des Batammariba au Togo, on the list of World Heritage sites, Unesco, December 2002, 102 p.
- Dominique Sewane, Les Batãmmariba, le peuple voyant : carnets d'une ethnologue, Éd. de La Martinière, Paris, 2004, 189 p. (ISBN 2-7324-3209-1)
- Dominique Sewane, Puissance du nom. Les noms secrets des Batãmmariba du Togo, Bénin, in "La mort et l’immortalité : encyclopédie des savoirs et des croyances" (ed. Jean-Philippe de Tonnac and Frédéric Lenoir), Bayard, Paris, 2004, p. 855-866 (ISBN 9782227471344)
- Dominique Sewane, La tombe et ses orientations, in "Antigone et le devoir de sépulture : actes du colloque international de l'Université de Lausanne" (May 2005) (ed. Muriel Gilbert), Labor Fides, Lausanne, November 2005, p. 161-176 (ISBN 2-8309-1173-3)
- Dominique Sewane, Le souffle du mort : la tragédie de la mort chez les Batãmmariba du Togo, Bénin, Plon, Paris, 2003, "collection Terre Humaine", Plon, 2007, 849 p., 2020, collection Terre Humaine, Plon (ISBN 978-2-266-17579-1) (cf notes de lecture [13] [archive] et [14] [archive])
- Dominique Sewane, Rapport de coordination du Programme de sauvegarde du Patrimoine culturel immatériel des Batammariba du Koutammakou – Première Phase (novembre 2008-novembre 2009)
- Dominique Sewane, Le Koutammarkou, haut lieu de l’humanité, in "Dieux, rois et peuples du Bénin : arts anciens du littoral aux savanes" (ed. Hélène Joubert and Christophe Vital), Musée Branly, Somogy, 2008, p. 106-111 (ISBN 978-2757201855)
- Dominique Sewane, Rites et pensée des Batammariba pour les écoles primaires du Togo - Ministère des enseignements primaire secondaire et de l’alphabétisation du Togo, Patrimoine Culturel Immatériel de l’UNESCO, éditions Haho, Lomé (Togo), 2009 (in "Programme de sauvegarde du Patrimoine immatériel des Batammariba" – Unesco-Japan)
- Dominique Sewane, Le voyant, le devin et le maître du savoir chez les Batammariba (Togo, Bénin), in Soazick Kerneis and Raymond Verdier, "Les Justices de l'invisible", L'Harmattan, Paris, 2013, p. 145-180 (ISBN 9782336328041) (actes du colloque de Paris)
- Dominique Sewane, Carnets de terrain au Koutammakou (Togo), in "Revue de la BNF", 2013/3, no 45, p. 40-48
- Dominique Sewane, Transmission des savoirs au Koutammakou, in "Regards scientifiques sur l'Afrique depuis les indépendances" (ed. M. Lafay, F. Le Guennec-Coppens, E. Coulibaly), Karthala, Paris, 2016, 486 p., pp. 179–209
- Dominique Sewane with Bantéé N’Koué and Bakoukalébé Kpakou Koutammakou - Lieux sacrés, Preface by Jean Malaurie, Postface by Marcus Boni Teiga, éditions Hesse, 2018, ISBN 978-2-35706-041-8
- Marcus Boni Teiga, Patrimoine. Le legs de l’Afrique noire à la Grèce et la Rome antique, Complicités, 2019.
- Ibrahima Thioub,(éd). Patrimoines et sources historiques en Afrique, Dakar, Union académique internationale, UCAD, 2007, 179 p.
- Jean-Pierre Vallat (ed.), Le Togo. Lieux de mémoire et sites de conscience, L’Harmattan, 2013.

== Gallery ==
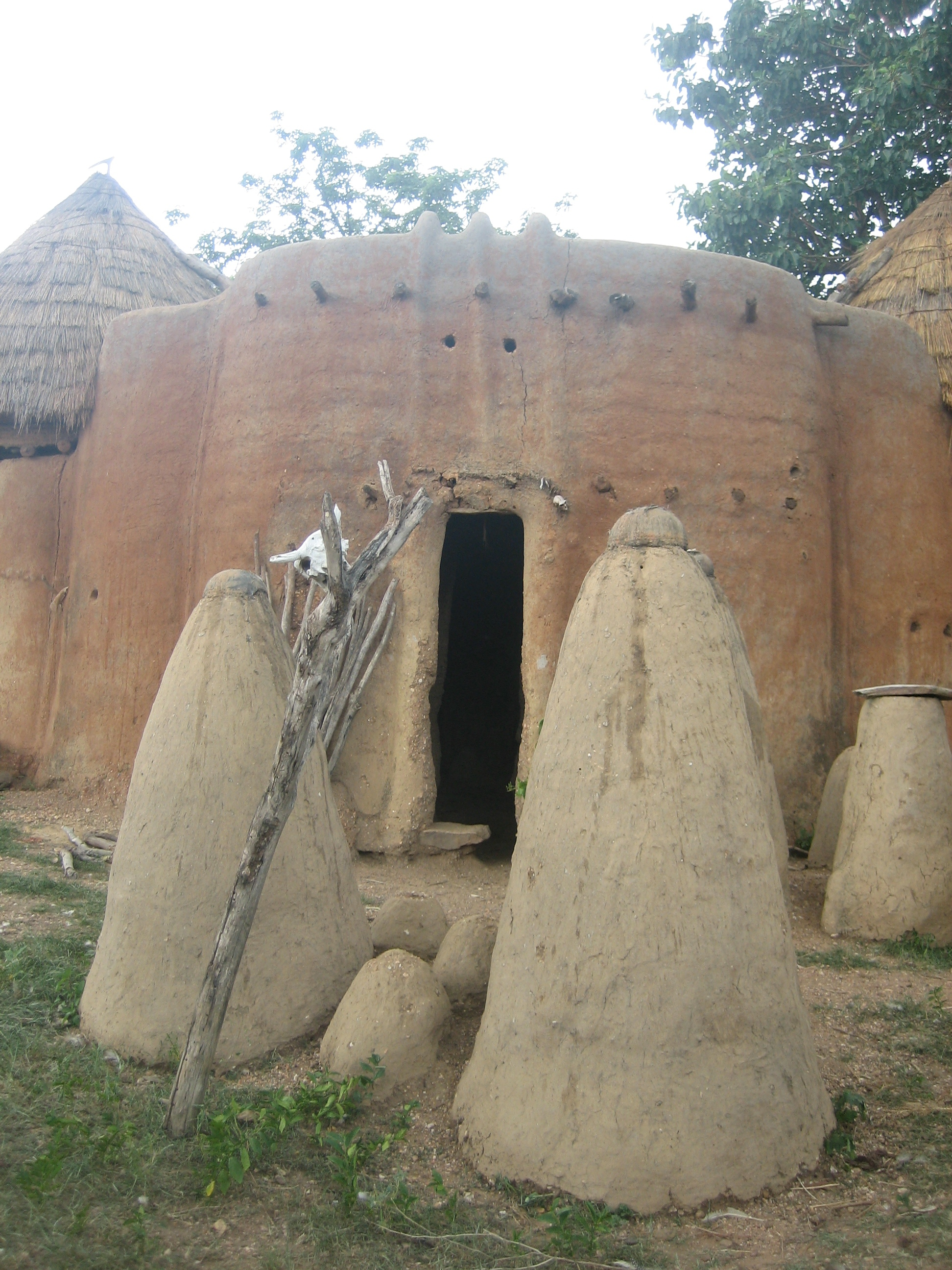
The entrance of a Tammari house, with twin altars

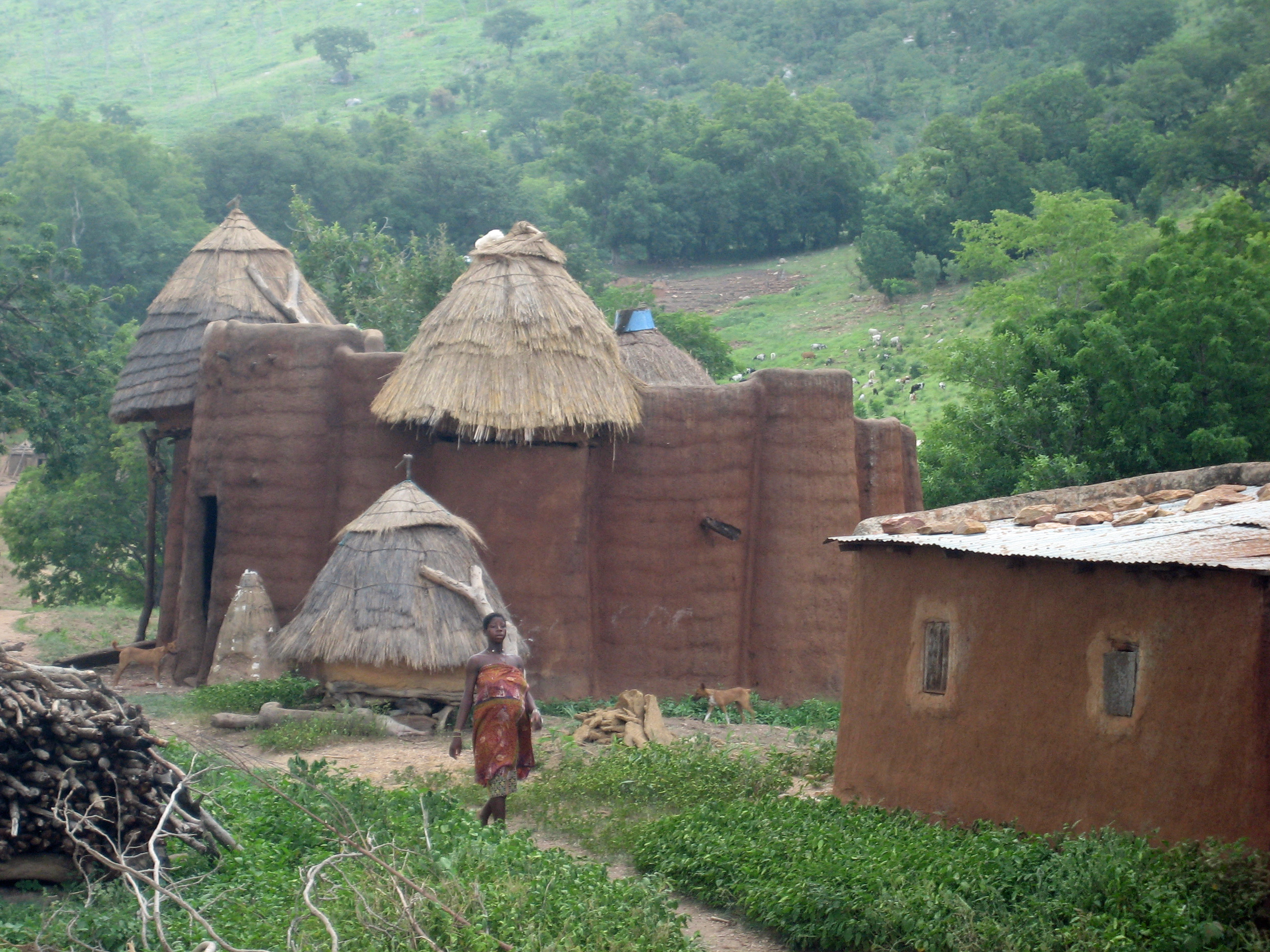
A Tammari house with granaries. The forked poles at the left granary are ladders, with steps cut along their lengths

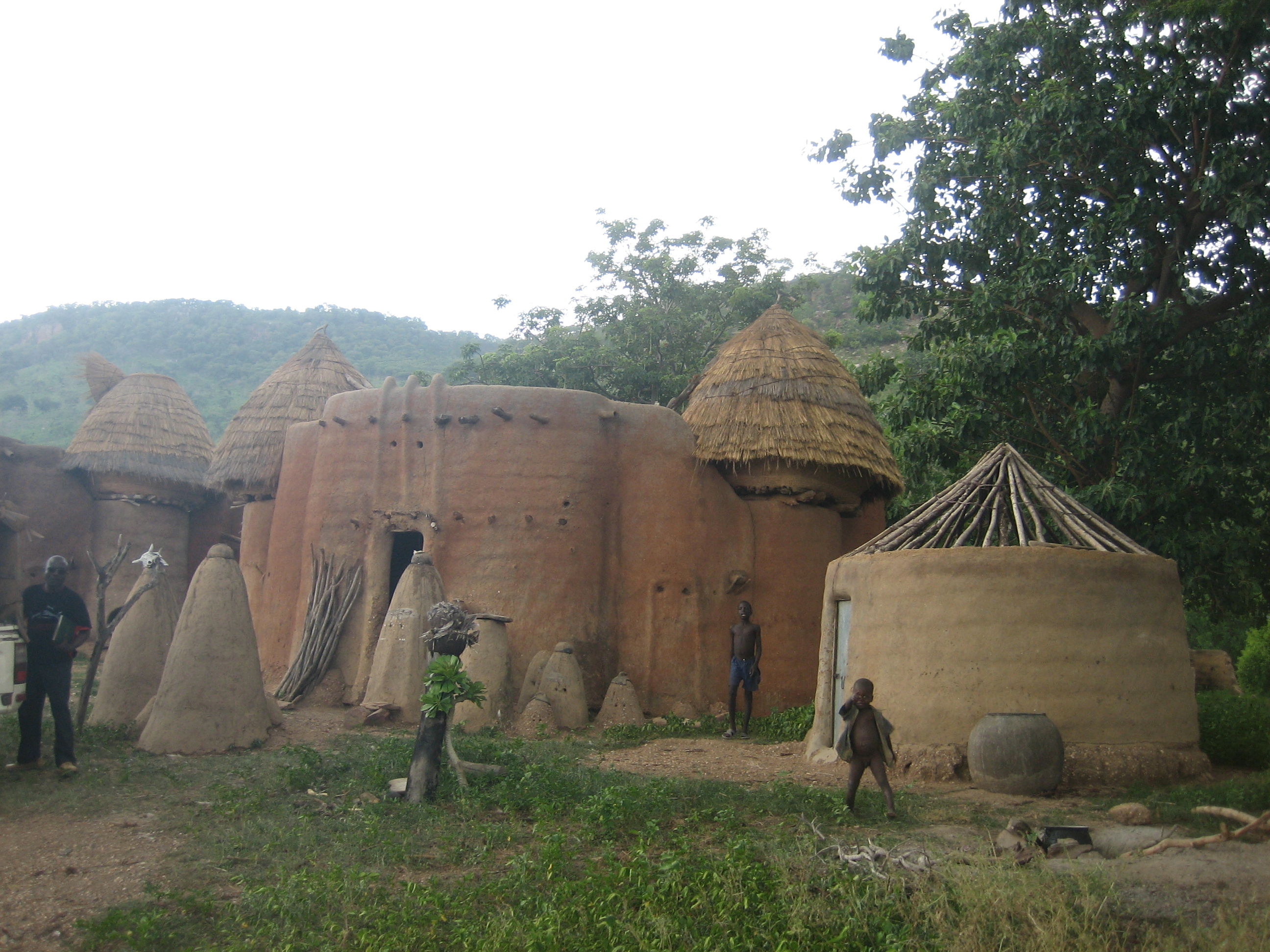
Neighboring Tammari houses, with multiple altars
