= Manafaga =

- Commune and city
- Location in Benin
- Coordinates: 10°22′0″N 1°31′0″E
- Country: Benin
- Time zone: UTC+1 (WAT)

Manafaga is a village of western Benin, a country in Western Africa, formerly known as Dahomey (until 1975). It is located at 10°22'0N 1°31'0E with an altitude of 608 meters (1998 feet). It is roughly 447 kilometers north of Benin's capital Porto-Novo, and is the same time zone 'Africa/Porto-Novo'. The approximate population within a 7 kilometer radius of this area is 4588.
