= Tanguiéta =

- Commune, arrondissement and town
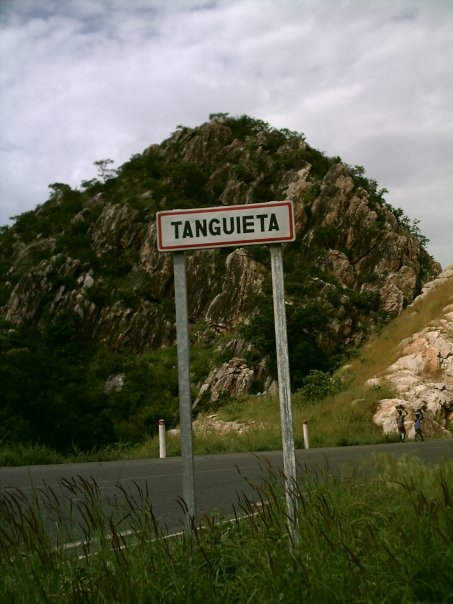
- Entry sign for Tanguieta, Benin (coming from Natitingou), 2007

- Location in Benin
- Coordinates: 10°37′N 1°16′E
- Country: Benin
- Department: Atakora Department

Area
  - Commune, arrondissement and town: 2,110 sq mi (5,465 km^{2})

Population (2013)
  - Commune, arrondissement and town: 74,675
  - Metro: 27,094
- Time zone: UTC+1 (WAT)

Tanguiéta [tɑ̃ŋ.gje.ta] is a town, arrondissement and commune located in the Atakora Department of Benin.The commune covers an area of 5465 square kilometres and as of 2013 had a population of 74,675 people. As of 2007 the town had an estimated population of 21,290. It lies on the RNIE 3 highway which connects it to Natitingou.

Tanguiéta was the departmental seat of government during French colonial rule. The headquarters of the Pendjari National Park are based in the town, and the Hôpital Saint Jean de Dieu de Tanguiéta is a regionally recognized hospital. The town has internet access available.

The main languages spoken in the town include French, Dendi, Waama, Nateni, and Biali.

== See also ==
- Communes of Benin
