= Pendjari National Park =

UNESCO World Heritage Site in Benin

- IUCN category II (national park)
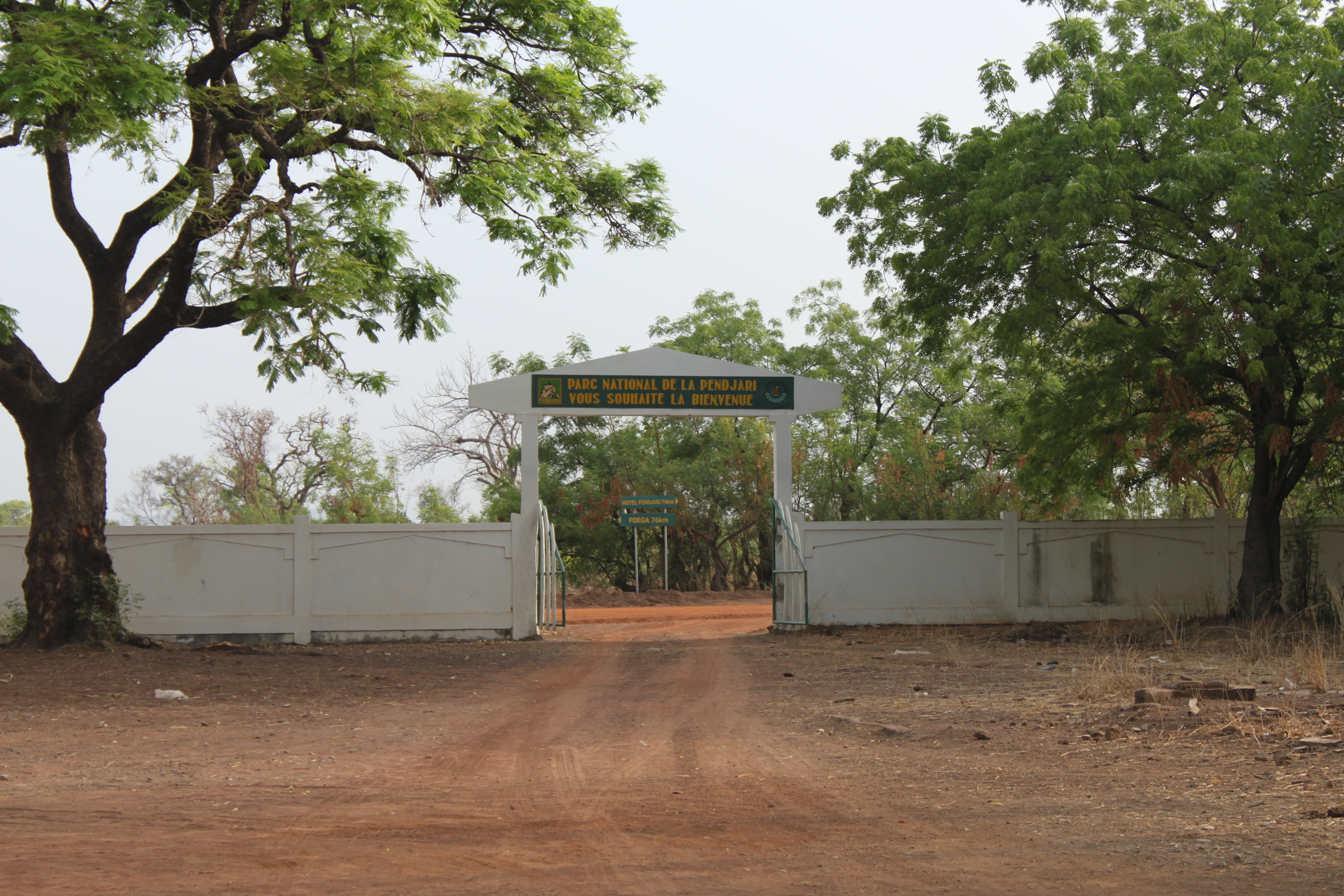

- IUCN Protected Areas of the WAP complex
- Location: Benin, West Africa
- Nearest city: Tanguieta
- Coordinates: 11°3′N 1°31′E
- Area: 2,755 km^{2} (1,064 sq mi)
- Website: https://www.african-parks.org/the-parks/pendjari

UNESCO World Heritage Site
- Part of: Beninese part of W-Arly-Pendjari Complex
- Criteria: Natural: (ix), (x)
- Reference: 749bis-002
- Inscription: 1996 (20th Session)
- Extensions: 2017

Pendjari National Park (French: Parc National de la Pendjari) lies in north-western Benin, adjoining the Arli National Park in Burkina Faso. Named for the Pendjari River, the national park is known for its wildlife and is home to some of the last populations of big game like the African forest elephant, lion, hippopotamus, African buffalo, and various antelopes in West Africa. The park is also famous for its richness in birds.

The park covers an area of 2,755 km^{2} (1,064 sq mi) and is part of the WAP Complex (W-Arli-Pendjari), a large protected area in Benin, Burkina Faso and Niger. Hills and cliffs in the Atakora range are visible from the park.

In March 2009, the park was tentatively nominated for UNESCO's World Heritage Site program, and in July 2017, it was officially inscribed as a UNESCO World Heritage Site as part of a transnational extension of the WAP Complex.

== Ecology ==
The rocky cliffs of the area are sparsely wooded with Burkea africana, Detarium microcarpum, Lannea acida, Sterculia setigera and Combretum ghasalense. On the deep soils of some of the summits and the Atakora escarpment, there is a greater variety of plant species with Isoberlinia doka and Afzelia africana. The Pendjari River is surrounded by forest. The park includes both the Sudanian and Guinean savannas, with areas of grassland dominated by Acacia sieberiana and Mitragyna inermis or Terminalia macroptera. The annual rainfall is approximately 1,100 millimetres (43 inches). The park is open year-round, although from June to November, rainfall can be heavy, and certain parts of the park may be inaccessible.

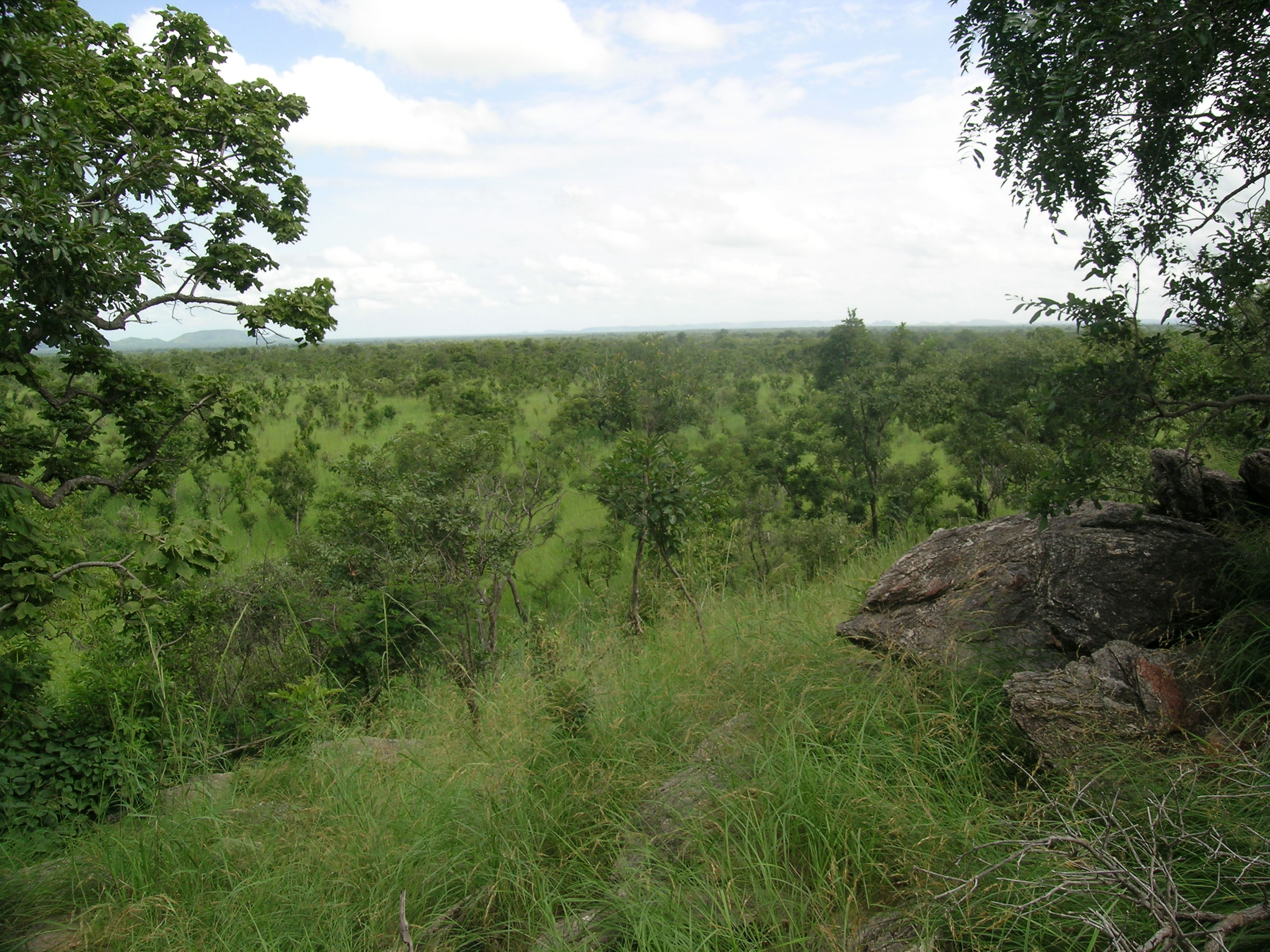
Landscape

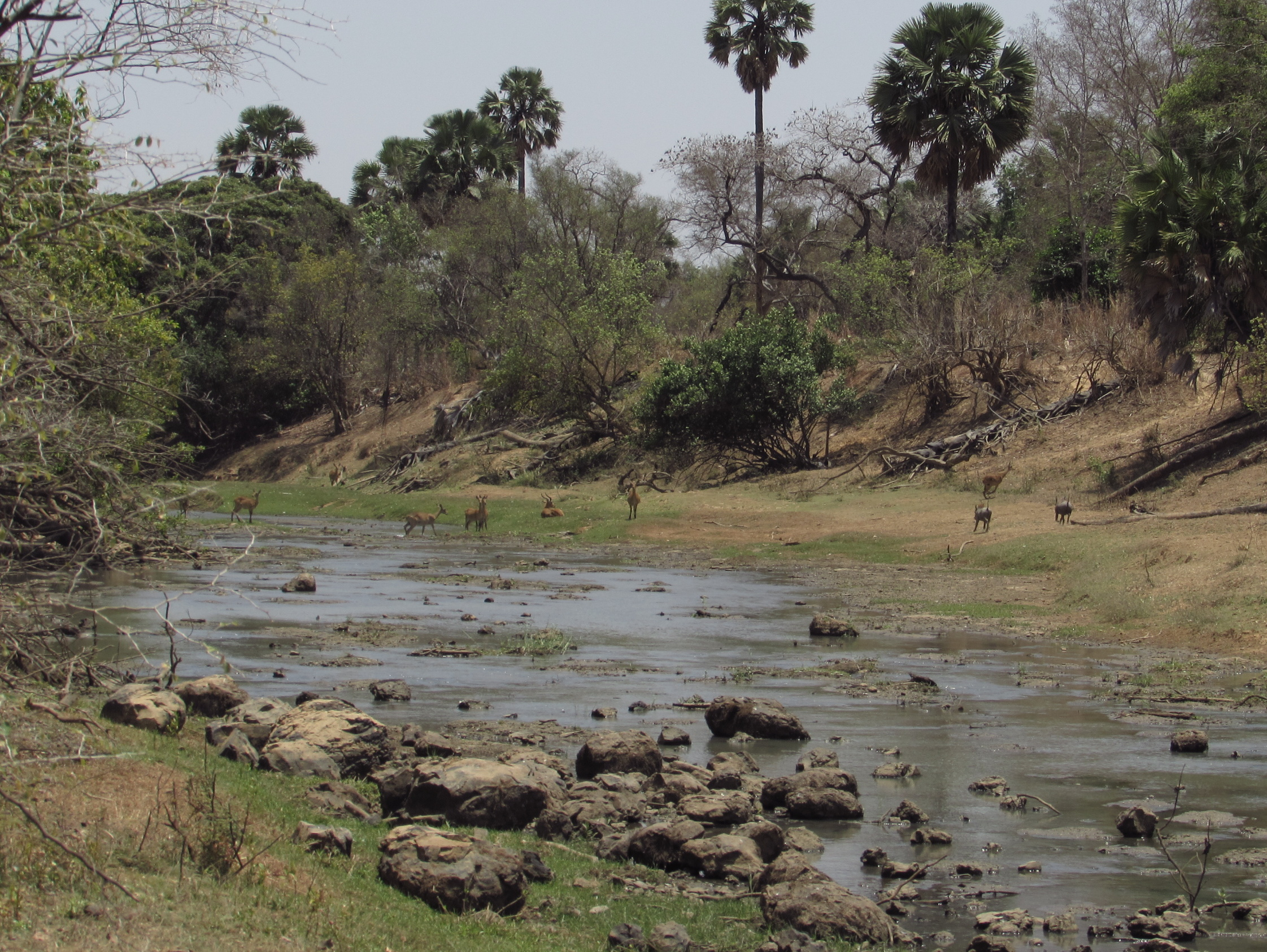
Pendjari river within the national park in dry season: right Burkina Faso, left Benin

== Fauna and flora ==
=== Mammals ===
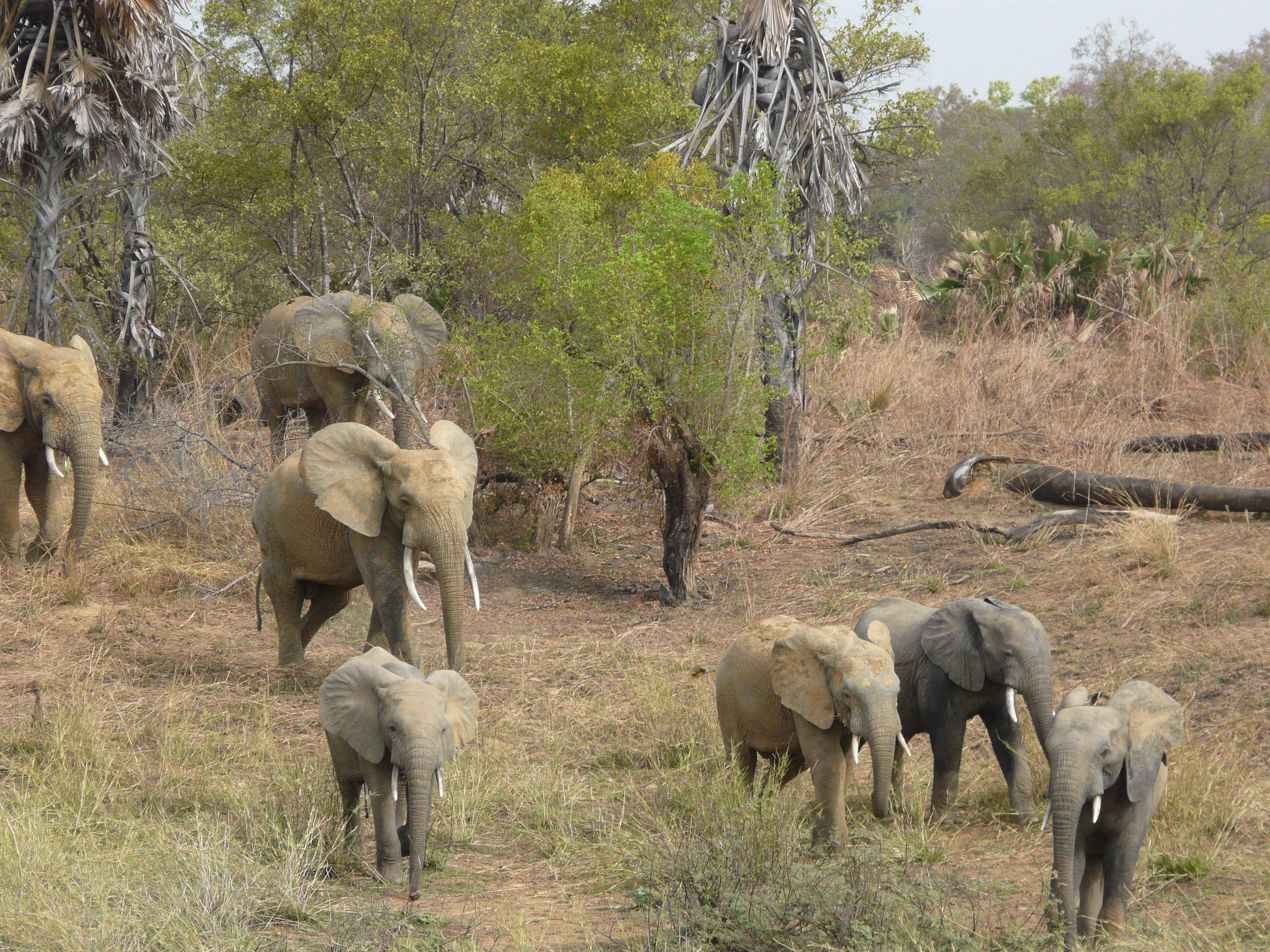
The Pendjari is an important refuge for the African elephant in West Africa

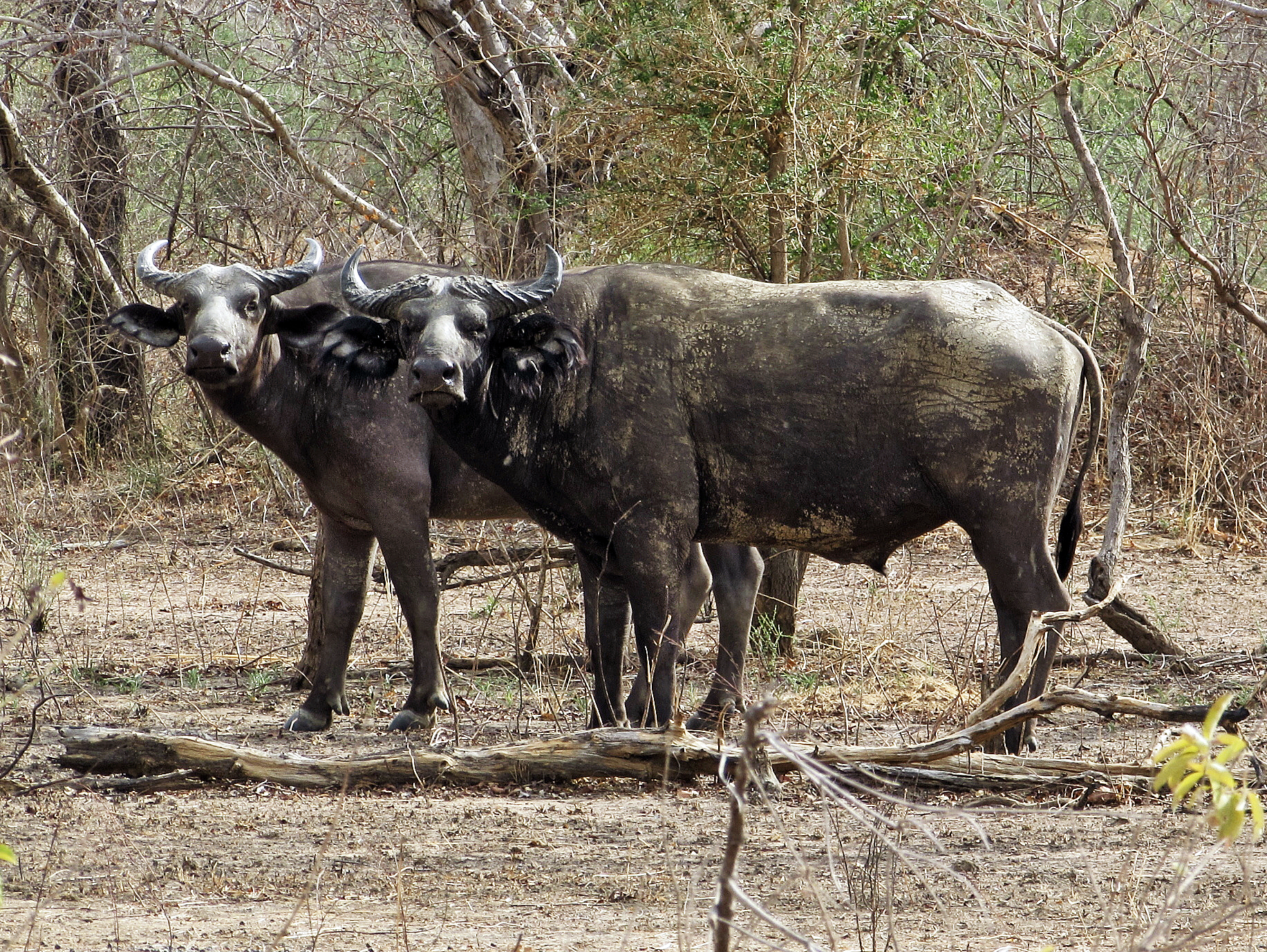
African buffaloes

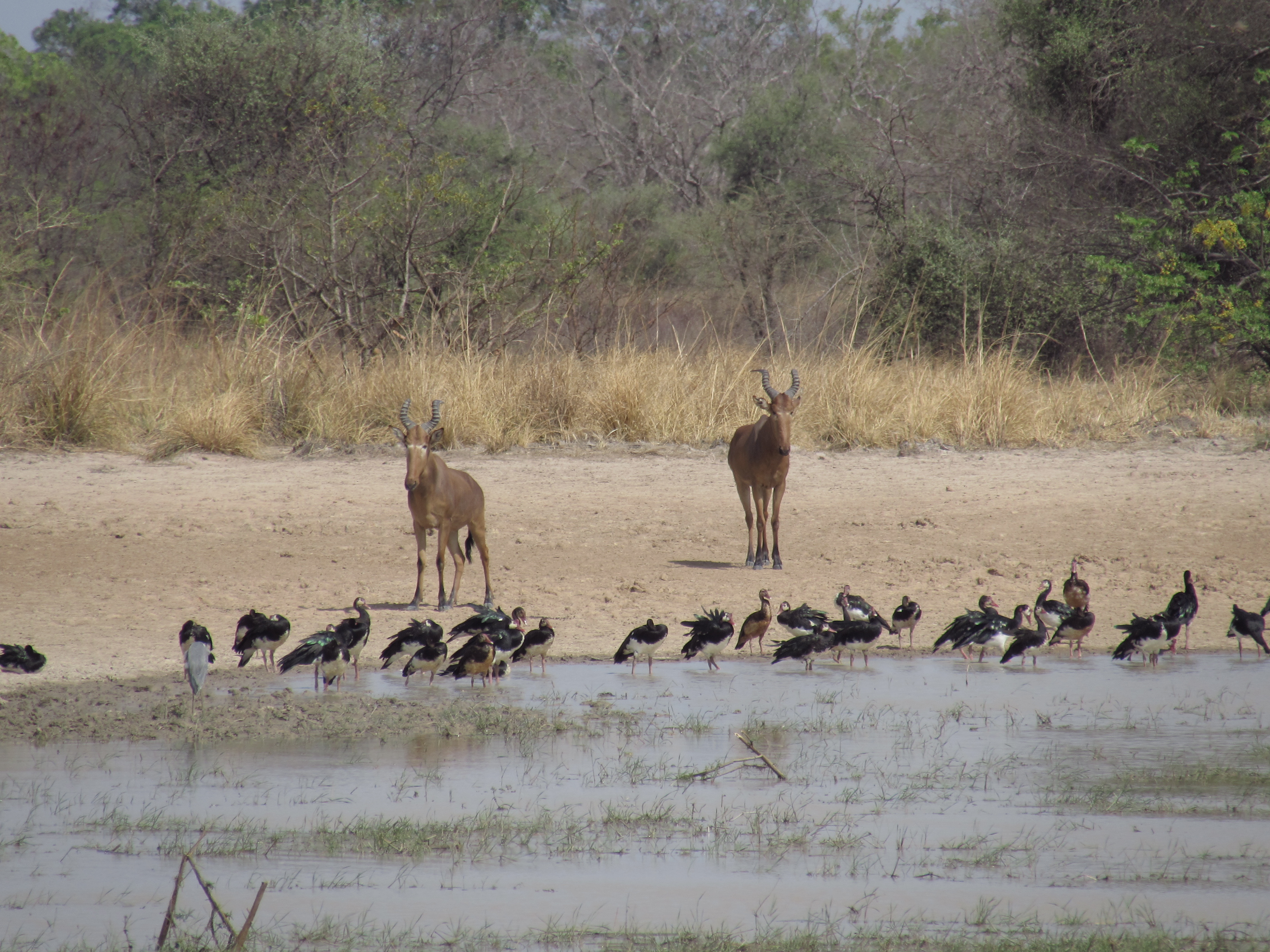
Western hartebeest

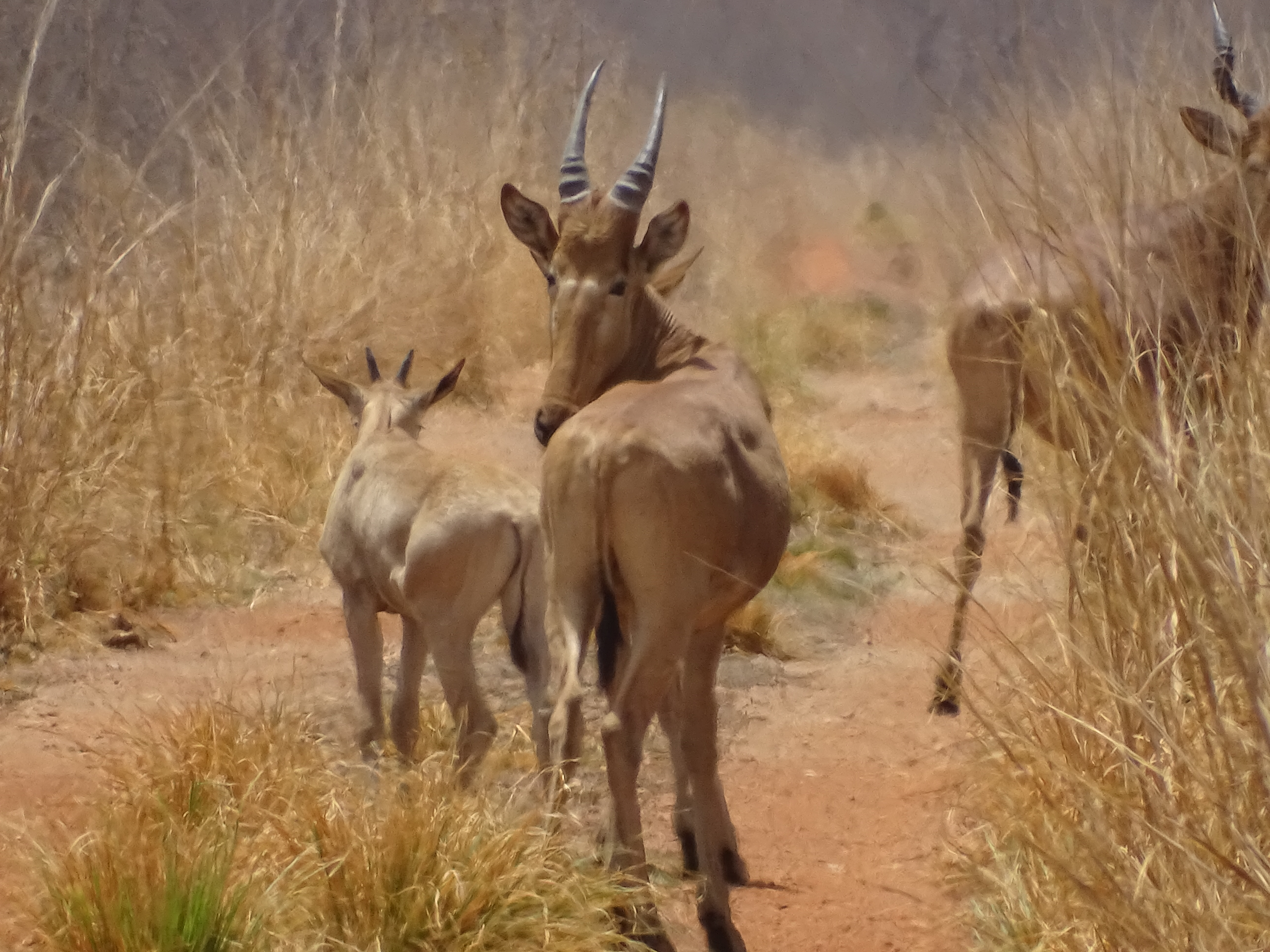
Hartebeest in Pendjari

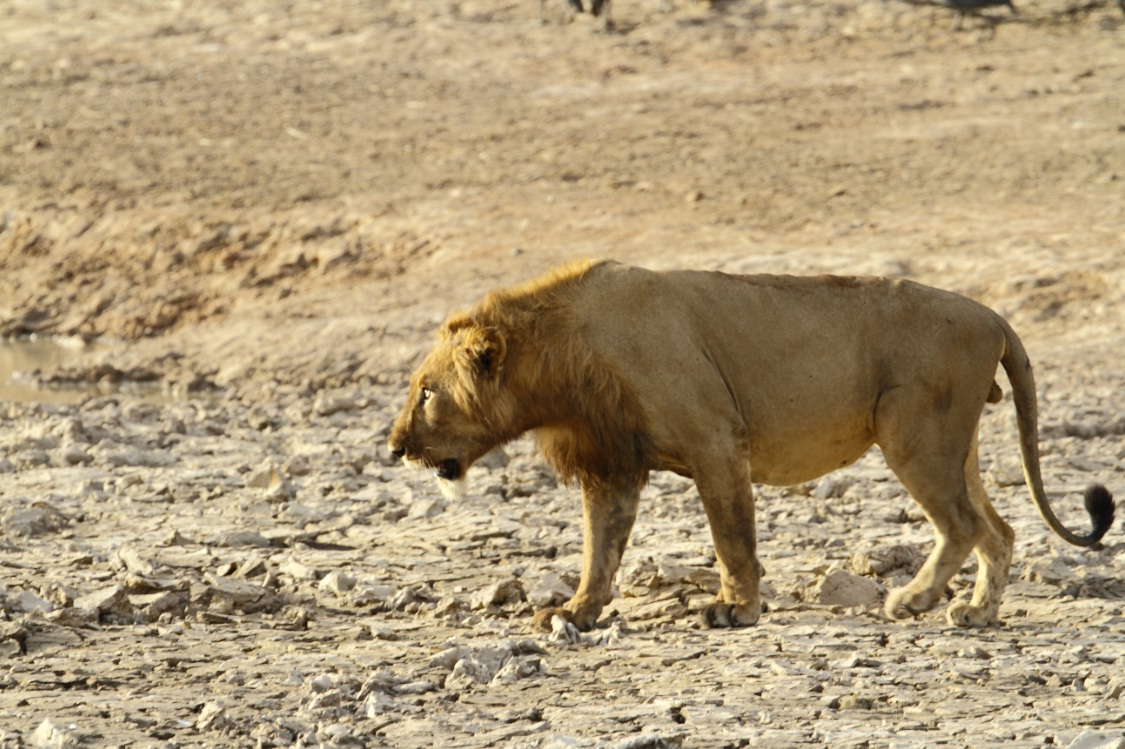
Lion in Pendjari National Park

Pendjari National Park has a relatively large population of elephants, which was stable over the last decades and counted more than 800 individuals between 2005 and 2010. The WAP Complex's elephant population is more than 3,800, making it the largest elephant concentration in all of western Africa. The second largest species of the park is the hippopotamus. There are also large populations of several other large herbivores like African buffalo (Syncerus caffer brachyceros; c. 2,700 animals in 2000), western hartebeests (Alcelaphus buselaphus major; c. 1,500 in 2000), roan antelope (c. 2,000 in 2000), kob antelope (c. 2,600 in 2000), and warthogs. Some other antelope species like korrigum (Damaliscus lunatus korrigum), bushbuck, and reedbuck are relatively rare. Smaller bovids are the red-flanked duiker, oribi, and common duiker. Primates are represented by the olive baboon, patas monkey, and tantalus monkey.

One of the rarest large predators in the protected area is the Northwest African cheetah (Acinonyx jubatus hecki). As of 2007, there were only about 5–13 individuals left in the national park and neighboring W National Park. By 2009, the lion (Panthera leo leo) population in the WAP Complex comprised about 100 animals and was possibly the largest in West Africa at the time.

The endangered West African wild dog (Lycaon pictus manguensis) was recorded in Pendjari National Park during a survey in April 2000, as well as African leopard, spotted hyena, side-striped jackal, and African civet.

The number of waterbucks (Kobus ellipsiprymnus defassa) decreased from about 3,000 in the 1970s to 120 in 2004.

=== Birds ===
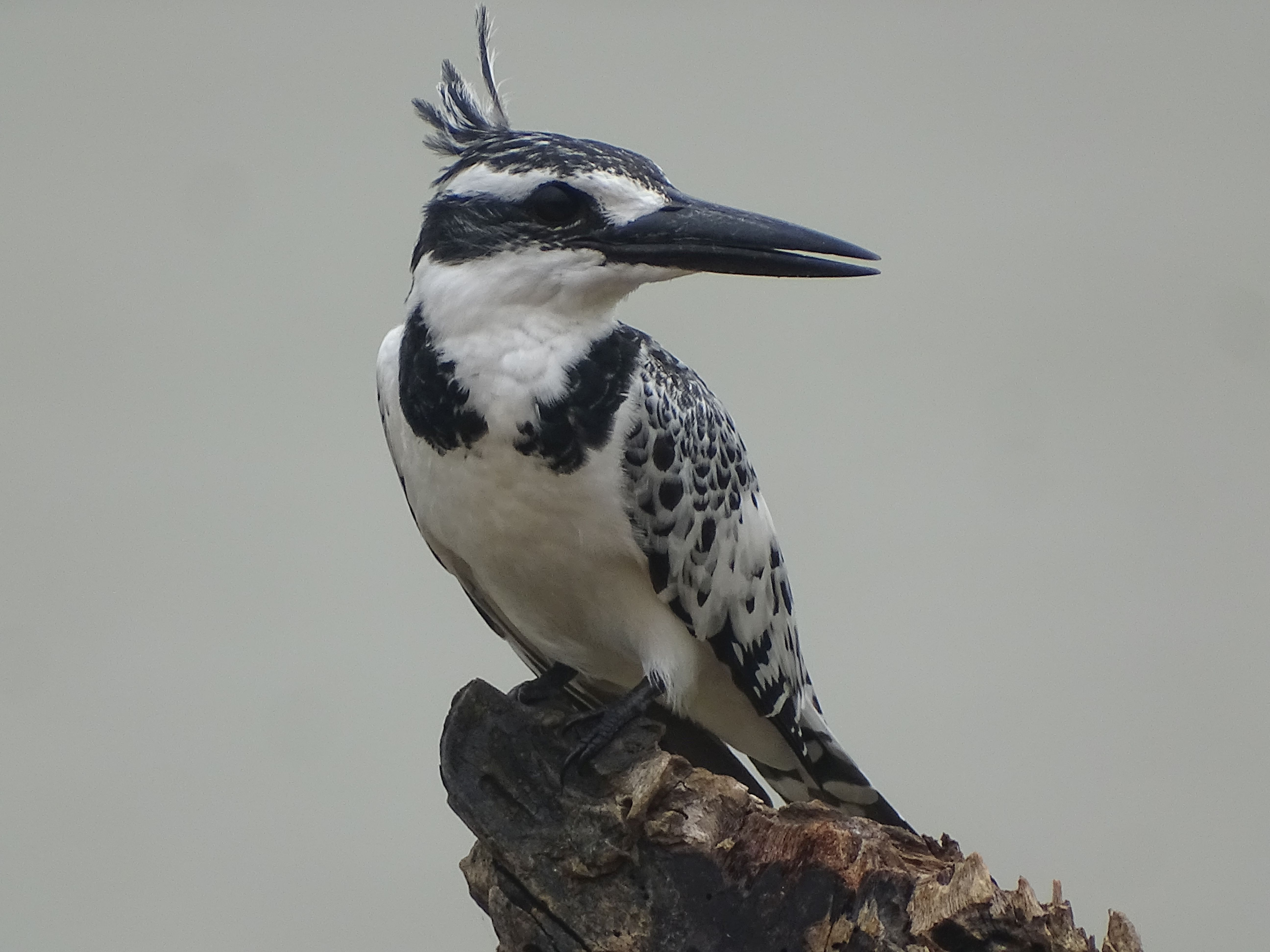
Pied Kingfisher (Ceryle rudis) in Pendjari

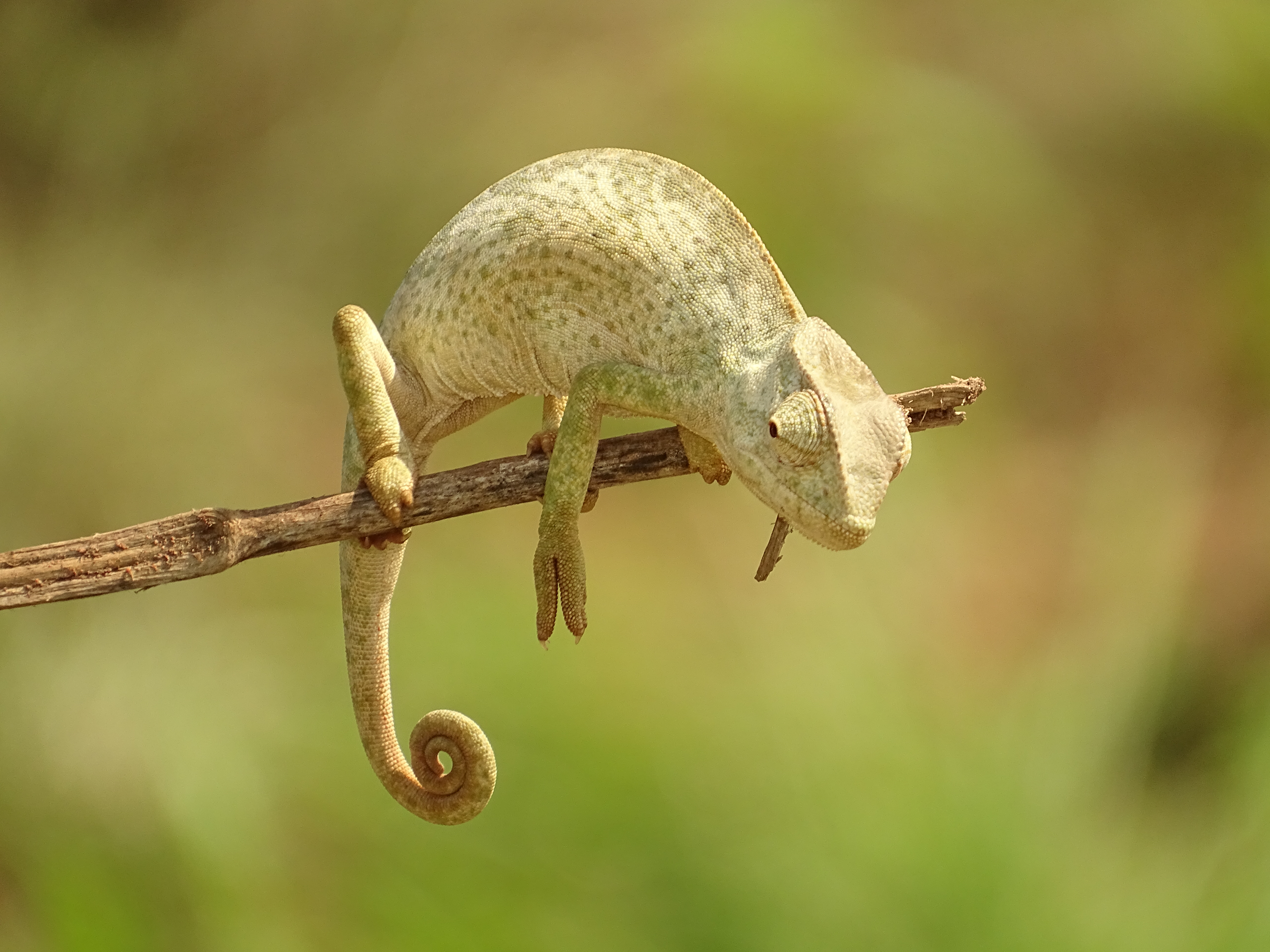
Chamaeleo senegalensis in the Pendjari Reserve

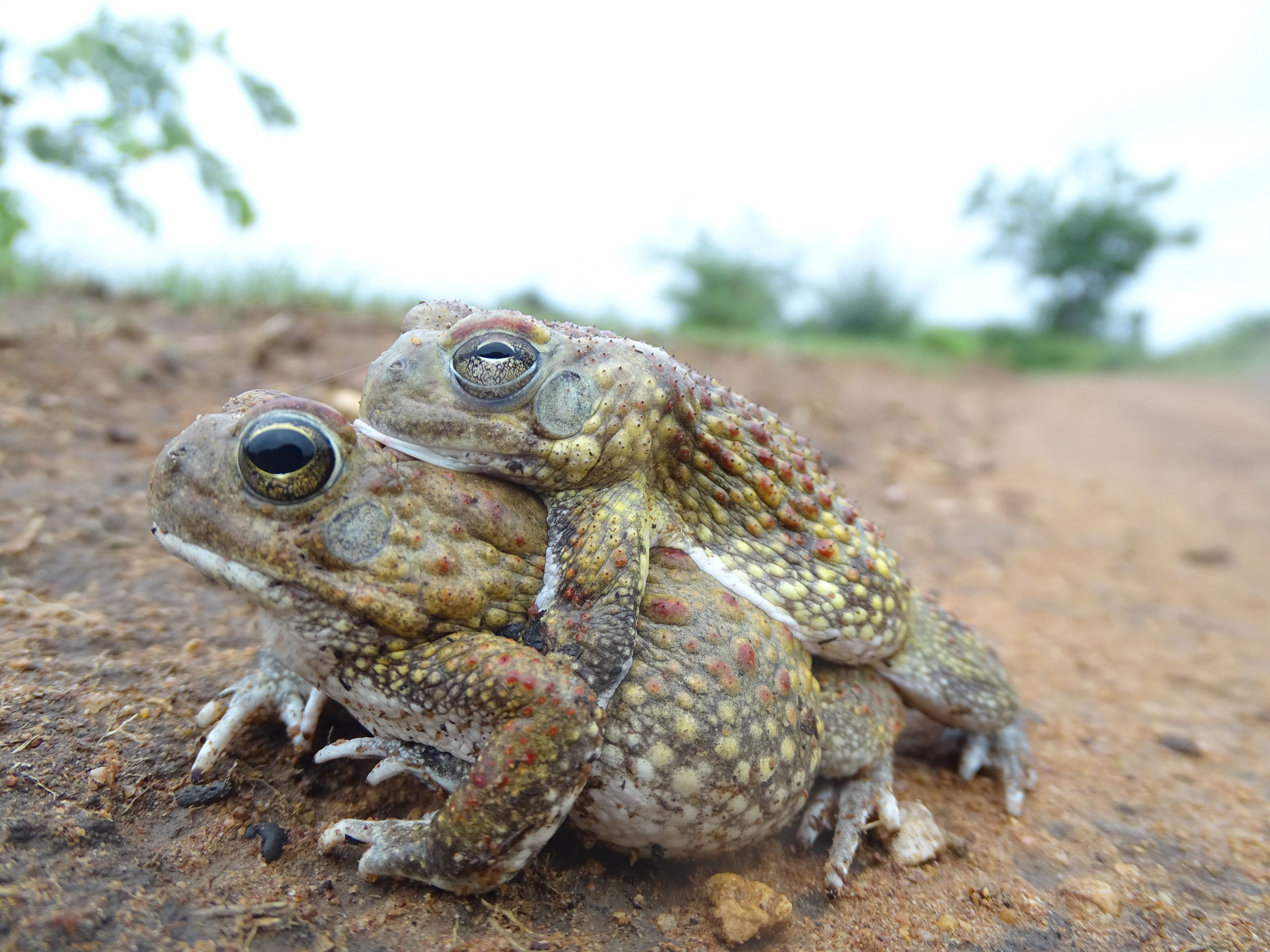
African toads in the Pendjari Reserve

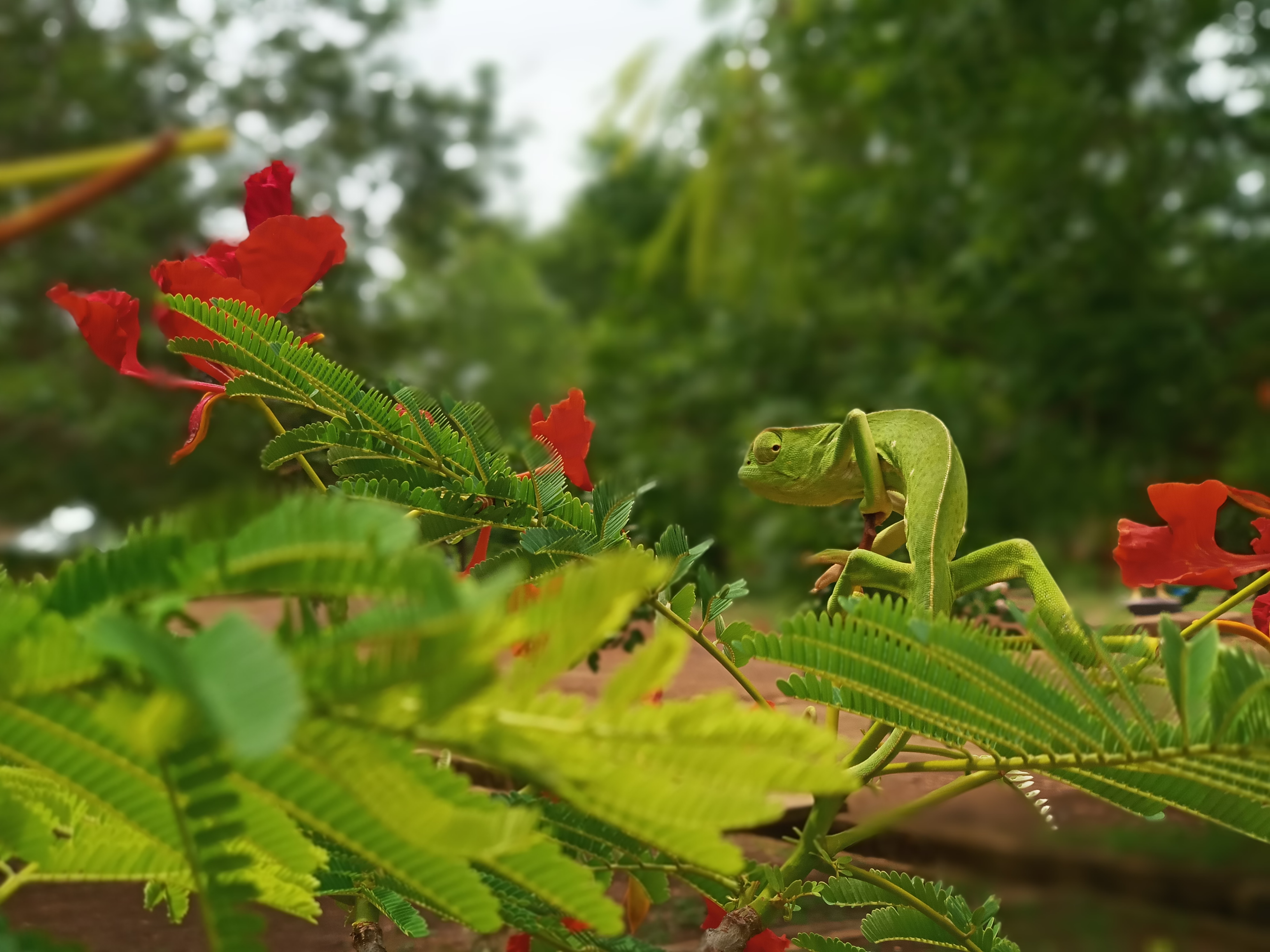
Chameleon on a Delonix regia

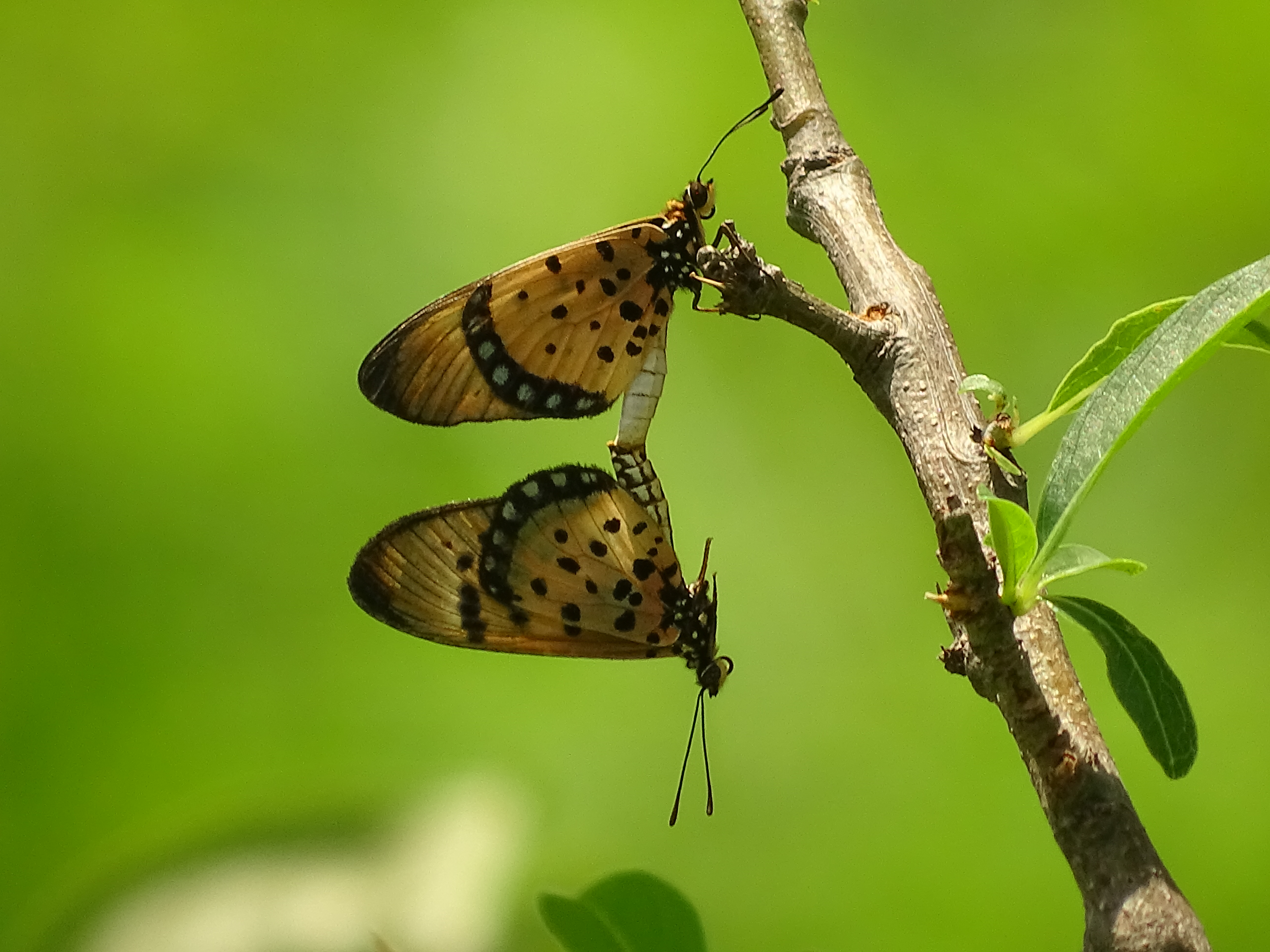
Acraea caecilia in Pendjari

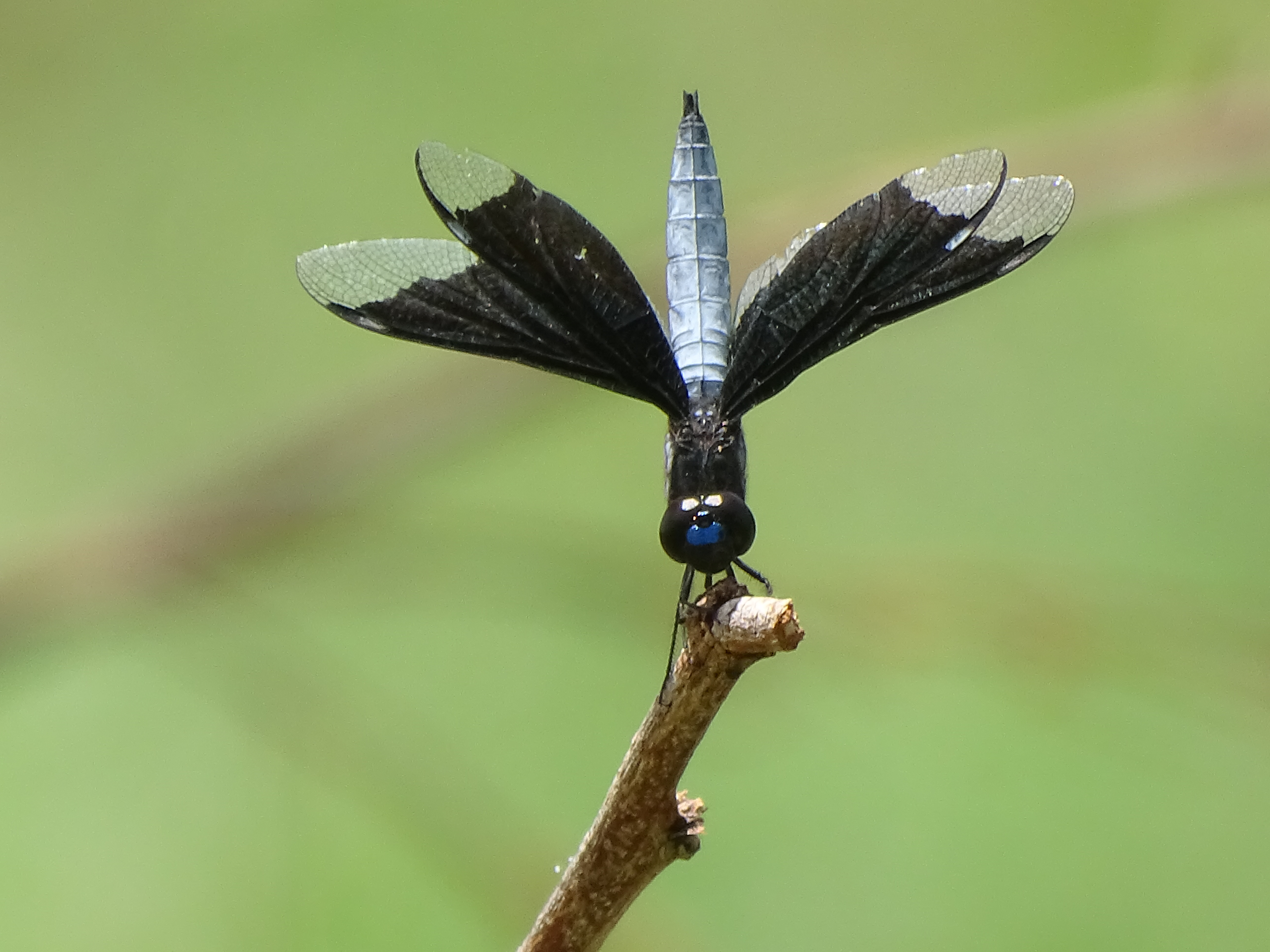
Palpopleura lucia in Pendjari

The hooded vulture (Necrosyrtes monachus) is resident in the protected area, but in small numbers.

The park is renowned for its abundance of bird species. Some 300 different species are present. Pallid harrier (Circus macrourus) and lesser kestrel (Falco naumanni) are occasionally recorded and there are a few isolated records for lappet-faced vulture (Torgos tracheliotus). Fox kestrel (Falco alopex) is not uncommon, while the African swallow-tailed kite (Chelictinia riocourii) is a not uncommon dry season visitor. The booted eagle (Hieraaetus pennatus) has also been recorded here. BirdLife notes that "the Pendjari is notable for large conspicuous species such as African openbill stork (Anastomus lamelligerus), Abdim's stork (Ciconia abdimii), saddle-billed stork (Ephippiorhynchus senegalensis), and seasonally, flocks of up to 60 European white storks (Ciconia ciconia). The African fish eagle (Haliaeetus vocifer) and Pel's fishing-owl (Scotopelia peli) can also be found.

Among the more notable species recorded are pied-winged swallow (Hirundo leucosoma), white-crowned robin-chat (Cossypha albicapillus), Botta's wheatear (Oenanthe bottae), familiar chat (Cercomela familiaris), white-fronted black-chat (Myrmecocichla albifrons), mocking cliff-chat (Thamnolaea cinnamomeiventris), common rock thrush (Monticola saxitilis), Senegal eremomela (Eremomela pusilla), blackcap babbler (Turdoides reinwardtii), red-winged pytilia (Pytilia phoenicoptera), black-rumped waxbill (Estrilda troglodytes), bush petronia (Petronia dentata) and Togo paradise-whydah (Vidua togoensis).

Grey tit-flycatcher (Myioparus plumbeus) has been recorded as well as several other species of the undergrowth. White-throated greenbul (Phyllastrephus albigularis) has been recorded at Tanguiéta and the white-throated francolin (Francolinus albogularis), a rare resident, has been spotted in farmland south of Natitingou. South of the park there is a large semi-protected zone known in French as La zone cygnetique de la Pendjari where a number of other species have been spotted. The national park and the bird habitat is protected by the government in Benin.

Other bird species include:

- Red-thighed sparrowhawk (Accipiter erythropus) resident 1998
- Senegal parrot (Poicephalus senegalus) resident 1998 - A3
- Violet turaco (Musophaga violacea) resident 1998 - A3
- Blue-bellied roller (Coracias cyanogaster) resident 1998 - A3
- Red-throated bee-eater (Merops bulocki) resident 1998 - A3
- Bearded barbet (Lybius dubius) resident 1998 - A3
- Yellow-billed shrike (Corvinella corvina) resident 1998 - A3
- Piapiac (Ptilostomus afer) resident 1998 - A3
- Yellow penduline-tit (Anthoscopus parvulus) resident 1998 - A3
- Fanti saw-wing (Psalidoprocne obscura) resident 1998
- Pied-winged swallow (Hirundo leucosoma) resident 1998 - A3
- Senegal eremomela (Eremomela pusilla) resident 1998 - A3
- Blackcap babbler (Turdoides reinwardii) resident 1998 - A3
- Purple glossy-starling (Lamprotornis purpureus) resident 1998 - A3
- Bush petronia (Petronia dentata) resident 1998 - A3
- Red-winged pytilia (Pytilia phoenicoptera) resident 1998 - A3
- Red-faced pytilia (Pytilia hypogrammica) resident 1998 - A3
- Lavender waxbill (Estrilda caerulescens) resident 1998 - A3
- Black-rumped waxbill (Estrilda troglodytes) resident 1998 - A3
