= Atacora Department =

Department of Benin

Atakora
- Department
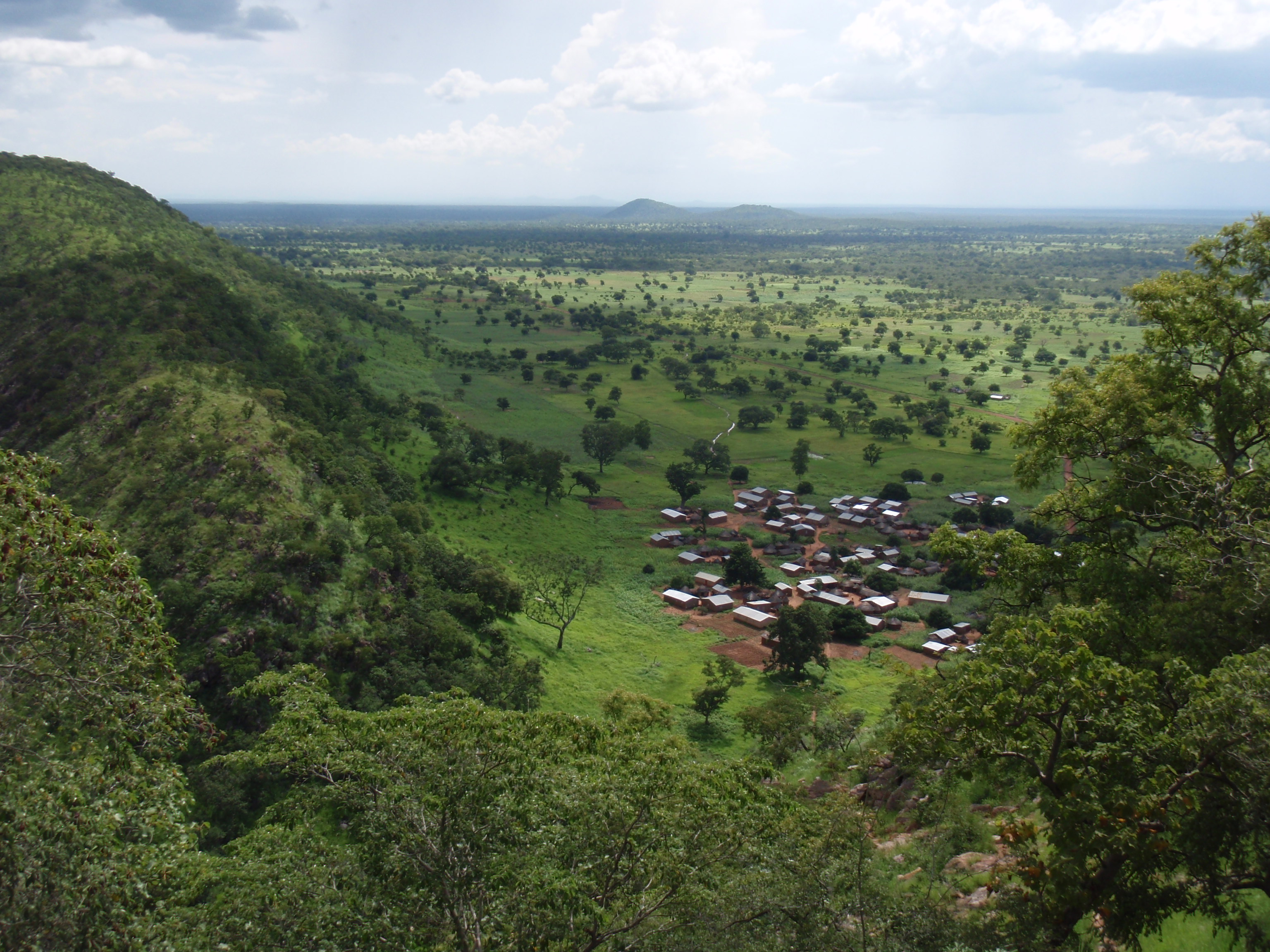

- Map highlighting the Atakora Department
- Coordinates: 10°18′N 1°23′E
- Country: Benin
- Capital: Natitingou

Area
  - Total: 20,499 km^{2} (7,915 sq mi)

Population (2013 census)
  - Total: 769,337
  - Density: 37.530/km^{2} (97.203/sq mi)
- Time zone: UTC+1 (WAT)

Atakora [a.ta.kɔ.ʁa] (also spelled Atacora, named for the Atakora Mountains) is the northwesternmost department of Benin. Externally it borders Togo to the west and Burkina Faso to the north; internally it borders the departments of Alibori, Borgou and Donga. Major towns in the Atakora include Natitingou and Tanguiéta, and the major tourist areas include the Tata Somba houses, Pendjari National Park, and various waterfalls. The department of Atakora was bifurcated in 1999, with its southern territory removed to form the newly created Donga Department. The capital of Atakora Department is Natitingou, which lies among the Atakora Mountains.

As of 2013, the total population of the department was 772,262, with 380,448 males and 391,814 females. The proportion of women was 50.70%. The total rural population was 62.80%, while the urban population was 37.20%. The total labour force in the department was 170,333, of which 27.20% were women. The proportion of households with no level of education was 72.80%.

== Geography ==
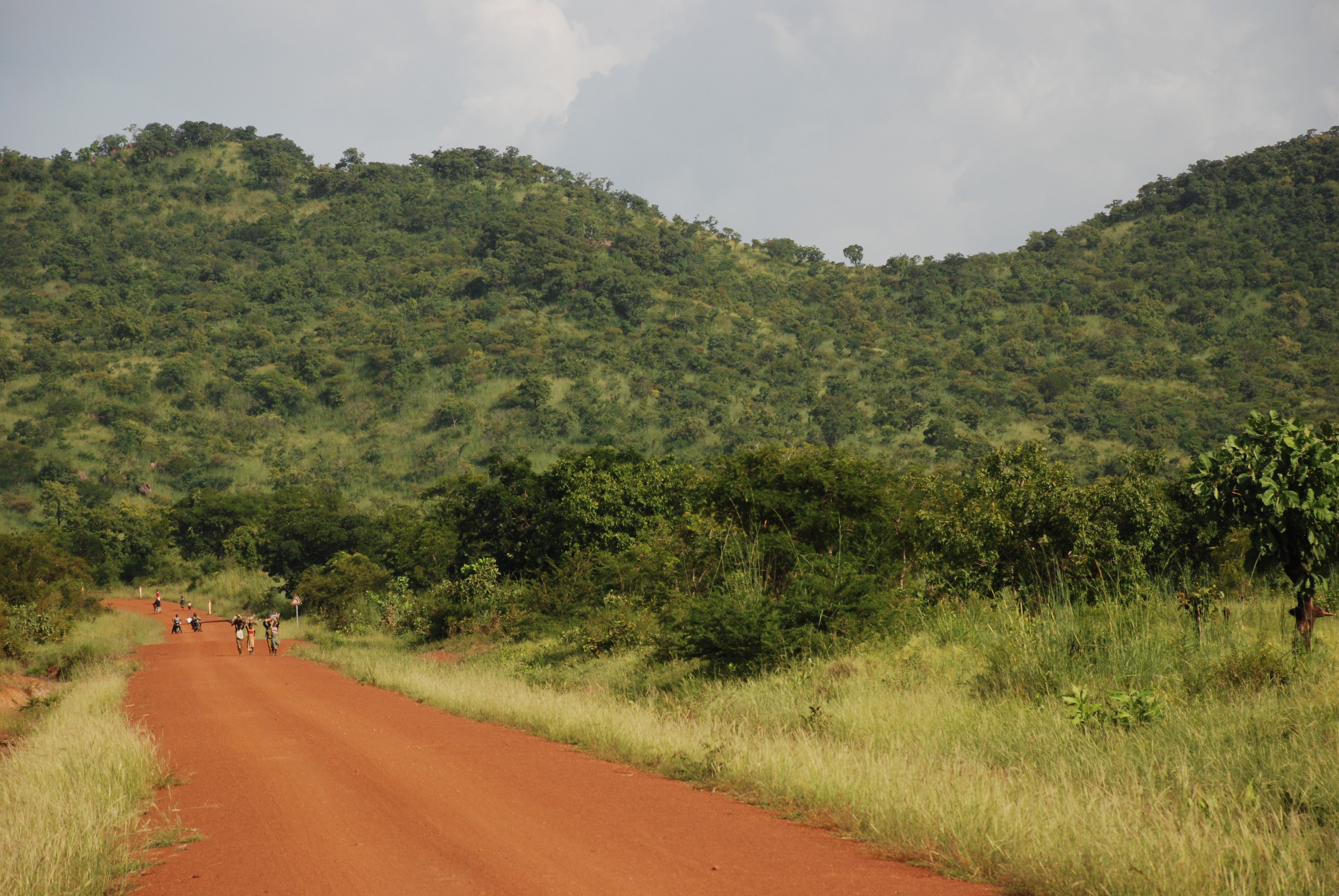
Unpaved road in Atakora, near the border with Togo

Atakora Department is located in the northwest of Benin, bordering Burkina Faso to the north, Alibori Department and Borgou Department to the east, Donga Department to the south and Togo to the west. The terrain is mainly forested mountains, from which two tributaries of the Niger River - the Mékrou River and the Pendjari River - originate. Part of the Atakora Mountain Range is located in the region and continues into northeastern Togo. The mountain range is characterised by numerous dambo areas (shallow wetlands) and head swamps. The bulk of the Pendjari National Park lies within Atakora.

The northern regions of Benin receive one season of rainfall from May to September, compared to the southern regions which receive two spells of rain from March to July and September to November. Harmattan winds blow from the northeast during the months of December to March. The country receives an average annual rainfall of around 1,200 mm (47 in).

=== Settlements ===
Natitingou is the departmental capital; other major settlements include Boukoumbé, Birni, Firou, Kouandé, Péhunco, Porga, Tanguiéta and Toucountouna.

== Demographics ==
Religious census
Religion	Percent(%)
Muslim	26.9%
Methodist	1.8%
Vodoun	6.3%
Catholic	20.7%
Celestial	0.8%
Other Christian	1.6%
Other Traditional	18%
Other	1.2%
Other Protestant	2.4%

According to Benin's 2013 census, the total population of the department was 772,262, with 380,448 males and 391,814 females. The proportion of women was 50.70%. The total rural population was 62.80%, while the urban population was 37.20%. The proportion of women of childbearing age (15 to 49 years old) was 21.80%. The foreign population was 10,395, representing 1.30% of the total population in the department. The labour force participation rate among foreigners aged 15–64 years was 32.20%. The proportion of women among the foreign population constituted 47.90%. The number of households in the department was 107,599 and the average household size was 7.2. The intercensal growth rate of the population was 3.10%.

Among women, the average age at first marriage was 19.1 and the average age at maternity was 27.8. The synthetic index of fertility of women was 5.6. The average number of families in a house was 1.6 and the average number of persons per room was 1.7. The total labour force in the department was 170,333, of which 27.20% were women. The proportion of households with no level of education was 72.80% and the proportion of households with children attending school was 42.70%. The crude birth rate was 39.0, the general rate of fertility was 179.20 and the gross reproduction rate was 2.80.

The main ethnolinguistic groups in the Department are the Tammari (also known as the Betammaribe, or Somba), Waama and Dendi people. Other groups include the Bariba, Biali, Chakosi (also known as Anufo), Gurma, Lama, Mbelime, Nateni, Ngangam, Notre, Miyobe and Yom.

== Administrative divisions ==
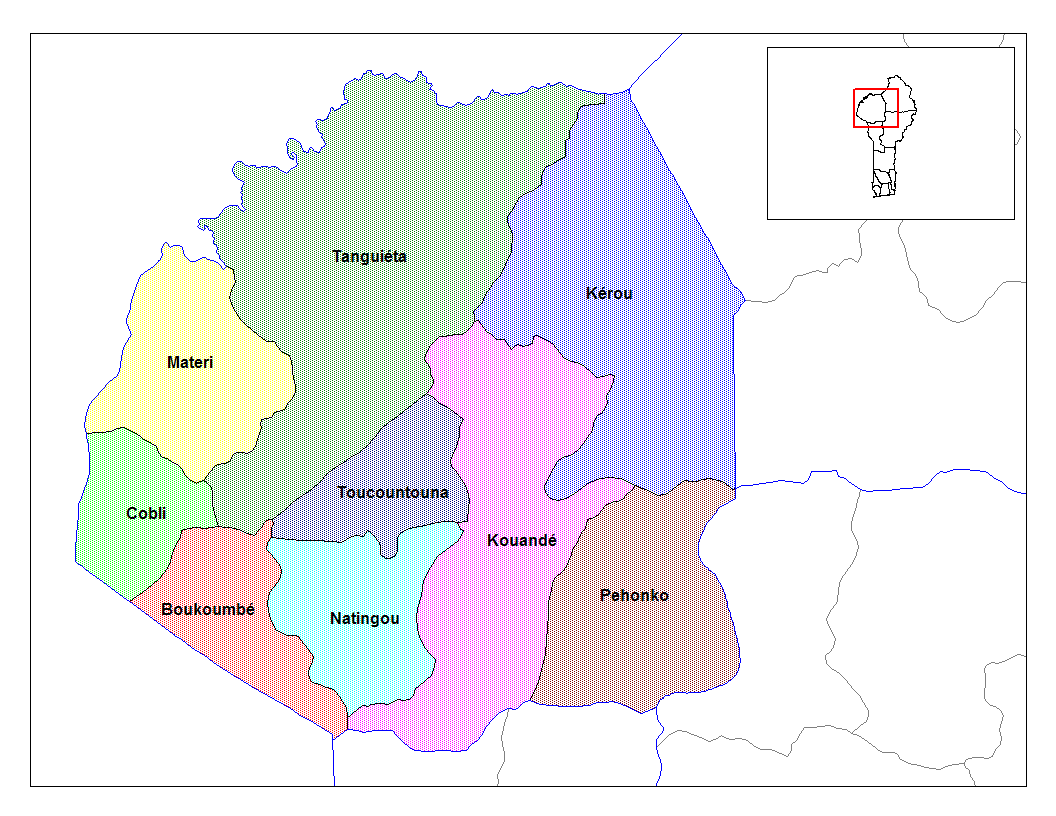
Communes of Atakora

The department of Atakora was bifurcated in 1999, when its southern territory was transferred to the newly created Donga Department. The capital of the department is Natitingou. Atakora is subdivided into nine communes, each centred at one of the principal towns: Boukoumbé, Cobly, Kérou, Kouandé, Matéri, Natitingou, Pehonko, Tanguiéta and Toucountouna.

Benin originally had six administrative regions (départements), which have now been bifurcated to make 12. Each of the deconcentrated administrative services (directions départementales) of the sectoral ministries takes care of two administrative regions. A law passed in 1999 transformed the sous-prefectures, the lowest level of territorial administration, into local governments. Municipalities and communal councils have elected representatives who manage the administration of the regions. The latest elections of the municipal and communal councils were held in June 2015.
