= Anii language =

Niger–Congo language spoken in Ghana, Togo and Benin

Anii
- Basila
- Native to: Ghana, Togo, Benin
- Ethnicity: Makɔ-Makua/Bakɔ-Bakua
- Native speakers: 49,000 (2011–2012)
- Language family: Niger–Congo?: Atlantic–Congo; Kwa; Anii–Adere; Anii
- Dialects: Four main groups
- Writing system: Latin

Language codes
- ISO 639-3: blo
- Glottolog: anii1245
- ELP: Anii

The Anii is a Guan language (sometimes called Bassila or Baseca, also known as Oji-Ouji, Ouinji-Ouinji, Winji-Winji, though this is derogatory) which is spoken in Benin, central-eastern Togo and central eastern Ghana by Makɔ-Makua or Bakɔ-Bakua clan. It is part of the geographic group of Ghana Togo Mountain languages (formerly known as the Togorestsprachen or Togo Remnant languages) of the Kwa branch of Niger–Congo.

There are four major dialect groups in Anii, which are quite different from each other, even to the point that some of the dialects are not mutually intelligible. These differences may include variation in phonology (including tonology), lexicon, syntax, and semantics. There are significant differences from village to village within groups, particularly regarding pronunciation.

The name "Anii" was chosen in May 1979 by the Anii people as the official name for the language because it is a word that is common to all the Anii dialects. It is an interjection meaning roughly ‘do you hear?’, or ‘do you understand?’ Some of the older names have colonial or derogatory connotations and should no longer be used, and just be kept for reference.

== Classification ==
Anii is classified within the Niger–Congo language family, one of the largest language families in Africa. Within this family, it belongs to the Atlantic–Congo branch and is further grouped within the Kwa languages.

Languages in the Kwa group are primarily spoken in parts of West Africa, including Benin, Togo, Ghana, and Ivory Coast. Anii shares linguistic features with other Kwa languages, including aspects of vocabulary, phonology, and grammar.

== History ==
The Anii people are a diverse group with approximately eighteen villages along the border region of Benin and Togo. Benin has the largest Anii population, with fifteen villages and 33,600 Anii, while Togo has three villages comprising roughly 12,300 residents and a significantly smaller community in Oti and Ashanti region Ghana. The Anii people are not originally from neither Togo nor Benin but are believed to have emigrated, likely from the border area between Ghana and Togo sometime before the 19th century. The only closely related language is Adele spoken in that border area.

The different villages developed in relative isolation and developed their own names and dialect of Anii. The dialects were also likely affected by language contact, as the different Anii villages have origin stories that tell of different mixes of language groups founding each village. It was not until 1979 and the Sous-Commission National Anii that the language was officially called Anii and a written alphabet was established. A full orthography was officially accepted by the community in 2012, and is being regularly used and taught.

=== Origin and use today ===
Although there are relatively few Anii speakers, the language has a comparatively strong presence among its speakers while the lingua franca, French is not as prevalent. Anii is the main language used in public and private domains. A majority of the younger population still use Anii as their everyday language, and children are learning it as a first language. Most Anii speakers also speak other languages like French, Tem (Kotokoli), or other surrounding languages.

==== Language risk ====
Although there are relatively few speakers and within the speaker population there are many dialects, the language is becoming more popular among the population. This is due in part to the work of the NGO LINGO-Benin, which works hard to publish both original and translated works in Anii, and also facilitates classes for speakers to learn to read and write. According to Ethnologue the language is classified as a 5 (developing).

==== Religion ====
In general, the Anii people ascribe to the Muslim faith, but Benin is very religiously diverse and there are also people of other faiths living in Anii communities.

Depending on the village: Arabic, Anii, Kotokoli, Tchamba or a combination of Arabic and Anii are used for preaching, and daily service. However, private prayer is always spoken in Anii.

== Dialects ==
There are four to five distinct dialect clusters that are geographically based. These dialects are distinct based on each group's relative physical isolation from one another and contact with other regional languages.

Additionally, there are significant differences in pronunciation between villages of the same dialect cluster. Each dialect has a varied set of rules including its lexicon, phonology, syntax, and TAM semantics. This has made it extremely difficult for linguists to document a unified set of grammatical rules for Anii.

There are two areas of nearly universal similarity between the dialects: the tone and pitch of the speaker and the influence of the lingua franca English and French.

=== Dialects of villages ===
- Giseda (Bassila, Benin) - the most prominent dialect, especially by adults
- Gifolanga (Guiguizo, Benin)
- Frinyio ka gija (Frignion Village)
- Gikodowaraja (Kodowari village)
- Gipenesulja (Kemetou Penezoulou, Benin)
- Gipenelanja (Penelan, Benin)
- Naagayili ka gija (Nagayile village)
- Gibodija (Bodi, Benin)
- Gibayaakuja (Bayakou, Benin)
- Gideenguja (Dengou village)
- Ngmeelang ka gija (Agerendebou village)
- Giborokoja (Mboroko, Benin)
- Yaari ka gija (Yari, Benin)

== Phonology ==
Anii has 23 consonant phonemes and 11 vowel phonemes. It is tonal with both a high and low tone.

=== Vowels ===
Anii has a strong system of vowel harmony based on the feature [ATR] (Advanced Tongue Root). This means that half of the vowels are pronounced with the root of the tongue pushed forwards, and half are not. Every word that is not a compound word has vowels that match for this feature. That is, all non-compound words have only vowels with the [ATR] feature, or vowels without it—there is no mixing.

	+ATR			-ATR		
	Front	Central	Back	Front	Central	Back
Close	i		u	ɪ	ɨ	ʊ
Mid	e	ǝ	o	ɛ		ɔ
Open					a	

Vowel length is contrastive in Anii, but it is unclear which vowels this applies to.

=== Tone ===
The Bassila dialect, on which the most linguistic research has been done, has two phonological tone levels, low and high, and exhibits both grammatical and lexical tone.

== Writing system ==
Anii uses a modification of the Latin script that includes symbols from the International Phonetic Alphabet.

Anii alphabet
Upper case	A	Ǝ	B	C	Ɖ	E	Ɛ	F	G	Gb	H	I	Ɩ	J	K	Kp	L	M	N	Ny	Ŋ	Ŋm	O	Ɔ	P	R	S	Sh	T	U	Ʊ	W	Y
Lower case	a	ǝ	b	c	ɖ	e	ɛ	f	g	gb	h	i	ɩ	j	k	kp	l	m	n	ny	ŋ	ŋm	o	ɔ	p	r	s	sh	t	u	ʊ	w	y

== Morphology ==
Like other languages of the Central-Togo group, Anii has a robust system of noun classes, contrasting with the reduced or absent systems of surrounding languages, of which it has 14. Research is considering the possibility that Anii is a tenseless language. There is a far-past marker that may be a tense or a temporal remoteness marker. New research is investigating the function of reality status in Anii clauses, documenting the syntax of negation, and beginning to research the structure of dialects other than Gisida.

== Vocabulary ==
See Deborah Morton's dissertation The temporal and Aspectual Semantics and Verbal Tonology of Gisida Anii.

=== Noun list ===
This list contains English translated nouns with the accompanying tone pattern.

=== Verb list ===
This list contains English and French translated verbs with the accompanying tone pattern.

== See also ==
- Ghana–Togo Mountain languages
