= Kpartao =

- Village
- Location in Benin
- Coordinates: 9°20′N 1°28′E
- Country: Benin
- Department: Donga Department
- Commune: Bassila
- Time zone: UTC+1 (WAT)

Kpartao is a village in the commune of Bassila in the Donga Department of northwestern Benin. It is one of over 50 villages within the commune, which is the third largest commune in Benin by area, covering 5,661 square kilometres (2,186 sq mi).

== Geography ==
Kpartao is located in the northwestern part of the Donga Department, in a region characterized by savanna landscapes and a Sudano-Guinean climate. The commune of Bassila receives between 1,200 and 1,300 mm of rainfall annually, with a rainy season from May to October and a dry season from November to April. The vegetation in the region is diverse, including gallery forests, open forests, dense dry forests, wooded savannas, and grasslands.

The commune of Bassila borders Togo to the west and shares boundaries with the communes of Ouaké and Djougou to the north, Tchaourou and Ouèssè to the east, and Bantè and Glazoué to the south. Mont Sokbaro, widely cited as the highest point in Benin, is located within Bassila commune on the border with Togo.

== Administration ==
The commune of Bassila is administratively divided into four arrondissements: Alédjo, Bassila (the chief town), Manigri, and Pénéssoulou. Like other villages in Benin, Kpartao has a local governance structure consisting of a village chief (chef de village or délégué) and council who are responsible for mediating disputes and organizing village development projects.

== Demographics ==
The commune of Bassila had a population of 130,091 at the 2013 census. The main ethnic groups in the commune include the Yoruba (Nagot), who constitute approximately 57% of the population, and the Anii (also known as Basseda), who represent about 33%. Other ethnic groups include the Kotokoli (3%), as well as smaller communities of Lokpa, Ditammari, Fula, Fon, and Adja.

== Economy ==
Agriculture is the primary economic activity in the commune of Bassila, employing more than 80% of the working population. Major food crops include maize, yams, and cassava, while important cash crops include cotton, cashews, and shea nuts. Livestock rearing, particularly of poultry and small ruminants such as sheep and goats, complements agricultural activities.

== See also ==
- Bassila
- Donga Department
