= Biguina =

- Village
- Location in Benin
- Coordinates: 8°44′N 1°38′E
- Country: Benin
- Department: Donga Department
- Commune: Bassila
- Arrondissement: Bassila
- Time zone: UTC+1 (WAT)

Biguina is a community or village in the commune of Bassila in the Donga Department of northwestern Benin. It is located near the border with Togo and it sits on Benin's Route Nationale 3, one of the two main north-south highways in the country.

Biguina is composed of four small villages. The four villages are situated in a line along the highway, each spaced one to two kilometers apart. From north to south, Biguina's constituent villages are Koiwali, Biguina 1 (Akpassa), Biguina 2, and Biguina 3. Biguina 1, usually known to the residents as Akpassa, is the largest of the four villages. It is home to a majority of the total population, to the village's weekly market, and to the community health center.

Biguina 1 is located 28 km south of the commune capital town of Bassila. Koiwali is 2 km to the north of Biguina 1. Biguina 2 is a kilometer south of Biguina 1 and Biguina 3 is a further 2 km. Other nearby villages include Prekete (12 km to the south), Aworo (6 km to the north), Kamboli, Togo (8 km to the southwest), and Balanka, Togo (10 km to the northwest).

== Population ==
The population of Biguina is uncertain, but likely in the range of 5,000 to 8,000 people. Approximately half of the total population resides in Biguina 1. Biguina 3 is the next largest of the four villages, with perhaps a quarter of the population, while Biguina 2 and Koiwali are both small.

== Ethnic composition ==
A large majority of residents of Biguina are ethnic Lokpa (or Lukpa) who speak Lukpa. The Lokpa are closely related to the Kabye people who live in adjacent areas of Togo and speak Kabiye. Both Lukpa and Kabiye are members of the Gurunsi or Grusi branch of the Gur language group. Gur languages are widely spoken across Burkina Faso, northern Ghana, northern Togo, and northwestern Benin.

Biguina also has a significant resident Fulani (or Fula; French: Peul or Peuhl; Fula: Fulɓe) population. The resident Fulani primarily live in small villages or encampments located in the farmlands to the east and west of the main villages. In addition to these two main ethnic groups, there are small minorities of ethnic Nago and Fon.

== History ==
Biguina was founded in the 1960s by Lokpa migrants from the Ouake area, the population center of the Lokpa ethnic group in Benin. Migrants cleared forest land and settled neighboring Aoro first, then settled Biguina later in the 1960s. The primary school in Biguina 1 was founded in 1972. Biguina 2, Biguina 3, and Koiwali were settled later.

== Institutions ==
Each of the four constituent villages of Biguina has a public primary school. There are two secondary schools, known as collèges d'enseignement général, or CEGs. CEG Sourou is located a kilometer north of Koiwali (at the far north end of Biguina). It was founded in 2004 to serve Biguina and Aoro. CEG Biguina is situated between Biguina 1 and Biguina 2. It was founded in 2010 to offer a more convenient location for students, most of whom walk to school. Both schools offer instruction through troisième classe, equivalent to ninth grade.

Biguina 1 has a community health center and an open-air village market, held every Tuesday. Each of four villages has a mosque. Biguina 1 has a Protestant evangelical church, a Catholic church, and a Christian Celeste church.

== Government ==
Biguina is part of the commune of Bassila and therefore falls under the jurisdiction of the mayor of Bassila.

Biguina also has a local governance structure, consisting of a village chief and council. The eight councillors (conseillers) and the chief (chef de village or délégué) each represent one of the neighborhoods (quartiers) of the village. They are elected locally by the villagers. Their most frequent responsibility is to mediate and resolve disputes. Additionally, they are responsible for organizing and supervising projects relating to the development of the village. For instance, the village council organized the construction of a new secondary school, CEG Biguina, in 2010.

Biguina 2, Biguina 3, and Koiwali have discussed splitting from Biguina 1 in 2014 to elect their own village councils and chiefs.

== Economy ==
Biguina is a rural village with a primarily agricultural economy. It is a located in an agriculturally rich region of Benin. Nearly every crop that is grown in Benin is grown in Biguina. The major food crops are corn, African yams, and manioc. Corn and cashews are the two most important cash crops. Other important local crops include soybeans, beans, rice, sorghum, millet, tomatoes, okra, and cotton. Minor crops (in terms of cash value) include mangoes, bananas, papayas, shea nuts, palm nuts, Rônier palm fruits, and various leaf vegetables.

Commerce is also an important sector of the local economy. There are several small stores, and the village hosts an open-air market every Tuesday.

Biguina does not have electricity. Local homes do not have indoor running water, but the village does have a clean water supply. Biguina has a central diesel-powered water pump, which fills a water tower located on high ground in Biguina 2. From the tower, water flows to spigots located around the village.
