= Benin–Togo border =

International border

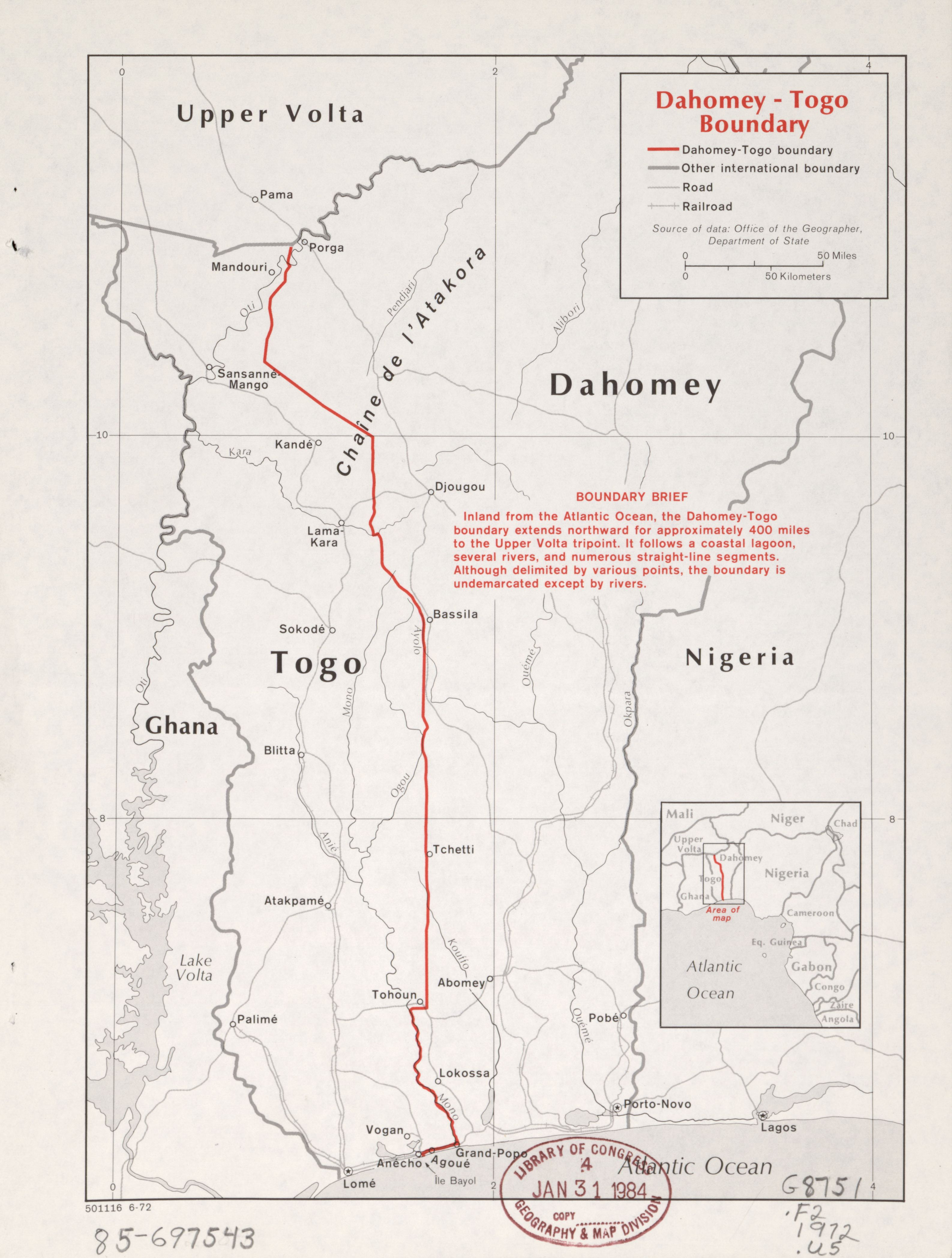
Map of the Benin-Togo border

The Benin–Togo border is 651 km (405 mi) in length and runs from the tripoint with Burkina Faso in the north down to the Bight of Benin in the south.

== Description ==
The border starts in the north at the tripoint with Burkina Faso. It then proceeds overland to the southwest, veers to the southeast in the vicinity of Grando Namoni, and then turns sharply southwards in the vicinity of Gando, Benin. The boundary then proceeds southwards in a roughly straight line, occasionally utilising rivers such as the Ogou and, in the southernmost stretches, the Mono. Mont Sokbaro, widely cited as the highest point of Benin, lies almost on the border here. In the far south the border turns sharply to the west before reaching the Atlantic Ocean, providing Benin with a thin strip of territory encompassing Grand-Popo and Hilakondji.

== History ==
During the second half of the 19th century France began creating small trading settlements on the West African coast. In 1851 a treaty of friendship was signed between France and the Kingdom of Dahomey in what is now southern Benin, followed by the creation of a protectorate in Porto Novo in 1863. The colony of Dahomey (the former name of Benin) was declared in 1894, and later included within the much larger federal colony of French West Africa (Afrique occidentale française, abbreviated AOF) in 1899. The 1880s saw an intense competition for territory in Africa by the European powers, a process known as the ‘Scramble for Africa’. Germany began taking an interest in acquiring African colonies, signing a treaty with chiefs along the coast of modern Togo in July 1884; France recognised this claim the following year. The southernmost section of the border was agreed upon by procès-verbal in 1887, with the rest of boundary being settled by a Franco-German protocol of July 1897. A more detailed boundary treaty was agreed upon in September 1912.

During the First World War German Togoland was conquered by Allied forces and split into British and French mandates. By plebiscite, British Togoland was incorporated into the Gold Coast colony in 1956, which gained independence as Ghana the following year. The remainder of Togolese territory remained under French control, however France had also initiated a process of decolonisation, which culminated in the granting of broad internal autonomy to its African territories in 1958 within the framework of the French Community. French Togoland declared complete independence as Togo on 27 April 1960, followed by Dahomey on 1 August, and their mutual frontier became an international one between two independent states.

== Settlements near the border ==
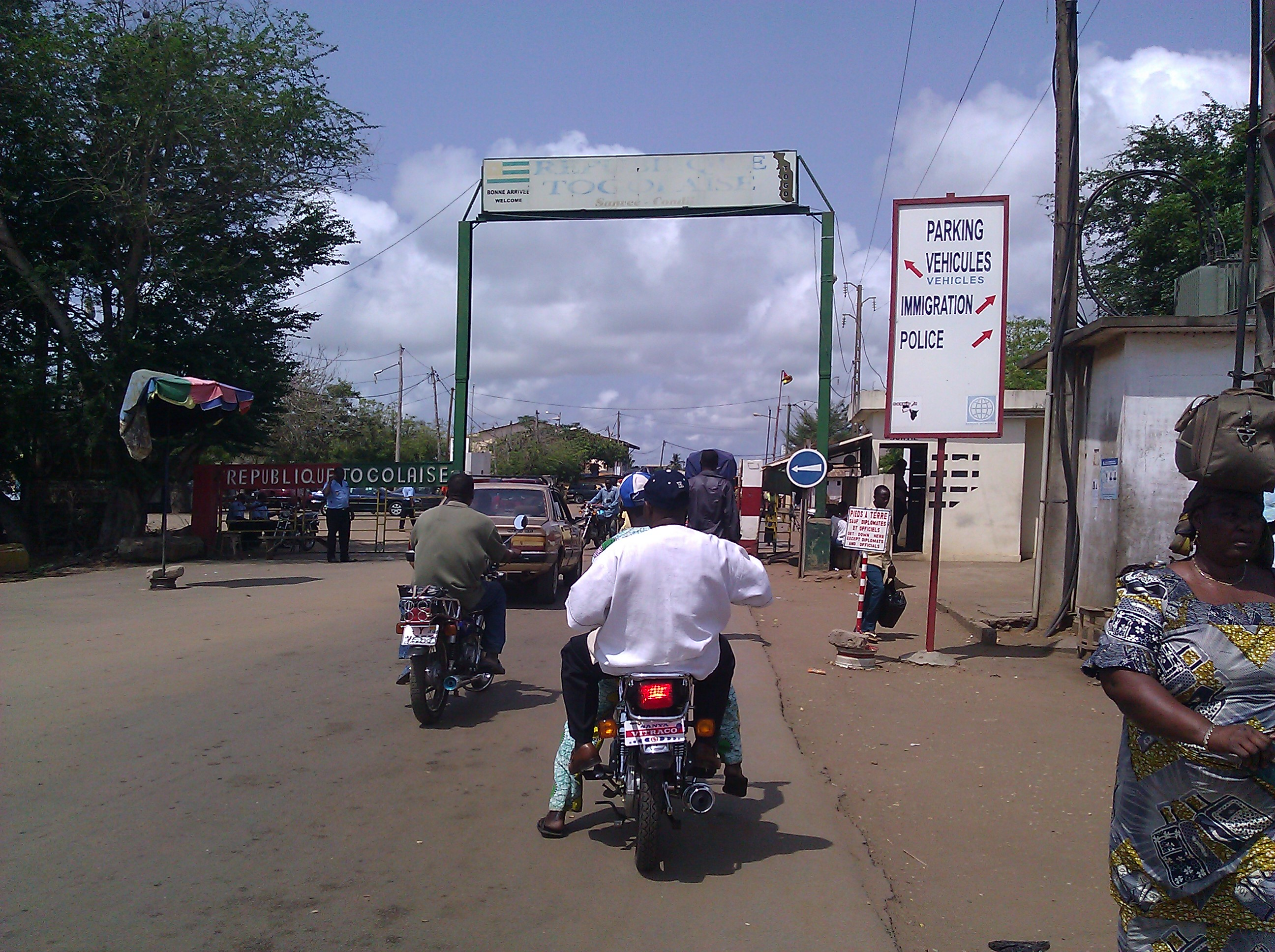
The border post at Hilakondji

=== Benin ===
- Séméhoun-Nanbouli
- Kountouri
- Boukonmbé-Zongo
- Kossokouangou
- Tchoumi-Tchoumi
- Boukombe
- Kounadougou
- Dompago
- Ouaké
- Doumé
- Séméré
- Aledjo-Koura
- Penelan
- Bassila
- Tchetti
- Aplahoué
- Athiémé
- Adjaha
- Agbanaken
- Agoué
- Grand-Popo
- Hilakondji

=== Togo ===
- Mandouri
- Grando Namoni
- Gando
- Sola
- Pagouda
- Kpékplémé
- Kétao
- Balanka
- Koussountou
