= Niala =

Niala may refer to:

- Niala, Benin
- Niala, Iran
- Niala, Mali
- Tropical Storm Niala

== See also ==
- Nyala (disambiguation)
