= Djougou Teachers' Training College =

École Normale d'Instituteurs de Djougou
- École Normale d'instituteurs de Djougou
- Abbreviation: ENI-Djougou
- Type: Public educational institution
- Headquarters: Djougou, Donga, Benin
- Parent organization: Ministry of Maternal and Primary Education of Benin

The Djougou Teachers' Training College (ENI-Djougou) is a public teachers' training college in Djougou, located in the Donga Department of Benin. It is under the supervision of the Ministry of Maternal and Primary Education of Benin.

== See also ==
- Allada Normal School for Teachers
