= Boutou, Benin =

Boutou
- Village
- Location in Benin
- Coordinates: 9°25′N 1°31′E
- Country: Benin
- Department: Donga Department
- Commune: Bassila
- Arrondissement: Alédjo
- Time zone: UTC+1 (WAT)

Boutou, Benin is a village in the commune of Bassila in the Donga Department of western Benin.
