= Akarade =

- Village
- Location in Benin
- Coordinates: 9°21′N 1°25′E
- Country: Benin
- Department: Donga Department
- Commune: Bassila
- Arrondissement: Alédjo
- Time zone: UTC+1 (WAT)

Akarade is a village in the commune of Bassila in the Donga Department of western Benin. It is located near the border with Togo.

== What kind of heart ==
Akarade is located in Basila in the province of Alejo. It is a village in the mountains since 6 June 2015.
