= Health in Benin =

Benin faces a number of population health challenges. Apart from modern medicine, traditional medicine plays a big role too.

The Human Rights Measurement Initiative finds that Benin is fulfilling 59.2% of what it should be fulfilling for the right to health based on its level of income. When looking at the right to health with respect to children, Benin achieves 77.5% of what is expected based on its current income. In regards to the right to health amongst the adult population, the country achieves 81.5% of what is expected based on the nation's level of income. Benin falls into the "very bad" category when evaluating the right to reproductive health because the nation is fulfilling only 18.5% of what the nation is expected to achieve based on the resources (income) it has available.

== Water supply and sanitation ==
According to the Joint Monitoring Program of the World Health Organization and UNICEF, three quarters of the Beninese population had access to an improved water source in 2008, whereas 12% had access to improved sanitation. The share rose from 63% concerning water and from 5% concerning sanitation in 1990. Coverage in urban areas is considerably higher than in rural areas.

Access to Water and Sanitation in Benin (2008)
		Urban (41% of the population)	Rural (59% of the population)	Total
Water	Improved water source	84%	69%	75%
Water	Piped on premises	26%	2%	12%
Sanitation	Improved sanitation	24%	4%	12%

Wastewater treatment is extremely rare in Benin. In most cases, wastewater is not disposed appropriately. According to a 2001 national health survey, in the cities of Cotonou, Parakou and Porto-Novo, two out of 1,000 households dispose their wastewater in a correct way, while most of them discharge it directly into the nature or drains. This leads to pollution and can cause water-borne diseases like malaria and typhoid fever.

== Health status ==
=== Life expectancy ===
The 2014 CIA estimated average life expectancy in Benin was 61.07 years.

=== Infectious diseases ===
On 16 March 2020, the first COVID-19 case in the country was confirmed in Porto-Novo.

=== Maternal and child healthcare ===
The 2011 maternal mortality rate per 100,000 births for Benin is 410. This is compared with 468.9 in 2008 and 587.6 in 1990. The under 5 mortality rate, per 1,000 births is 121 and the neonatal mortality as a percentage of under 5's mortality is 27. In Benin the number of midwives per 1,000 live births is 4 and the lifetime risk of death for pregnant women is 1 in 43.

According to a 2013 UNICEF report, 13% of women had undergone female genital mutilation.

== See also ==
- Malaria in Benin
- COVID-19 pandemic in Benin
- HIV/AIDS in Benin
