= Kpendi =

- Village
- Location in Benin
- Coordinates: 9°19′N 1°35′E
- Country: Benin
- Department: Donga Department
- Commune: Bassila
- Elevation: 1,234 ft (376 m)
- Time zone: UTC+1 (WAT)

Kpendi is a village in the commune of Bassila in the Donga Department of western Benin. It is located just off the RNIE 3 highway.
