= Kemeni =

Kemeni may refer to:

- Kemeni, Benin
- Kemeni, Mali
