= Nampasso =

- Village
- Country: Mali
- Region: Ségou Region
- Cercle: Bla Cercle
- Commune: Korodougou
- Time zone: UTC+0 (GMT)

Nampasso is a village and seat of the commune of Korodougou in the Cercle of Bla in the Ségou Region of southern-central Mali.
