= Gaougado =

- Village
- Location in Benin
- Coordinates: 9°27′N 1°30′E
- Country: Benin
- Department: Donga Department
- Commune: Bassila
- Time zone: UTC+1 (WAT)

Gaougado is a village in the commune of Bassila in the Donga Department of western Benin.
