= Manigri =

Town in Benin

- Village
- Location in Benin
- Coordinates: 8°58′N 1°43′E
- Country: Benin
- Department: Donga Department
- Commune: Bassila
- Arrondissement: Manigri
- Time zone: UTC+1 (WAT)

Manigri is a small town and arrondissement in the commune of Bassila in the Donga Department of west central Benin. It is a south-eastern suburb of Bassila town.

Manigri has several surrounding towns and villages such as; Igbere, Kikele, Manigri Ikanni, Manigri Oke, Igbomakoro, Wannou and Aworo. According to the population census of 2013 by the National Institute of Statistics and Economic Analysis (INSAE), Manigri has 26,409 inhabitants.

Manigri, like many areas of Benin, is home to a constituent monarchy.
