= Assion =

- Village
- Location in Benin
- Coordinates: 8°37′N 1°41′E
- Country: Benin
- Department: Donga Department
- Commune: Bassila
- Time zone: UTC+1 (WAT)

Assion is a village in the commune of Bassila in the Donga Department of western Benin. It is located near the border with Togo.
