= Iyo =

Iyo may refer to:

== People ==
- Iyo Araki, Japanese nurse and nursing educator
- Iyo Matsumoto (松本 伊代; born 1965), Japanese pop idol
- Iyo Sky (イヨ・スカイ; born 1990), ring name of Japanese professional wrestler
- Iyo, legendary Japanese queen, also called Taiyoo

== Places ==
- Iyo, Benin. a village in the commune of Bassila
- Iyo, Ehime, a city located in Ehime Prefecture
- Iyo District, Ehime, a district located in Ehime Prefecture
- Iyo Province, a province of Japan in the area of northwestern Shikoku
- Iyo-Matsuyama Domain, a feudal domain
- Iyo-Yoshida Domain

== Other uses ==
- Iyo dialect, a dialect of Japanese spoken by people from Ehime Prefecture
- Iyo Bank Vertz, a Japanese women's softball team
- Iyotetsu, also called Iyo Railway Co., Ltd., the main transport provider in Matsuyama, Ehime, Shikoku, Japan
- Iyo language, New Guinea
- Iyo a character from Ani-Yoko
