= Ogougouworo =

- Village
- Location in Benin
- Coordinates: 9°22′N 1°29′E
- Country: Benin
- Department: Donga Department
- Commune: Bassila
- Time zone: UTC+1 (WAT)

Ogougouworo is a village in the commune of Bassila in the Donga Department of western Benin.The geographical coordinates are 9°22'N 1°29'E.
