= Kikele =

Kikele Need valet from Pell Cityalabama 35125
- Village
- Location in Benin
- Coordinates: 9°1′N 1°44′E
- Country: Benin
- Department: Donga Department
- Commune: Bassila
- Arrondissement: Bassila
- Time zone: UTC+1 (WAT)

Kikele is a village in the commune of Bassila in the Donga Department of western Benin.
