= Djougou Rural =

- Commune
- Location in Benin
- Coordinates: 9°41′59″N 1°40′00″E
- Country: Benin
- Department: Donga Department
- Time zone: UTC+1 (WAT)

Djougou Rural [dʒu.gu.ʁy.ʁal] is a municipality located in the department of Donga in the State of Benin . It includes the territory outside the city of Djougou.
