= Nayala =

Nayala may refer to:

- Nayala Province, a province in Boucle du Mouhoun Region, Burkina Faso
- Nayala, a village in Jamwa Ramgarh, Jaipur district, Rajasthan, India
- Nayala Fort and Nayala Palace, state-protected monuments in Rajasthan, India
- Nayala Paradi, a village in Daman Tehsil, Daman district, Daman and Diu, India

== See also ==
- Nyala (disambiguation)
