= Koulandougou =

- Commune
- Location in Mali
- Coordinates: 13°9′21″N 5°17′57″W
- Country: Mali
- Region: Ségou Region
- Cercle: Bla Cercle

Population (2009 census)
  - Total: 4,293
- Time zone: UTC+0 (GMT)

Koulandougou is a commune in the Cercle of Bla in the Ségou Region of Mali. The administrative center (chef-lieu) is the village of N'Toba.
