= Bayakou =

Bayakou may refer to:

- Bayakou (Benin), a village in Benin
- Bayakou (trade), latrine cleaners in Haiti
