= Dogue =

Dogue may refer to:

- Dogue de Bordeaux, a breed of dog
- Dogue, Benin
- Dogue, Virginia
- Doeg people, also known as Dogue
