= Katia (disambiguation) =

Katia is a feminine given name.

"Katia" may also refer to:

- Katia, Benin, a village
- Katia (film), a 1938 French drama starring Danielle Darrieux
- Battle of Katia, a World War I battle
- Hurricane Katia (2011)
- Kátia (footballer), Kátia Cilene Teixeira da Silva, Brazilian footballer

== See also ==
- Catia (disambiguation)
