= Catia =

Catia may refer to:

- Catia, Caracas, a neighbourhood of Caracas, Venezuela
- Catia La Mar, a town in Venezuela
- Catia (gens), a family in Ancient Rome
- Catia (skipper), a genus of butterfly
- CATIA, Computer Aided Three-dimensional Interactive Application

== See also ==
- Katia (disambiguation)
