= Diena, Mali =

Town and commune in southern–central Mali

Diena
- Commune and town
- Location in Mali
- Coordinates: 13°02′25″N 6°01′30″W
- Country: Mali
- Region: Ségou Region
- Cercle: Bla Cercle

Population (1998)
  - Total: 6,831
- Time zone: UTC+0 (GMT)

Diena is a small town and commune in the Cercle of Bla in the Ségou Region of southern-central Mali. In 1998 the commune had a population of 6,831.
