= Bodi, Benin =

Bodi
- Village
- Location in Benin
- Coordinates: 9°23′N 1°34′E
- Country: Benin
- Department: Donga Department
- Commune: Bassila
- Arrondissement: Pénéssoulou
- Time zone: UTC+1 (WAT)

Bodi is a village in the commune of Bassila in the Donga Department of western Benin. It is located near the border with Togo. Bodi has a population of 10,221.
