= Tiemena =

Coordinates: 13°07′N 6°55′W

- Commune and town
- Interactive map of Tiemena
- Country: Mali
- Region: Ségou Region
- Cercle: Bla Cercle

Population (1998)
  - Total: 8,115
- Time zone: UTC+0 (GMT)

Tiemena is a small town and commune in the Cercle of Bla in the Ségou Region of southern-central Mali. As of 1998 the commune had a population of 8,115.
