= Copargo =

- Commune and city
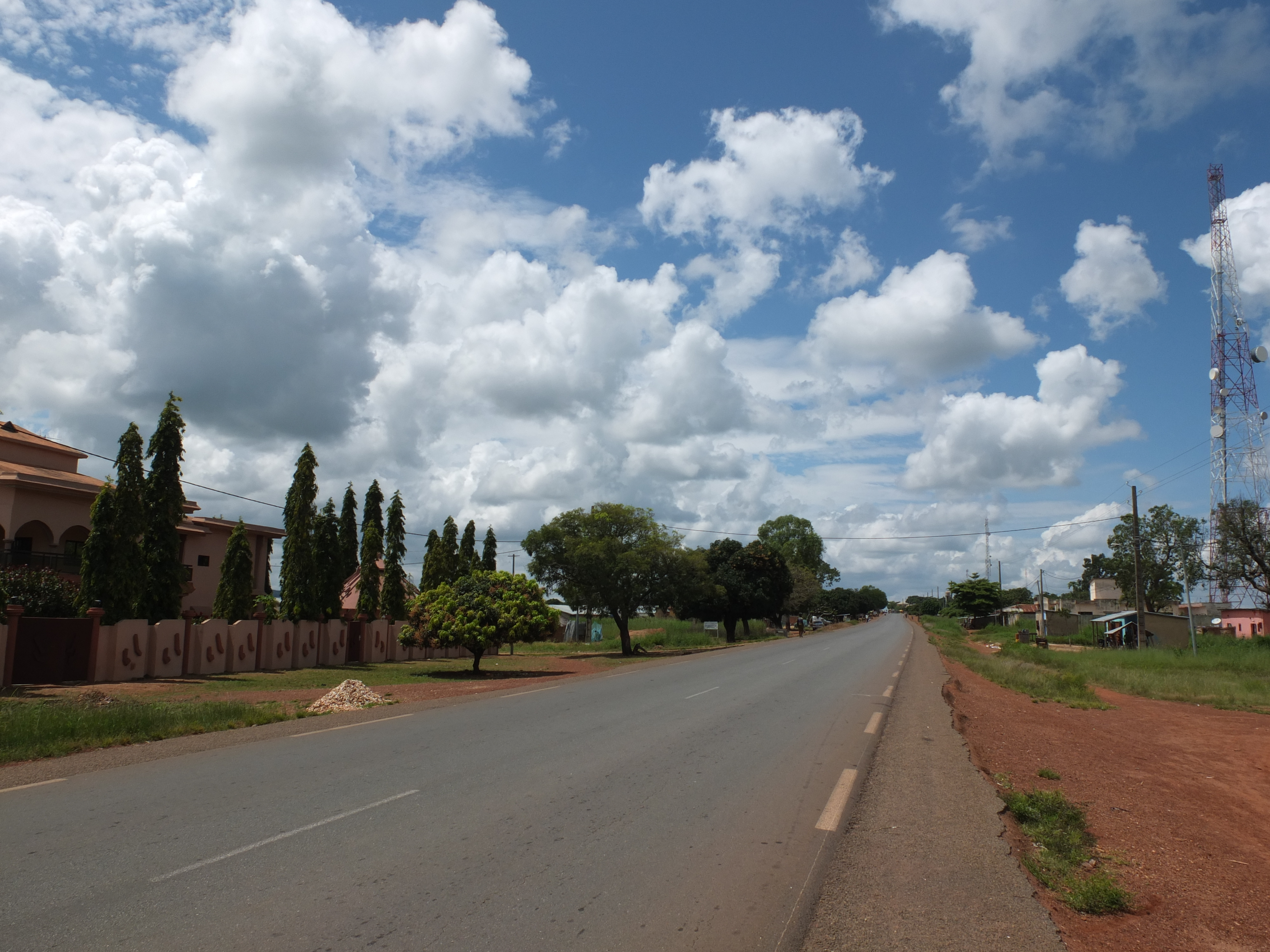
- Entrance to the town

- Location in Benin
- Coordinates: 9°50′15″N 1°32′53″E
- Country: Benin
- Department: Donga Department

Area
  - Total: 338 sq mi (876 km^{2})

Population (2013)
  - Total: 70,938
- Time zone: UTC+1 (WAT)

Copargo [kɔ.paʁ.go] is a town, arrondissement, and commune in the Donga Department of western Benin. The commune covers an area of 876 square kilometres and as of 2013 had a population of 70,938 people.

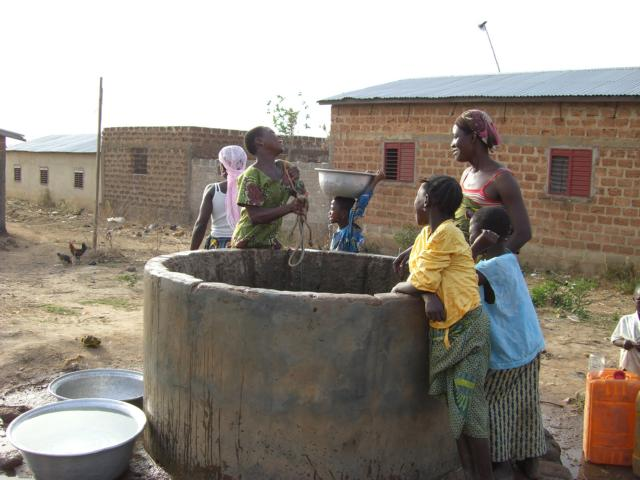
Locals
