= Dogue, Benin =

Dogue
- Village
- Location in Benin
- Coordinates: 9°6′N 1°56′E
- Country: Benin
- Department: Donga Department
- Commune: Bassila
- Arrondissement: Bassila
- Time zone: UTC+1 (WAT)

Dogue is a village in the commune of Bassila in the Donga Department of western Benin.
