= Fani, Mali =

Fani
- Commune and town
- Location in Mali
- Coordinates: 13°11′N 5°22′W
- Country: Mali
- Region: Ségou Region
- Cercle: Bla Cercle

Population (1998)
  - Total: 10,184
- Time zone: UTC+0 (GMT)

Fani is a small town and commune in the Cercle of Bla in the Ségou Region of southern-central Mali. In 1998 the commune had a population of 10,184.
