= Samabogo =

- Commune and town
- Location in Mali
- Coordinates: 13°1′N 6°23′W
- Country: Mali
- Region: Ségou Region
- Cercle: Bla Cercle

Population (1998)
  - Total: 9,808
- Time zone: UTC+0 (GMT)

Samabogo is a small town and commune in the Cercle of Bla in the Ségou Region of southern-central Mali. As of 1998 the commune had a population of 9,808.
