= Bla, Mali =

Bla ߓߟߊ
- Commune
- Location in Mali
- Coordinates: 12°57′N 5°45′W
- Country: Mali
- Region: Ségou Region
- Cercle: Bla Cercle
- Time zone: UTC+0 (GMT)

Bla (Bambara: ߓߟߊ tr. Bla) is a rural commune, town and capital of the Cercle of Bla in Mali's Ségou Region, located 85 kilometers south of Ségou along Mali's main highway. Bla serves as a central location for NGO activity in the region and is a crossroads for transportation going northeast to Mopti and Gao, as well as south to Sikasso, Burkina Faso, and Côte d'Ivoire. Bla is also the main town for the Djonka, a sub-group of the Bamana. The town's population as of 2004 was around 15,000 people.

Bla was established as an outpost by Biton Mamary Coulibaly during the expansion of the Ségou (or Bamana) Empire around the first half of the 18th century. The verb "ka bila" means to "leave behind" in Bamana, thus Bla's name relates to the town's original function, a supply outpost where the Bamana Empire's military left arms and grain for later use.

== See also ==
- List of cities in Mali
