= Malaria in Benin =

Malaria in Benin is the leading cause of mortality among children under five years of age and morbidity among adults. Malaria accounts for 40 percent of outpatient consultations and 25 percent of all hospital admissions. Malaria places an enormous economic strain on Benin's development, with The World Bank estimating that households in Benin spend approximately one quarter of their annual income on the prevention and treatment of malaria. Benin's long-term goal is to reduce the burden of malaria in order to improve national socio-economic development.

Large-scale implementation of artemisinin-based combination therapies (ACTs) and intermittent preventive treatment for pregnant women (IPTp) began in Benin in 2007 and has progressed rapidly. Rapid diagnostic tests, ACTs, and IPTp are being used in public health facilities nationwide and are being introduced into registered private clinics. More than 6 million long-lasting insecticide-treated nets have been distributed through mass and continuous distribution channels. Community health workers serve at the peripheral level of the national health system (Note: Benin's national health system has a pyramid structure with three levels: central, intermediate, and peripheral.) and are trained in malaria treatment and high-impact interventions. A recent national study found that 70 percent of all antimalarial sales take place in the private sector. Benin has shown significant improvements in several key malaria indicators, such as net ownership and usage and uptake of IPTp.

Malaria is endemic to Benin, and while transmission is stable, it is influenced by several factors, including vector species, geography, climate, and hydrography. The primary malaria vector in Benin is Anopheles gambiae s.s., but secondary vectors are also important to transmission. Entomological monitoring has confirmed insecticide resistance to carbamates among mosquito vector populations in parts of the country.
