= Kazangasso =

Coordinates: 13°05′27″N 5°32′56″W

- Commune and town
- Interactive map of Kazangasso
- Country: Mali
- Region: Ségou Region
- Cercle: Bla Cercle
- Elevation: 950 ft (290 m)

Population (1998)
  - Total: 5,481
- Time zone: UTC+0 (GMT)

Kazangasso is a small town and commune in the Cercle of Bla in the Ségou Region of southern-central Mali. As of 1998 the commune had a population of 5,481.
