= Somasso =

- Commune and town
- Location in Mali
- Coordinates: 12°52′N 5°36′W
- Country: Mali
- Region: Ségou Region
- Cercle: Bla Cercle

Population (1998)
  - Total: 69,561
- Time zone: UTC+0 (GMT)

Somasso is a town and commune in the Cercle of Bla in the Ségou Region of southern-central Mali. As of 1998 the commune had a population of 69,561.

Somasso is the capital of the district of the same name, in the cercle of Bla. Located 35 km from the town of Bla, capital of the cercle, the Municipality of Somasso is made up of five villages: Kadiala I and II, M'Petiona I, II and Somasso. It has 17 councils. It was created in 1999 according to the community code. It has an estimated population of 16,799 inhabitants including 8,206 men and 8,593 women according to the general census of October 2022.
