= Korodougou =

Coordinates: 13°02′17″N 5°26′46″W

- Commune
- Interactive map of Korodougou
- Country: Mali
- Region: Ségou Region
- Cercle: Bla Cercle

Population (1998)
  - Total: 9,618
- Time zone: UTC+0 (GMT)

Korodougou is a commune in the Cercle of Bla in the Ségou Region of Mali. The principal town lies at Nampasso. In 1998 the commune had a population of 9,618.
