= Dougouolo =

Coordinates: 12°56′N 5°34′W

- Commune and town
- Interactive map of Dougouolo
- Country: Mali
- Region: Ségou Region
- Cercle: Bla Cercle

Population (1998)
  - Total: 7,120
- Time zone: UTC+0 (GMT)

Dougouolo is a small town and commune in the Cercle of Bla in the Ségou Region of southern-central Mali. As of 1998 the commune had a population of 7,120.
