= Allada Normal School for Teachers =

Coordinates: 6°40′24″N 2°08′00″E

- L'École Normale d'Instituteurs d'Allada
- Type: Public
- Location: Allada, Benin
- Language: French

The Allada Normal School for Teachers (French: L'École Normale d'Instituteurs d'Allada, ENI) is a public training college for primary school teachers in Allada, Benin. It operates under the supervision of the Ministry of Primary and Secondary Education of Benin.

== See also ==
- Djougou Teachers' Training College
