= Yangasso =

- Commune and town
- Location in Mali
- Coordinates: 13°4′N 5°19′W
- Country: Mali
- Region: Ségou Region
- Cercle: Bla Cercle

Population (1998)
  - Total: 14,456
- Time zone: UTC+0 (GMT)

Yangasso is a small town and commune in the Cercle of Bla in the Ségou Region of southern-central Mali. As of 1998 the commune had a population of 14,456.

On 21 December 1915, a column of Senegalese Tirailleurs of the French Army was defeated here in a battle of the Volta-Bani War.
