= Baningime =

Baningime is a surname. Notable people with the surname include:

- Beni Baningime (born 1998), Congolese footballer
- Divin Baningime (born 2000), Congolese footballer
