= Kemeni, Mali =

Kemeni
- Commune and town
- Location in Mali
- Coordinates: 12°58′N 5°33′W
- Country: Mali
- Region: Ségou Region
- Cercle: Bla Cercle

Population (1998)
  - Total: 10,734
- Time zone: UTC+0 (GMT)

Kemeni is a small town and commune in the Cercle of Bla in the Ségou Region of southern-central Mali. In 1998 the commune had a population of 10,734.
