= N'Toba =

- Village
- Country: Mali
- Region: Ségou Region
- Cercle: Ségou Cercle
- Commune: Koulangougou
- Time zone: UTC+0 (GMT)

N'Toba is a village and seat of the commune of Koulangougou in the Cercle of Ségou in the Ségou Region of southern-central Mali.
