= Nyala, Nevada =

- Coordinates: 38°14′56″N 115°43′43″W
- Country: United States
- State: Nevada
- County: Nye
- Elevation: 4,813 ft (1,467 m)

Nyala is an extinct town in Nye County, in the U.S. state of Nevada.

== History ==
A post office called Nyala was in operation between 1914 and 1936. In 1941, the population was 68. The community's name is derived from Nye County.
