= HIV/AIDS in Benin =

The number of adults and children living with HIV/AIDS in Benin in 2003 was estimated by the Joint United Nations Programme for HIV/AIDS (UNAIDS) to range between 38,000 and 120,000, with nearly equal numbers of males and females. A recent study conducted by the National AIDS Control Program estimated the number of people living with HIV/AIDS to be 71,950. In 2003, an estimated 6,140 adults and children died of AIDS. Benin has a well-functioning system of antenatal HIV surveillance; in 2002, the median HIV prevalence at 36 antenatal clinics was 1.9%. Another study in 2002 showed an overall prevalence of 2.3% among adults in Cotonou, Benin's largest city.

Heterosexual intercourse and mother-to-child transmission (MTCT) are the primary modes of HIV transmission in Benin. HIV prevalence is relatively low compared with rates in most other countries in sub-Saharan Africa, but the virus is spreading steadily among young adults and vulnerable populations. In a 2002 study, an HIV prevalence of 44.7% was found among sex workers in four urban areas. In 2002, another study showed that HIV among sex workers in Cotonou, while still very high, had declined from nearly 60% in 1996 to 50% in 1999 and to 39% in 2002.

At the end of 2003, approximately 5,700 children aged 14 or younger were living with HIV/AIDS, mainly as a result of MTCT of HIV. At the end of 2003, nearly 34,000 children under age 17 had lost one or both parents to AIDS, and only 1,000 of these had received assistance such as food aid, health care, protection services, or psychosocial support.

Although knowledge of HIV and modes of transmission and prevention is widespread in Benin, prevention communication efforts have not led to a corresponding shift in behavior. The rising incidence of HIV is due primarily to poverty, migration, unsafe sexual practices, misperceptions regarding risk, and the low status of women, 80% of whom are illiterate.

== National response ==
Benin is a very poor country. More than a third of the population lives in poverty. Adult illiteracy, especially among women, and under-five child mortality are both high. Population growth is making it difficult for Benin to achieve sustainable social and economic development.

The president and other political leaders have publicly supported the fight against HIV/AIDS. National funding for HIV/AIDS activities, derived from the federal budget and debt-relief funds, totalled approximately $3.2 million in 2003.

With the plan for the period 2001–2005, Benin was nearing the end of its fourth intermediate national strategy to control HIV/AIDS. The plan called for promoting greater awareness of HIV/AIDS through a variety of public information, education, and communication efforts. Prevention, care, support, and treatment efforts are aimed at youth, women, migrants, sex workers, and persons living with HIV/AIDS. Benin receives multinational support for HIV/AIDS activities from the United States; the five-country, World Bank-led HIV/AIDS Abidjan-Lagos Transport Corridor project; the World Health Organization (WHO) 3x5 Initiative; and the Global Fund to Fight AIDS, Tuberculosis and Malaria (GFATM). Still, Benin faces a financial gap of approximately $32 million to fully implement its national strategic plan.

== See also ==
- AIDS pandemic
- HIV/AIDS in Africa
