= Bla Cercle =

Coordinates: 12°57′N 5°45′W

- Cercle
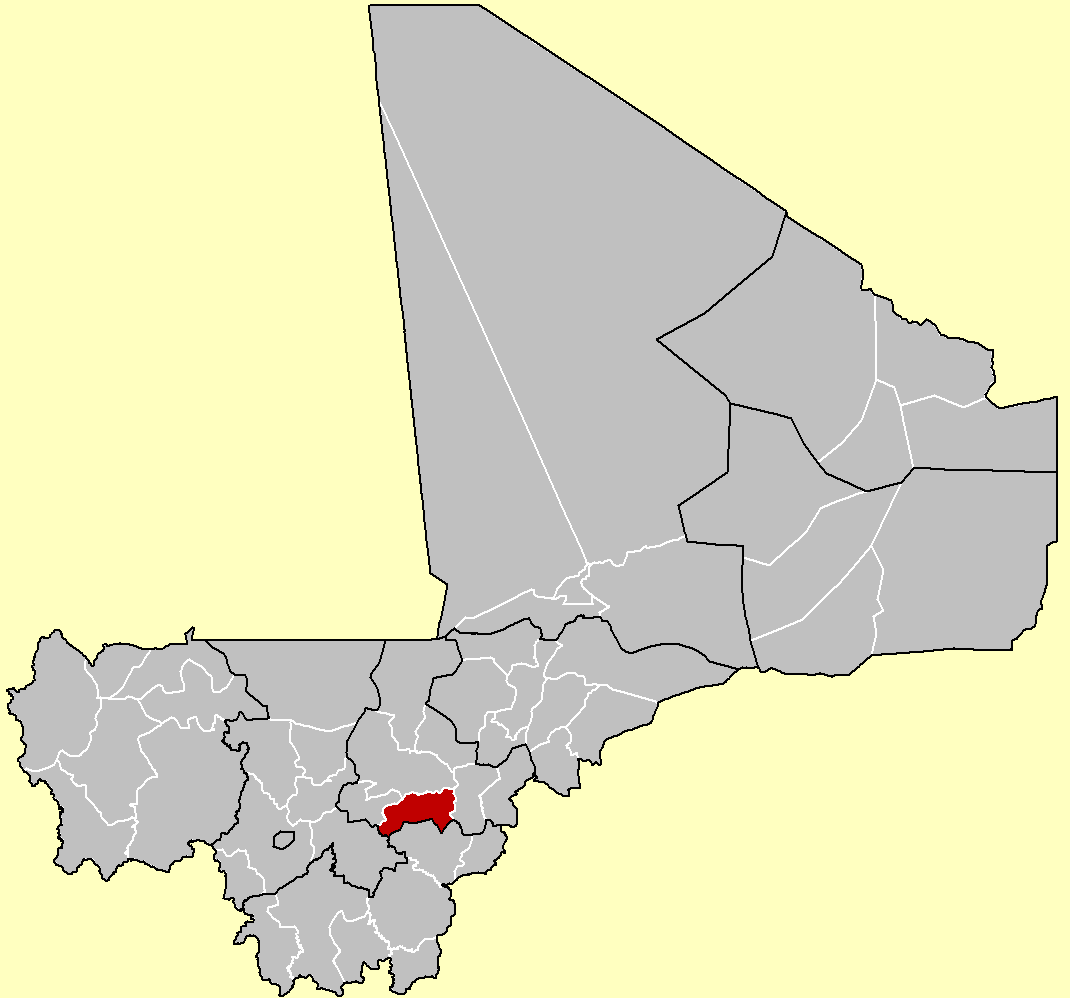
- Location of the Cercle of Bla in Mali
- Country: Mali
- Region: Ségou Region
- Admin HQ (chef-lieu): Bla

Area
  - Total: 6,200 km^{2} (2,400 sq mi)

Population (2009 census)
  - Total: 283,663
  - Density: 46/km^{2} (120/sq mi)
- Time zone: UTC+0 (GMT)

Bla Cercle is an administrative subdivision of the Ségou Region of Mali. The administrative center (chef-lieu) is the town of Bla.

The cercle is divided into 17 communes:

- Beguené
- Bla
- Diaramana
- Diena
- Dougouolo
- Falo
- Fani
- Kazangasso
- Kemeni
- Korodougou
- Koulandougou
- Niala
- Samabogo
- Somasso
- Tiemena
- Touna
- Yangasso
