= Nyala (disambiguation) =

The nyala and the mountain nyala are African antelopes. The term Nyala may also refer to:

- Kuni-Muktar Mountain Nyala Sanctuary, a protected area and wildlife sanctuary in Ethiopia
- the Nyala tree, Xanthocercis zambesiaca, an African tree
- Nyala Stadium, a multi-use stadium in Addis Abeba, Ethiopia
  - Nyala SC, an Ethiopian football club
- Nyala, Nevada, an unincorporated community in Nye County, Nevada, United States
- Nyala, Sudan
  - Nyala Airport
  - Nyala University
- RG-31 Nyala, an armoured vehicle
- Nyala, tribe, tribe of the Luhya people
- Nyala language (Luhya) (ISO 639-3: nle) – a Luhya language from Bantu group spoken in Kenya
- Nyala language (Sudan) (ISO 639-3: daj) – a Nilo-Saharan language spoken in Sudan
- Nyala (typeface), a font for Latin alphabet and Ge'ez script on Windows 7

== People with the name Nyala ==
- Nyala Pema Dündul (1816–1872), a teacher of Buddhism in Eastern Tibet
- Nyala Moon (born 1992), American filmmaker and actress

== See also ==
- Nayala Province, Burkina Faso
- Nyalas, a small town in Malaysia
