= Niala, Mali =

Niala
- Commune and town
- Location in Mali
- Coordinates: 13°55′N 4°22′W
- Country: Mali
- Region: Ségou Region
- Cercle: Bla Cercle

Population (1998)
  - Total: 7,667
- Time zone: UTC+0 (GMT)

Niala is a small town and commune in the Cercle of Bla in the Ségou Region of Mali. In 1998 the commune had a population of 7667.
