= Geography of Benin =

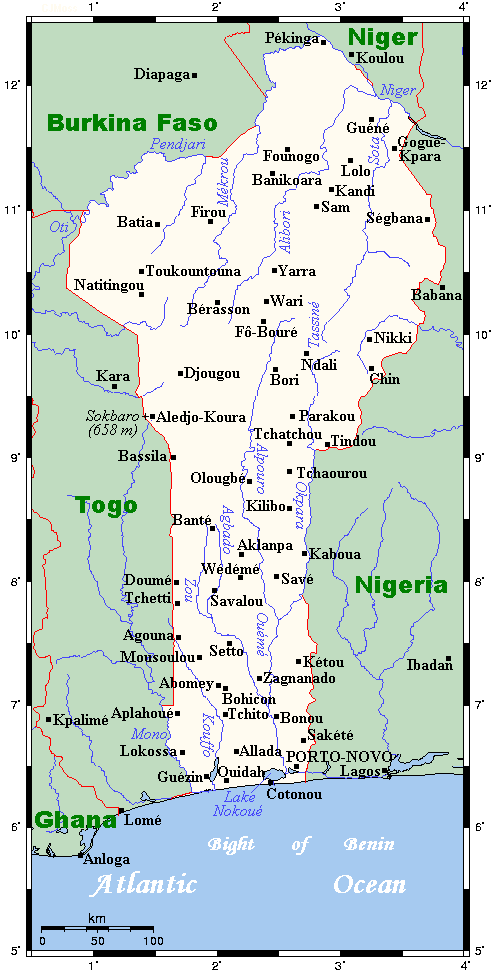
- Continent: Africa
- Region: West Africa; Sub-Saharan Africa
- Coordinates: 9°30′N 2°15′E
- Area: Ranked 102nd
  - Total: 112,622 km^{2} (43,484 sq mi)
  - Land: 98.2%
  - Water: 1.8%
- Coastline: 121 km (75 mi)
- Borders: Total land borders: 2,123 km (1,319 mi); Burkina Faso 386 km (240 mi), Niger 277 km (172 mi), Nigeria 809 km (503 mi), Togo 651 km (405 mi)
- Highest point: Mont Sokbaro 658 m (2,159 ft)
- Lowest point: Atlantic Ocean sea level
- Terrain: flat to undulating plain; some hills and mountains
- Natural resources: oil, limestone, marble, timber
- Environmental issues: deforestation, desertification

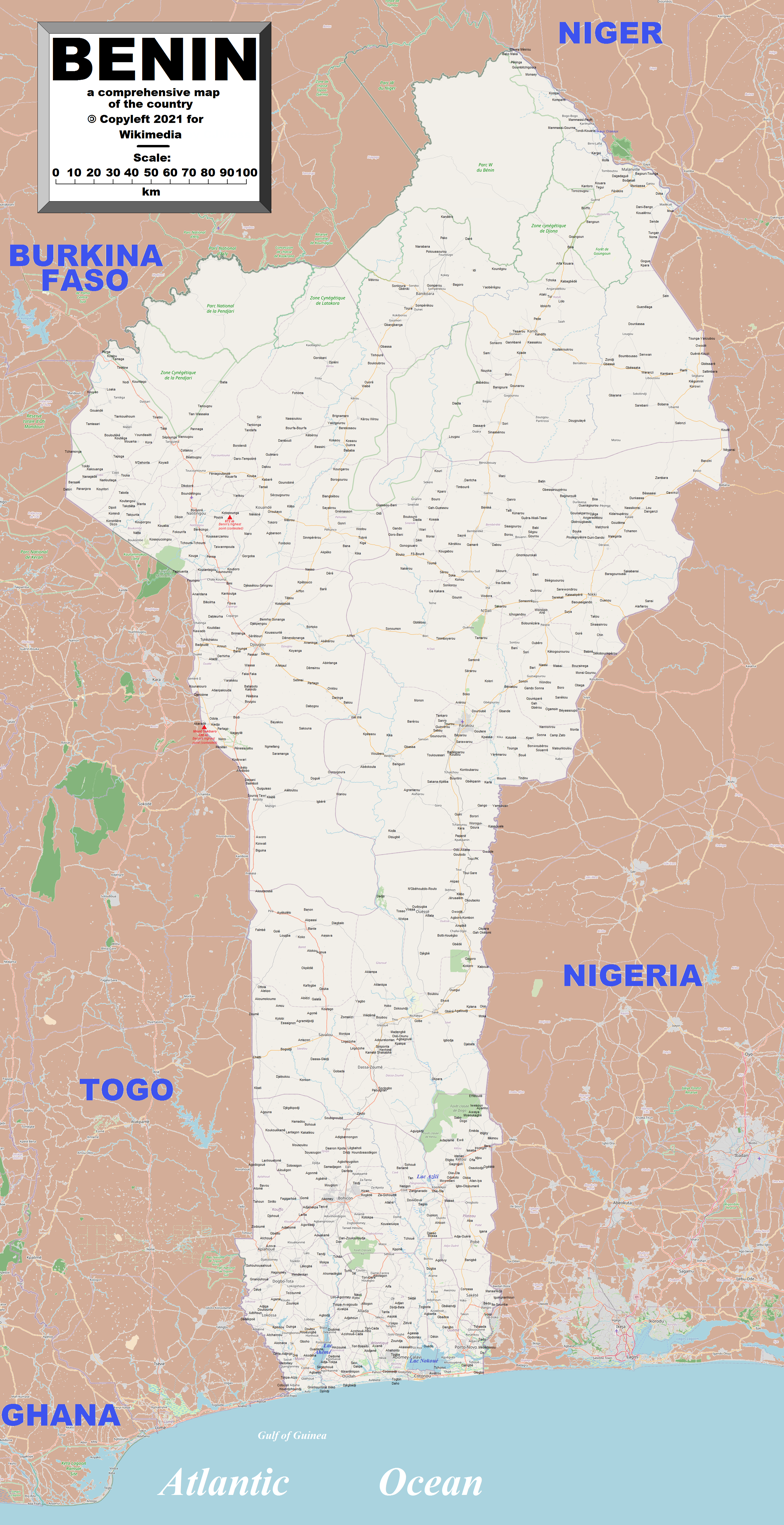
Enlargeable, detailed map of Benin

Benin, a narrow, key-shaped, north–south strip of land in West Africa, lies between the Equator and the Tropic of Cancer. Its latitude ranges from 6°30′ N to 12°30′ N and its longitude from 1° E to 3°40′ E. It is bounded by Togo to the west, Burkina Faso and Niger to the north, Nigeria to the east, and the Bight of Benin to the south.

With an area of 112,622 km^{2} (43,484 mi^{2}), it is slightly bigger than the nation of Bulgaria. It extends from the Niger River in the north to the Atlantic Ocean in the south, a distance of 700 km (435 mi). Although the coastline measures 121 km (75 mi), the country measures about 325 km (202 mi) at its widest point.

It is one of the smaller countries in West Africa, about one eighth the size of Nigeria, its neighbor to the east. It is, however, twice as large as Togo, its neighbor to the west. A relief map of Benin shows that it has little variation in elevation, averaging 200 m (656 ft) in elevation.

== Biogeography ==
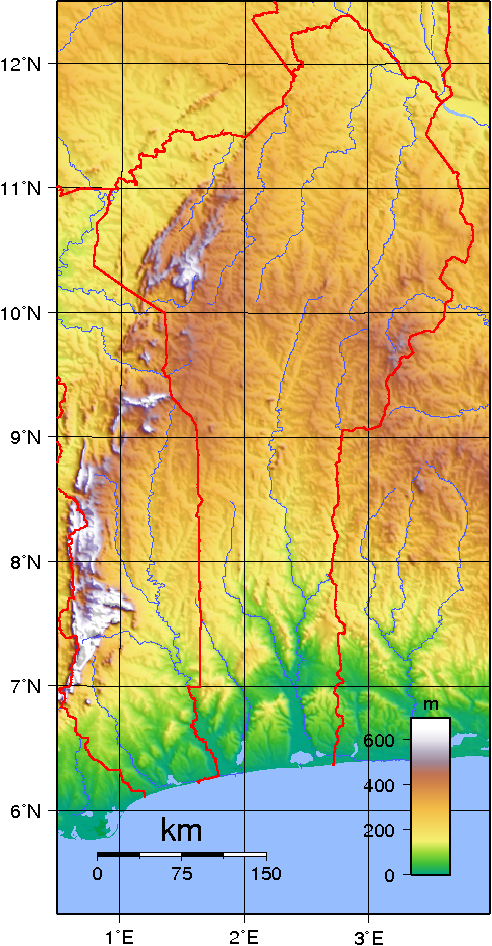
Topography of Benin

The country can be divided into four main areas from the south to the north. The low-lying, sandy, coastal plain, which has a highest elevation of 10 m (33 ft) is, at most, 10 km (6 mi) wide. It is marshy and dotted with lakes and lagoons connected to the ocean. The plateaus of southern Benin, with an altitude ranging between 20 and 200 m (66 and 656 ft), are split by valleys running north to south along the Couffo, Zou, and Oueme Rivers, an area that has been categorised by the World Wildlife Fund as part of the Guinean forest-savanna mosaic ecoregion. Then an area of flat lands dotted with rocky hills whose altitude seldom reaches 400 m (1,312 ft) extends around Nikki and Savé. Finally, the Atacora mountain range extends along the northwest border and into Togo with the highest point, Mont Sokbaro, at 658 m (2,159 ft).

Benin has fields lying fallow, mangroves, and remnants of large sacred forests. Forest cover is around 28.% of the total land area, equivalent to 3,135,150 hectares (12,104.9 mi^{2}) of forest in 2020, down from 4,835,150 hectares (18,668.6 mi^{2}) in 1990. In 2020, naturally regenerating forest covered 3,112,150 hectares (12,016.1 mi^{2}) and planted forest covered 23,000 hectares (89 mi^{2}).

In the rest of the country, the savanna is covered with thorny scrubs and dotted with huge baobab trees. Some forests line the banks of rivers. In the north and the northwest of Benin the Reserve du W du Niger and Pendjari National Park attract tourists eager to see elephants, lions, antelopes, hippos and monkeys. The country formerly offered habitat for the endangered painted hunting dog, Lycaon pictus, although this canid is considered to have been extirpated from Benin due to human population expansion. Woodlands comprise approximately 31 percent of Benin's land area.

Location: Western Africa, bordering the North Atlantic Ocean, between Nigeria and Togo

Geographic coordinates: 9°30′N 2°15′E

Continent: Africa

Area:
total: 112 622 km^{2}
country comparison to the world: 102
land: 110 622 km^{2}
water: 2 000 km^{2}

Area comparative

- Australia comparative: slightly less than 1/2 the size of Victoria
- Canada comparative: approximately 1 1/2 times the size of New Brunswick
- United Kingdom comparative: approximately 1/7 smaller than England
- United States comparative: slightly larger than Virginia
- EU comparative: slightly larger than Bulgaria

Land boundaries:
total: 2 123 km
border countries: Burkina Faso 386 km, Niger 277 km, Nigeria 809 km, Togo 651 km

Coastline: 121 km

Maritime claims:
territorial sea: 200 nautical miles (370.4 km)

Climate: tropical; hot, humid in south; semiarid in north

Terrain: mostly flat to undulating plain; some hills and low mountains

Elevation extremes:
lowest point: Atlantic Ocean 0 m
highest point: Mont Sokbaro 658 m

Natural resources: small offshore oil deposits, limestone, marble, timber

Land use:
arable land: 23.94%
permanent crops: 3.99%
other: 72.06% (2012)

Irrigated land: 230.4 km^{2} (2012)

'Total renewable water resources: 26.39 km^{3} (2011)

Freshwater withdrawal (domestic/industrial/agricultural):
total: 0.13 km^{3}/a (32%/23%/45%)
per capita: 18.74 m^{3}/a (2001)

Natural hazards: hot, dry, dusty harmattan wind may affect north in December to March

Environment – current issues: inadequate supplies of potable water; poaching threatens wildlife populations; deforestation; desertification

Environment – international agreements:
party to: Biodiversity, Climate Change, Climate Change-Kyoto Protocol Desertification, Endangered Species, Environmental Modification, Hazardous Wastes, Law of the Sea, Ozone Layer Protection, Ship Pollution, Wetlands, Whaling

Sandbanks create difficult access to a coast with no natural harbors, river mouths, or islands.

== Climate ==
Benin map of Köppen climate classification zones

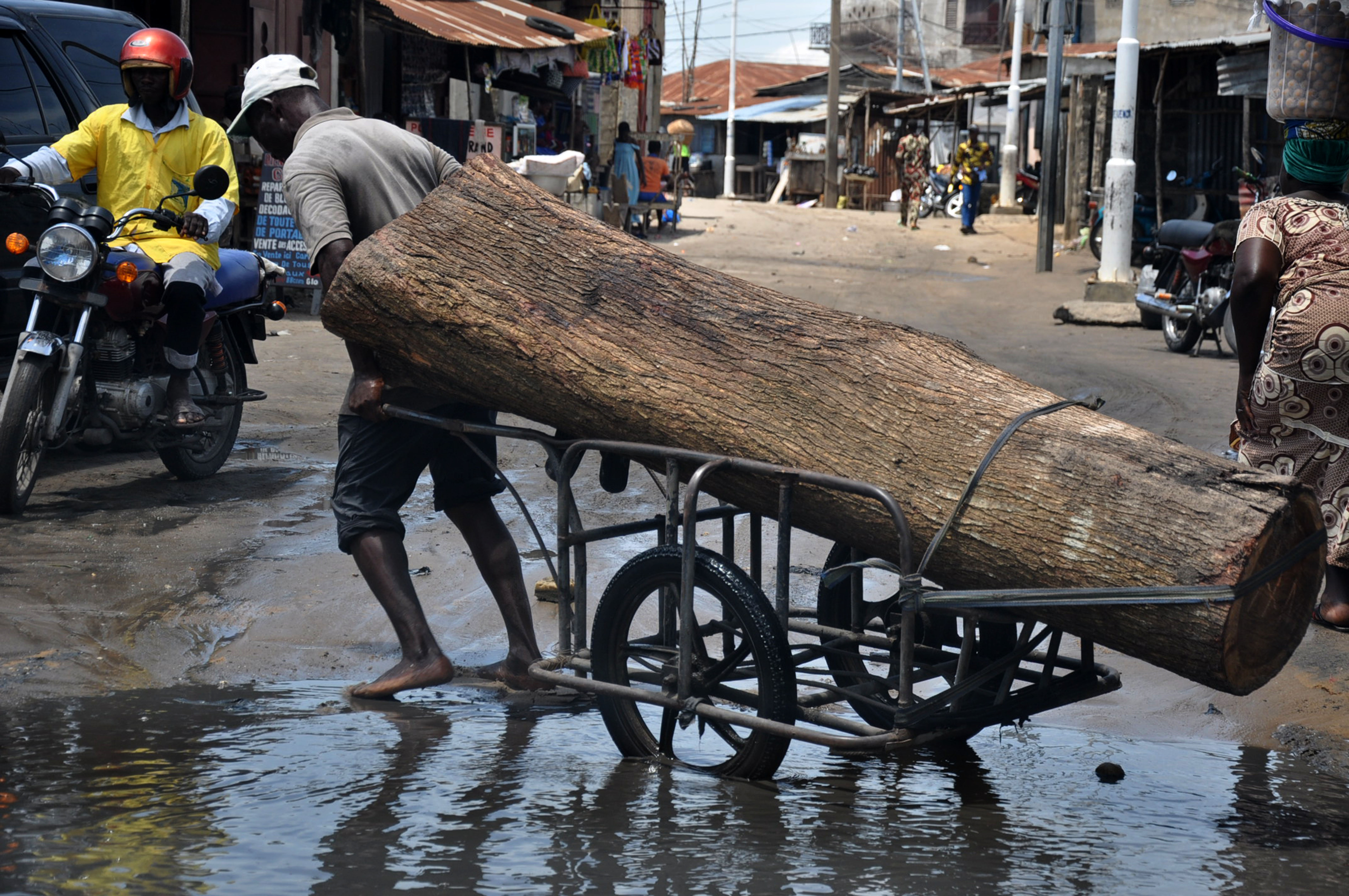
man transporting a tree trunk during rainy season (October 2018)

Benin's climate is hot and humid. Annual rainfall in the coastal area averages 1,360 mm (53.5 in), not particularly high for coastal West Africa. Benin has two rainy and two dry seasons. The principal rainy season is from April to late July, with a shorter less intense rainy period from late September to November. The main dry season is from December to April, with a short cooler dry season from late July to early September. Temperatures and humidity are high along the tropical coast. In Cotonou, the average maximum temperature is 31 °C (87.8 °F); the minimum is 24 °C (75.2 °F). Variations in temperature increase when moving north through a savanna and plateau toward the Sahel. A dry wind from the Sahara called the harmattan blows from December to March. Grass dries up, the vegetation turns reddish brown, and a veil of fine dust hangs over the country, causing the skies to be overcast. It is also the season when farmers burn brush in the fields.

Climate data for Porto-Novo
Month	Jan	Feb	Mar	Apr	May	Jun	Jul	Aug	Sep	Oct	Nov	Dec	Year
Daily mean °C (°F)	27 (81)	28 (82)	28 (82)	28 (82)	27 (81)	26 (79)	25 (77)	25 (77)	25 (77)	26 (79)	27 (81)	27 (81)	26 (79)
Average rainfall mm (inches)	23 (0.9)	34 (1.3)	86 (3.4)	127 (5.0)	215 (8.5)	370 (14.6)	129 (5.1)	44 (1.7)	89 (3.5)	140 (5.5)	52 (2.0)	16 (0.6)	1,325 (52.1)

Climate data for Cotonou (1961–1990, extremes 1910–present)
Month	Jan	Feb	Mar	Apr	May	Jun	Jul	Aug	Sep	Oct	Nov	Dec	Year
Record high °C (°F)	36.1 (97.0)	38.6 (101.5)	36.0 (96.8)	35.4 (95.7)	39.0 (102.2)	33.0 (91.4)	33.5 (92.3)	31.8 (89.2)	31.6 (88.9)	33.4 (92.1)	35.4 (95.7)	36.6 (97.9)	39.0 (102.2)
Mean daily maximum °C (°F)	30.8 (87.4)	31.6 (88.9)	31.9 (89.4)	31.6 (88.9)	31.0 (87.8)	29.2 (84.6)	28.0 (82.4)	27.8 (82.0)	28.4 (83.1)	29.6 (85.3)	30.9 (87.6)	30.8 (87.4)	30.1 (86.2)
Daily mean °C (°F)	27.3 (81.1)	28.5 (83.3)	28.9 (84.0)	28.6 (83.5)	27.8 (82.0)	26.5 (79.7)	25.8 (78.4)	25.6 (78.1)	26.0 (78.8)	26.7 (80.1)	27.6 (81.7)	27.3 (81.1)	27.2 (81.0)
Mean daily minimum °C (°F)	23.8 (74.8)	25.4 (77.7)	25.9 (78.6)	25.6 (78.1)	24.6 (76.3)	23.7 (74.7)	23.7 (74.7)	23.4 (74.1)	23.6 (74.5)	23.8 (74.8)	24.3 (75.7)	23.8 (74.8)	24.3 (75.7)
Record low °C (°F)	17.0 (62.6)	17.9 (64.2)	18.5 (65.3)	20.7 (69.3)	19.6 (67.3)	20.0 (68.0)	18.8 (65.8)	19.8 (67.6)	20.0 (68.0)	19.1 (66.4)	21.0 (69.8)	17.9 (64.2)	17.0 (62.6)
Average rainfall mm (inches)	9.2 (0.36)	36.8 (1.45)	73.8 (2.91)	137.0 (5.39)	196.9 (7.75)	356.0 (14.02)	147.0 (5.79)	64.9 (2.56)	99.0 (3.90)	126.7 (4.99)	41.4 (1.63)	19.6 (0.77)	1,308.3 (51.52)
Average rainy days (≥ 1.0 mm)	1	2	4	7	11	15	8	5	8	8	4	2	75
Average relative humidity (%)	82	82	80	82	83	87	86	86	86	86	85	83	84
Mean monthly sunshine hours	213.9	210.0	223.2	219.0	213.9	141.0	136.4	148.8	165.0	207.7	243.0	223.2	2,345.1
Mean daily sunshine hours	6.9	7.5	7.2	7.3	6.9	4.7	4.4	4.8	5.5	6.7	8.1	7.2	6.4
Source 1: NOAA
Source 2: Deutscher Wetterdienst (humidity, 1951–1967), Meteo Climat (record highs and lows)

Climate data for Parakou (1961–1990)
Month	Jan	Feb	Mar	Apr	May	Jun	Jul	Aug	Sep	Oct	Nov	Dec	Year
Record high °C (°F)	36.6 (97.9)	38.3 (100.9)	38.9 (102.0)	38.4 (101.1)	35.9 (96.6)	33.7 (92.7)	32.1 (89.8)	31.6 (88.9)	32.2 (90.0)	33.9 (93.0)	35.5 (95.9)	35.8 (96.4)	38.9 (102.0)
Mean daily maximum °C (°F)	34.1 (93.4)	36.0 (96.8)	36.2 (97.2)	34.9 (94.8)	32.8 (91.0)	30.7 (87.3)	29.2 (84.6)	28.6 (83.5)	29.5 (85.1)	31.5 (88.7)	33.6 (92.5)	33.6 (92.5)	32.6 (90.7)
Daily mean °C (°F)	26.5 (79.7)	28.7 (83.7)	29.6 (85.3)	29.0 (84.2)	27.5 (81.5)	26.1 (79.0)	25.1 (77.2)	24.7 (76.5)	25.0 (77.0)	26.1 (79.0)	26.6 (79.9)	26.1 (79.0)	26.8 (80.2)
Mean daily minimum °C (°F)	18.9 (66.0)	21.3 (70.3)	22.9 (73.2)	23.1 (73.6)	22.2 (72.0)	21.4 (70.5)	21.0 (69.8)	20.8 (69.4)	20.5 (68.9)	20.8 (69.4)	19.7 (67.5)	18.5 (65.3)	20.9 (69.6)
Record low °C (°F)	15.8 (60.4)	18.2 (64.8)	19.9 (67.8)	19.9 (67.8)	19.2 (66.6)	18.9 (66.0)	19.0 (66.2)	19.1 (66.4)	18.5 (65.3)	18.6 (65.5)	16.7 (62.1)	15.2 (59.4)	15.2 (59.4)
Average precipitation mm (inches)	3.8 (0.15)	9.2 (0.36)	39.4 (1.55)	85.5 (3.37)	130.8 (5.15)	172.0 (6.77)	189.9 (7.48)	208.8 (8.22)	205.6 (8.09)	91.1 (3.59)	6.3 (0.25)	6.6 (0.26)	1,149 (45.24)
Average precipitation days (≥ 1.0 mm)	0	1	3	5	9	11	12	13	15	7	1	1	78
Source: NOAA

Climate data for Kandi (1961–1990, extremes 1921–present)
Month	Jan	Feb	Mar	Apr	May	Jun	Jul	Aug	Sep	Oct	Nov	Dec	Year
Record high °C (°F)	41.2 (106.2)	43.0 (109.4)	43.3 (109.9)	43.9 (111.0)	43.3 (109.9)	40.9 (105.6)	38.9 (102.0)	39.9 (103.8)	39.8 (103.6)	41.5 (106.7)	39.5 (103.1)	39.5 (103.1)	43.9 (111.0)
Mean daily maximum °C (°F)	33.6 (92.5)	36.4 (97.5)	38.4 (101.1)	38.6 (101.5)	36.2 (97.2)	33.3 (91.9)	30.9 (87.6)	30.2 (86.4)	31.1 (88.0)	34.2 (93.6)	35.3 (95.5)	33.8 (92.8)	34.3 (93.7)
Daily mean °C (°F)	24.9 (76.8)	27.8 (82.0)	30.9 (87.6)	32.1 (89.8)	30.4 (86.7)	28.1 (82.6)	26.4 (79.5)	26.0 (78.8)	26.2 (79.2)	27.8 (82.0)	26.5 (79.7)	24.8 (76.6)	27.7 (81.9)
Mean daily minimum °C (°F)	16.1 (61.0)	19.2 (66.6)	23.4 (74.1)	25.6 (78.1)	24.6 (76.3)	22.9 (73.2)	21.9 (71.4)	21.8 (71.2)	21.4 (70.5)	21.4 (70.5)	17.7 (63.9)	15.8 (60.4)	21.0 (69.8)
Record low °C (°F)	10.0 (50.0)	12.6 (54.7)	15.2 (59.4)	17.0 (62.6)	16.5 (61.7)	14.9 (58.8)	18.6 (65.5)	19.0 (66.2)	15.0 (59.0)	14.0 (57.2)	10.8 (51.4)	5.0 (41.0)	5.0 (41.0)
Average precipitation mm (inches)	0.2 (0.01)	2.9 (0.11)	8.2 (0.32)	40.5 (1.59)	107.0 (4.21)	152.7 (6.01)	196.9 (7.75)	271.9 (10.70)	190.9 (7.52)	34.1 (1.34)	0.5 (0.02)	0.6 (0.02)	1,006.6 (39.63)
Average precipitation days (≥ 1.0 mm)	0	0	1	3	8	10	13	16	13	3	0	0	67
Average relative humidity (%)	33	28	36	52	65	75	82	85	85	76	54	40	59
Mean monthly sunshine hours	279.0	257.6	260.4	255.0	272.8	252.0	223.2	195.3	213.0	275.9	282.0	279.0	3,045.2
Source 1: NOAA
Source 2: Deutscher Wetterdienst (humidity, 1951–1967), Meteo Climat (record highs and lows)

== Tree cover extent and loss ==
Global Forest Watch publishes annual estimates of tree cover loss and 2000 tree cover extent derived from time-series analysis of Landsat satellite imagery in the Global Forest Change dataset. In this framework, tree cover refers to vegetation taller than 5 m (including natural forests and tree plantations), and tree cover loss is defined as the complete removal of tree cover canopy for a given year, regardless of cause.

For Benin, country statistics report cumulative tree cover loss of 47,919 ha (479.19 km^{2}) from 2001 to 2024 (about 28.5% of its 2000 tree cover area). For tree cover density greater than 30%, country statistics report a 2000 tree cover extent of 168,201 ha (1,682.01 km^{2}). The charts and table below display this data. In simple terms, the annual loss number is the area where tree cover disappeared in that year, and the extent number shows what remains of the 2000 tree cover baseline after subtracting cumulative loss. Forest regrowth is not included in the dataset.

Annual tree cover loss in Benin, 2001–2024. View chart definition.
Tree cover extent in 2000 minus cumulative tree cover loss in Benin, 2001–2024 (loss-only residual; does not account for gain). View chart definition.

Annual tree cover extent and loss
Year	Tree cover extent (km2) (Note: This residual measure does not include forest regrowth.)	Annual tree cover loss (km2)
2001	1,644.53	37.48
2002	1,609.74	34.79
2003	1,575.00	34.74
2004	1,568.17	6.83
2005	1,552.34	15.83
2006	1,534.40	17.94
2007	1,487.95	46.45
2008	1,483.14	4.81
2009	1,433.94	49.20
2010	1,428.65	5.29
2011	1,422.10	6.55
2012	1,393.52	28.58
2013	1,380.41	13.11
2014	1,366.85	13.56
2015	1,360.86	5.99
2016	1,340.75	20.11
2017	1,318.40	22.35
2018	1,300.19	18.21
2019	1,292.47	7.72
2020	1,276.44	16.03
2021	1,259.44	17.00
2022	1,242.74	16.70
2023	1,216.72	26.02
2024	1,202.82	13.90

== Extreme points ==
This is a list of the extreme points of Benin, the points that are farther north, south, east or west than any other location.

- Northernmost point – the confluence of the Mékrou River and the river Niger on the border with Niger, Alibori Department
- Easternmost point – unnamed location on the border with Nigeria immediately east of the town of Néganzi, Borgou Department
- Southernmost point – the point at which the border with Togo enters the Atlantic Ocean, Mono Department
- Westernmost point – unnamed location on the border with Togo immediately south-west of Tiokossi in Datori, Atakora Department
