= Aworo =

- Village
- Location in Benin
- Coordinates: 8°50′N 1°39′E
- Country: Benin
- Department: Donga Department
- Commune: Bassila
- Time zone: UTC+1 (WAT)

Aworo is a village in the commune of Bassila in the Donga Department of western Benin. It is located near the border with Togo. Le village du feu MAHAMADOU COULIBALY. CRÉE PAR DEGUENON en 1910. Les habitants sont des Nagots, réjouint après par les Lokpa. Le chef du village actuel s appelle. SABI ADAM SAIDOU. LE CHEF COUTUMIER est ABOUDOU SONGA.
