= Mont Sokbaro =

Mountain and highest point of Benin

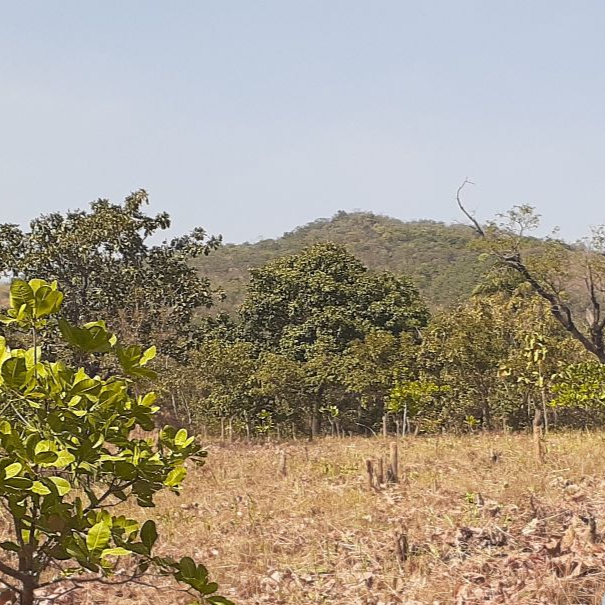
- Mont Sokbaro in 2021

Highest point
- Elevation: 658 m (2,159 ft)
- Coordinates: 9°19′41″N 1°24′56″E

Geography
- Location within Benin
- Location: Benin - Togo border

Geology
- Mountain type: Mountain

Mont Sokbaro (also spelled as Sagbarao) is a mountain that is mostly cited as the highest point of Benin, with an elevation of 658 metres (2,159 ft). This designation is contested, as SRTM readings at coordinates 10°17′22″N 1°32′38″E give an elevation of 672 metres (2,205 ft). This is a location 2.5 kilometres (1.6 mi) southeast of Kotoponga.

Mont Sokbaro is located on the border of the Donga Department in Benin and the Kara Region in the country of Togo, close to the source of the Mono River. It is located 58 kilometres (36 mi) from the town of Bassila. The hill is part of the quartzite massif of the Atakora Mountains that continues westward into the latter country, where they are called the Togo Mountains. Some of these have higher elevations. On the Eastern side of Benin lies the lower land with an average elevation of 550 metres (1,800 ft). Close by lie the villages of Tchèmbèré, Aledjo-Koura and Akaradè. Hiking activities occur to the top of the hill, but the area is in need of more tourist development.

== See also ==
- Geography of Benin
- Geography of Togo
