= RNIE 3 =

National highway of Benin

Location
- Country: Benin

Highway system
- Transport in Benin

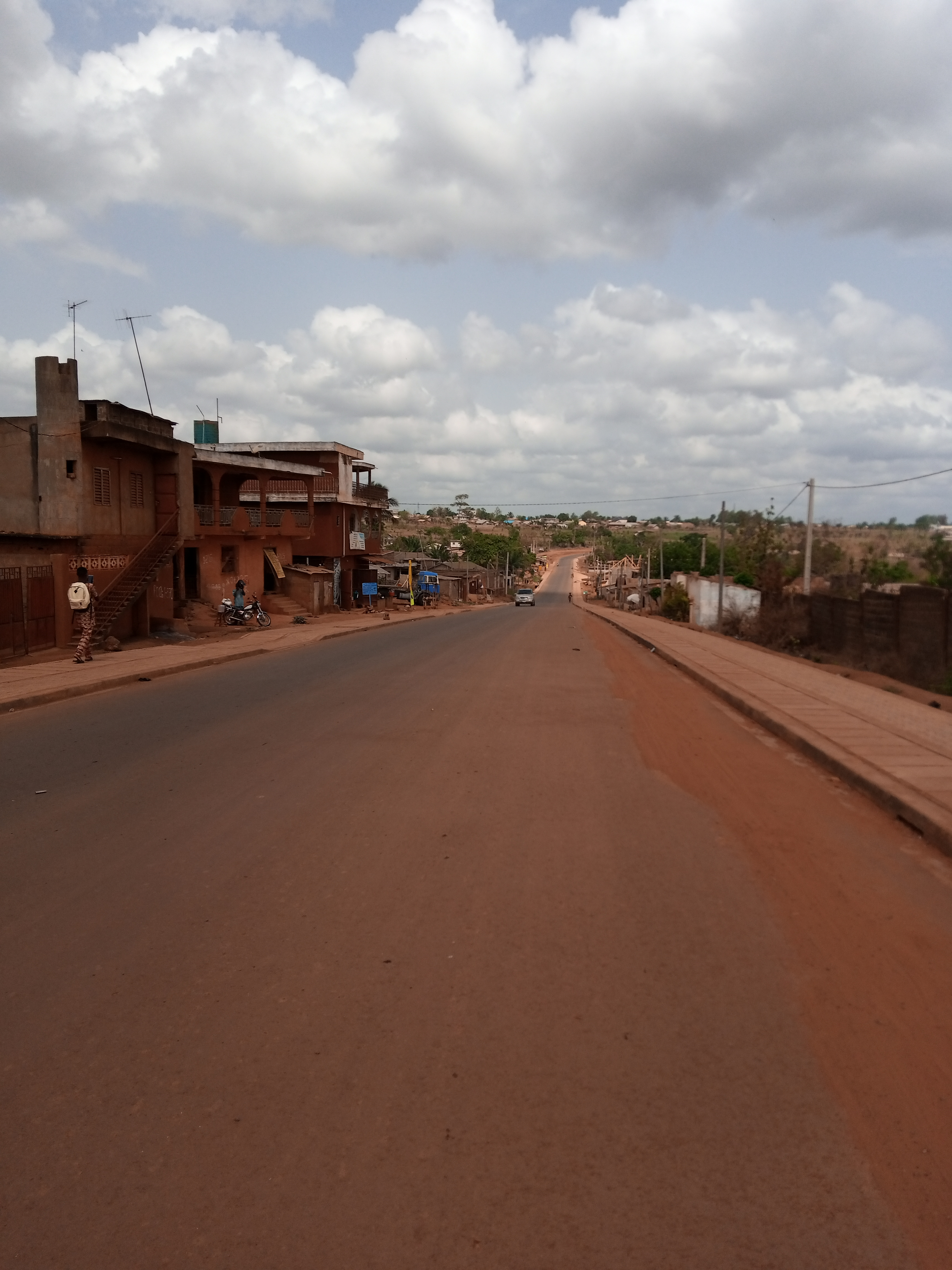
The RNIE3 between Pobe and Ognibolo

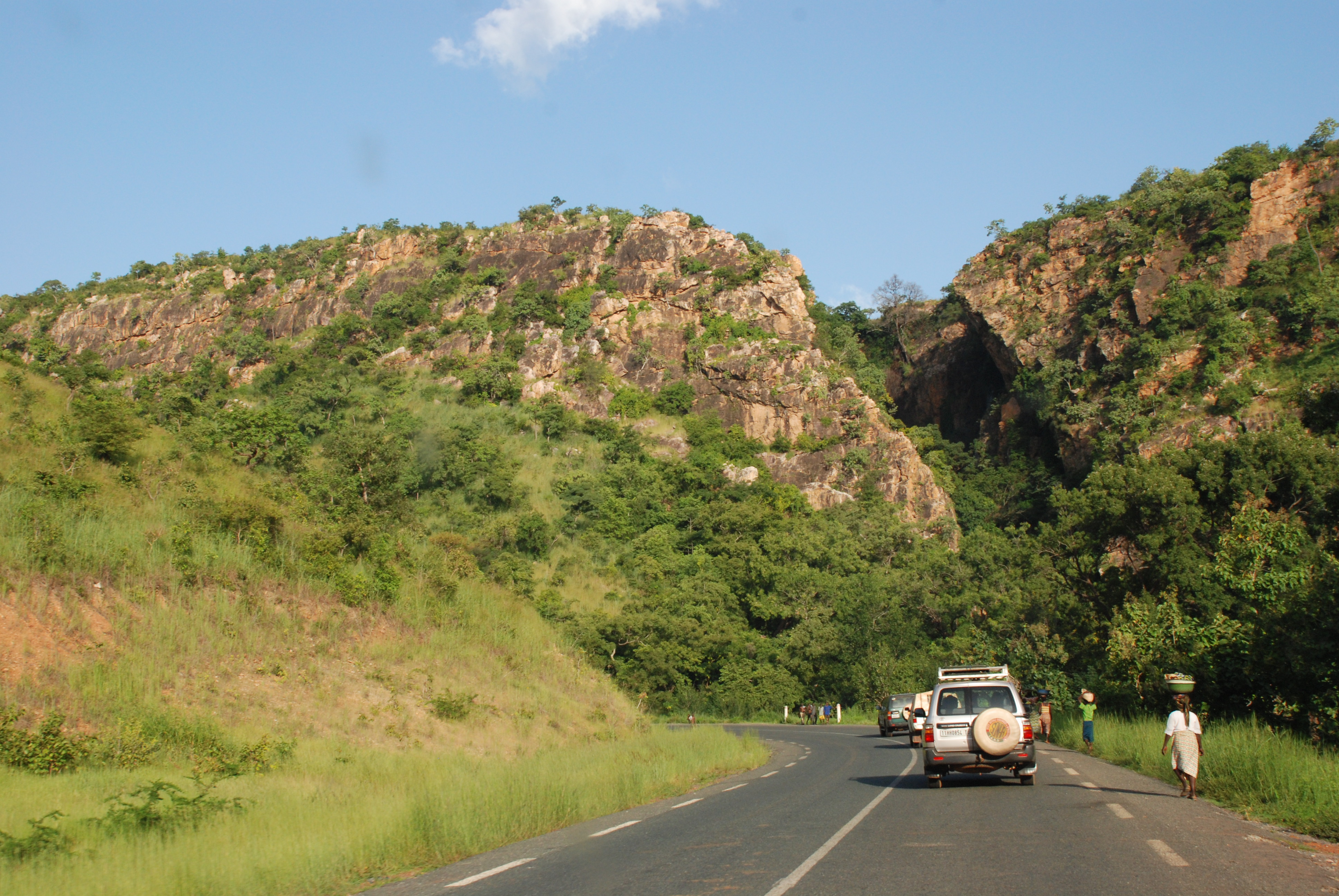
The RNIE 3 south of Tanguiéta, and 50 km north of Natitingou in northwest Benin

RNIE 3 is a national highway of Benin. It passes from north to south in the west of the country running near the border with Togo.

== Cities and towns ==
- Tanguiéta
- Natitingou
- Bassila
- Bantè
