= Bassila =

- Commune
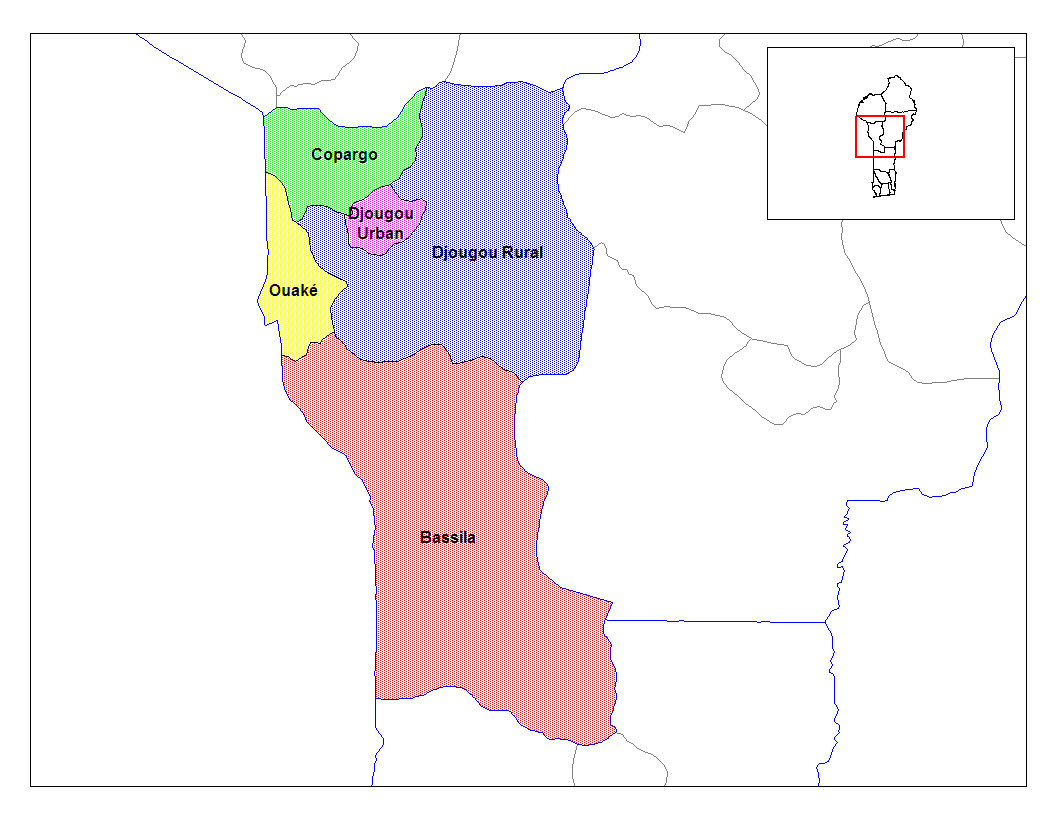
- Commune location in the Donga Department

- Location in Benin
- Coordinates: 9°01′N 1°40′E
- Country: Benin
- Department: Donga Department

Area
  - Total: 5,661 km^{2} (2,186 sq mi)

Population (2013)
  - Total: 130,770
  - Density: 23.10/km^{2} (59.83/sq mi)
- Time zone: UTC+0 (GMT 0)

Bassila [ba.si.la] is a town, arrondissement, and commune located in the Donga Department of Benin. The commune covers an area of 5,661 square kilometres and as of 2013 had a population of 130,770 people.

The RNIE 3 highway of Benin passes through the town of Bassila and the commune. The main ethnic groups in the commune are in the order of significance: Yoruba/Nagot who are the native dwellers, as well as smaller migrant communities of Anii and Tem people otherwise known as 'Kotokoli'. The Nagots historically migrated from Nigeria during a westward Yoruba expansion. The town of Bassila is largely Anii, and is the largest Anii-speaking village. Given that Bassila is located in proximity to the border with Togo, a significant proportion of the population are of Togolese origin (Anii and Kotokoli migrants). Bassila is the second largest arrondissement in Benin by land area.

Mont Sokbaro, widely cited as the highest point of Benin, lies in Bassila commune, on the border with Togo.

== Towns and villages ==
Adeli, Afodiobo, Agougou, Akarade, Aledjo-Koura, Aletoutou, Alori, Assion, Aworo, Bakana-Kari, Bakperou, Baningli, Bassila, Bayakou, Biguina, Bodi, Bomako, Boutou, Diengou, Dogue, Gando, Gaougado, Gassagadi, Gatakpal, Goutoungadoni, Guiguizo, Igbere, Igbomakoro, Inkolonie, Iyo, Kadjimani, Kaoute, Katia, Kemeni, Kemetou Alidjo, Kemetou Penezoulou, Kikele, Koakoaliki, Kokotyi, Kominde, Kouloumizi, Kpartao, Kpendi, Lagbere, Liro, Madiatom, Manigri, Mborko, Ngioro, Ngmellang, Niala, Odokoriko, Odola, Ogougouworo, Okouta-Boussa, Penelan, Pénéssoulou, Prekete, Sakouna, Sakouna-Neugbawaperoun, Saramanga, Tchembere, Tiakpartia, Tiatiala, Touroumini, Wetietie, Yadia, Yari

== Notable people ==
- Alphonse Alley
