= Ouaké =

- Commune and city
- Location in Benin
- Coordinates: 9°39′42″N 1°23′5″E
- Country: Benin
- Department: Donga Department

Area
  - Total: 256 sq mi (663 km^{2})

Population (2013)
  - Total: 74,289
- Time zone: UTC+1 (WAT)

Ouaké [wa.ke] is a town, arrondissement, and commune in the Donga Department of western Benin. The commune covers an area of 663 square kilometres and as of 2013 had a population of 74,289 people.

== Ethnic groups ==
The Lokpa (or Lukpa) are the predominant ethnic group in Ouake. Ouake is the primary population center for the Lokpa people in Benin.
