= Aledjo-Koura =

- Village
- Location in Benin
- Coordinates: 9°21′N 1°27′E
- Country: Benin
- Department: Donga Department
- Commune: Bassila
- Time zone: UTC+1 (WAT)

Aledjo-Koura is a village and arrondissement in the commune of Bassila in the Donga Department of western Benin. It is located near the border with Togo, close to Mont Sokbaro, which is widely cited as the highest point of Benin.
