= Djougou =

- Commune and city
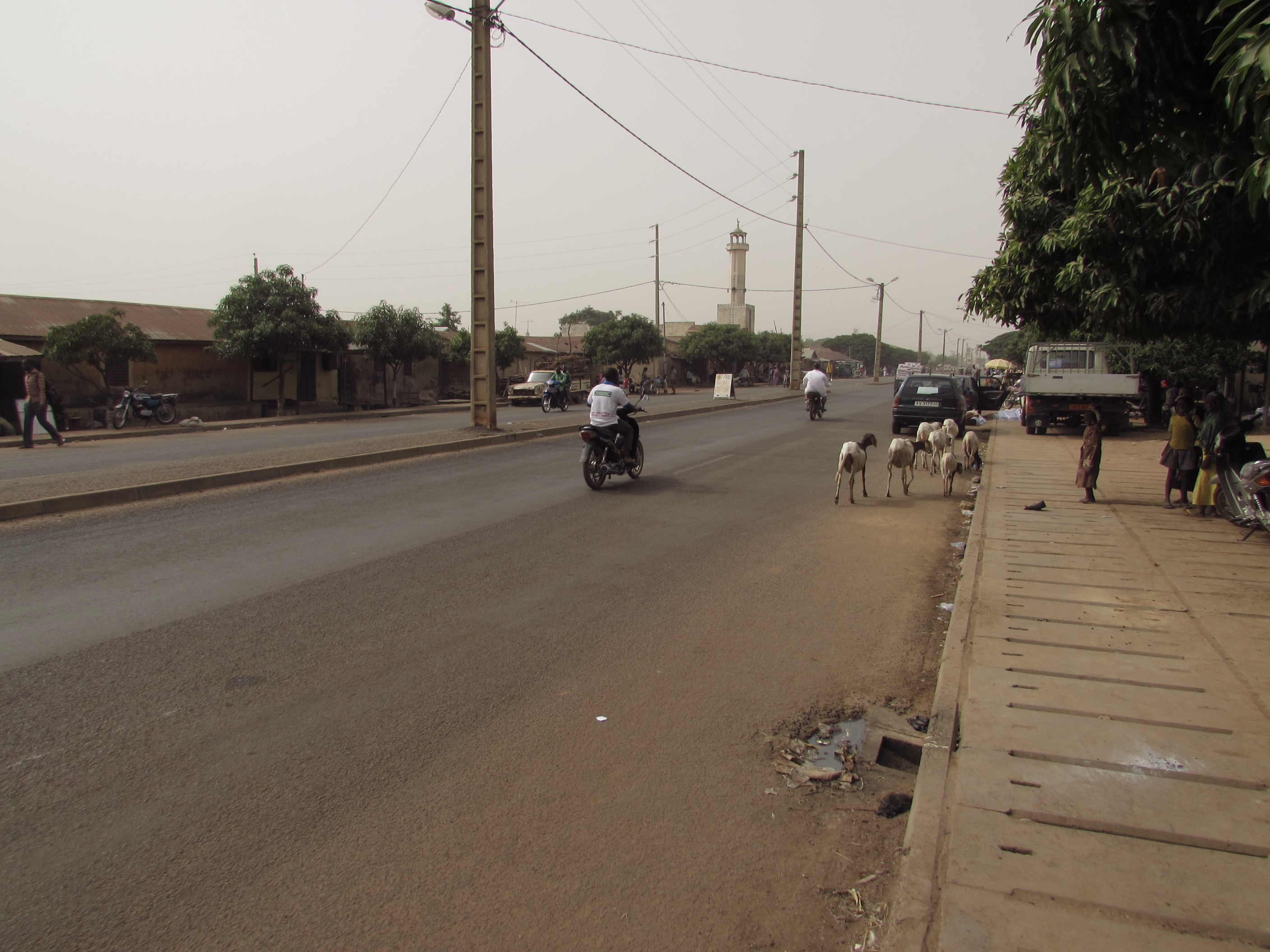

- Location in Benin
- Coordinates: 9°42′N 1°40′E
- Country: Benin
- Department: Donga Department

Area
  - Total: 3,966 km^{2} (1,531 sq mi)
- Elevation: 431 m (1,414 ft)

Population (2009)
  - Total: 237,040
- Time zone: UTC+1 (WAT)

Djougou [dʒu.gu] is the largest city in northwestern Benin. It is an important market town. The commune covers an area of 3,966 square kilometres and as of 2002 had a population of 237.040 people.

Djougou is home to a constituent monarchy.

== General information ==
The city of Djougou is the capital city of the department of the Donga, and is considered to be the commercial capital of the Atacora-Donga region, with Natitingou acting as the seat of government and the primary tourist city. Djougou has a population of over 237,000 according to 2009 recensement . While Yom is the primary language and ethnic group in Djougou, there are also a number of Fulani (Peul in French), Dendi, Lokpa, as well as transplanted Fon from the South. Like most of Benin, Djougou has a young and growing population. Large families and multiple wives are common—leading to a large number of young and school-aged children and pregnant women. There are many different neighborhoods throughout the city, but they are fairly amorphous. People are quicker to identify where they live not by the name of their neighborhood, but by which main road it lies on or by a nearby landmark or mosque.

The population of Djougou is predominantly Muslim, with each neighborhood boasting at least one mosque. Muslims in Djougou range from the very conservative to the fairly liberal. It is relatively common to see women completely veiled in black, including their faces. More often, however, Muslim women wear a headscarf and a few wear no veil of any kind. This wardrobe decision is made by following family tradition until marriage, after which she follows the traditions of her husband's family. Conservative Muslim men refrain from alcohol, but most are not opposed to drinking. Nearly all Muslims abstain from eating pork and observe the calls to prayer. There is a considerable Catholic presence in Djougou as well with a large cathedral, a convent, seminary, and Catholic school system that runs through secondary school. Religion is important to the people of Djougou and it is common to be asked your religious affiliation when meeting someone new. This is done out of curiosity, not prejudice, and there appears to be a considerable amount of religious tolerance here. Christian and Muslim holidays are both celebrated.

== Transportation and communication ==
Djougou is a major hub of transportation and communication. It acts as a crossroads of trade and travel, and is easily accessible during the entire year. There are four major roads that intersect to form the city's center—the roads to Cotonou, Parakou, Natitingou, and the Ouake/Togolese border. As a relatively wealthy city, there are members of the community who own private cars. Many families in the community have at least one moto that they use as their primary means of transportation. In addition, Zémidjan are easy to find throughout the city. Cell phone communication is very consistent in Djougou, and all major carriers have service in the area pretty much all of the time. Internet communication is also available in the cyber cafes and in some office buildings, although the connection is not always reliable.

== Safety and security ==
The primary safety concern cited by community members is petty theft and community members take precautions by keeping valuables under lock and key. Instances of theft are rarely solved by the police, but are instead resolved by community pressure or occasionally physical, public retribution. There are two major gendarmerie (police) offices in Djougou in addition to a military camp near Taifa. These security forces make the city safe not to add the plenty public lights and the influx of solar-based system for public lighting.

== Water and sanitation ==
People in Djougou obtain their water from several sources. Many homes and places of work have running tap water. Other concessions have a communal well from which people draw their water. There is a lake bordering Djougou on the southern side, but community members do not fetch water directly from it and access has been recently restricted after the drowning of child playing near the dam in 2009. While people here do not boil their drinking water, they agree that tap water is healthier than well water. The water supply is consistent, and few experience problems with access of some kind.

Concessions all have private latrines and some homes with running water also have toilets. Latrines are covered and almost always set an adequate distance from the school, restaurant, etc. for sanitation reasons. Most animals are well-maintained. Even if they are not confined, they are usually guarded by someone and kept within a certain area or distance. There is both natural and plastic trash in Djougou—both of which people usually dump by the side of the road or into large areas of tall grass. This trash is then burned with the grass during the Harmattan season. The city as a whole is fairly clean. The air quality is better than expected for the size of the city, and most public areas such as schools and restaurants are kept clean, especially in comparison to larger southern cities like Porto-Novo. A trial program began in November 2010 for trash collection.

== Food and supplies ==
The grand marché in Djougou is held every 4 days, but the market area is open every day. Djougou hosts the largest market in the area. On a daily basis in the market one can find grains, salt, bread, sugar, fish, wagasi, eggs, tomatoes, onions, peppers, meat, lettuce, soy cheese, dried pasta, tomato paste, garlic, oil, cabbage, oranges, citrons, bananas, plantains, and, seasonally, pineapples and avocados. Wagasi which local made cheese out of fresh cow milk is the region delicacy and one should always try to eat it before leaving. In addition to the open market, there are also several boutiques where one can find more expensive items like jelly, butter, spices, cookies, coffee, powdered milk, Lipton tea, wine, and liquor. These boutiques also sell toiletry items such as toilet paper, facial tissues, soap, razors, and toothpaste. There is a supermarché that recently opened where all of these items can be found in addition to tissue, cooking utensils, PEB mattress items, purses, fake flowers, perfume, and brassieres! People generally eat three meals a day—two of rice and beans (watchi) with wagasi or pate/akassa, and one of yam pilée. The first meal is eaten around 8 or 8:30 in the morning, the second around noon or 1 pm, and the third as the sun sets around 8 or later, 9 pm. When certain fruits, such as pineapples or avocados, are only available during certain seasons, there is no discernible 'hungry season' in Djougou where food is not as available. People report that, 'for the very poor, it is always the hungry season, for those with enough money, one can always find food.'

== Income, business, and money ==
All manner of work is done in Djougou. People spend their money on food, supplies, household items, and gasoline for their cars and motos. People say they try to save money for travel, families with children save money for school fees, and everyone complains that the most expensive thing they constantly need to buy is phone credit. There are many groupements and associations centered around different trades in Djougou, including tissage and shea butter. There are several tailors, carpenters, boutique owners, etc. throughout Djougou, but community members usually just go to the one in closest proximity to their homes. There is no concept of business competition and 'shopping around' to get the best price, even though people will bargain extensively with their local tailor or carpenter. It is seen as disrespectful to one's neighborhood to solicit the services of someone further away, even if the quality or price may be better.

There are many artisans in Djougou. One local artisan makes jewelry boxes and other small items out of animal skins. There is a groupement of artisans that make high class tissage/ They have a new production center, donated by a Swiss NGO, and are in the process of figuring out how to market their high end product to a community that cannot always afford it. They are currently attempting to get space at the artisans market in Cotonou. Most artisans say that they would like to find some way to market their products in America.

Because Djougou is a major crossroads for the Atacora-Donga region, many people also work in transportation and travel, as truck drivers, chauffeurs, mechanics, or for one of the major bus lines. There are also two hotels. In cooperation with the mayor's office, those who work in transportation and hospitality are also interested in developing the tourist industry in Djougou—modeling it after the more successful tourist businesses in Natitingou and Tanguieta.

== Schools ==
There are three CEGs in Djougou, two that have classes for all grade levels—6ieme through terminale, and one that has classes just through the first cycle—6ieme through 3ieme. There is also a Catholic primary and secondary school. In the CEGs, teachers report class sizes of 40 and 50. Students must pay for their uniforms and books in order to attend. In the first cycle classes, there is generally a balance of male and female students, but in the upper classes, 3ieme through terminale, there begins to be more male students than female. Several reasons are cited for children stopping school; including being needed to work at home, the need to send another child to school instead, and for girls, teenage pregnancy. For extracurricular activities, the CEGs have girls' clubs and Amour et Vie clubs to promote health, but they are voluntary and not directly related to school activities. Boys also stay after school to play football.

== Recreation ==
Young children mainly play in their concessions and in their neighborhoods. There is a major sports stadium in Djougou where football games, cultural events, and concerts are held. There are also several football fields throughout the city where boys gather on the weekends to play pick-up games. Children also play football at the CEGs. There is a Maison de Jeunes in the center of town, with a big screen TV that shows football games throughout the day. Small children who do not have the 150 francs stand outside and watch and cheer through the windows. This venue also hosts other events and presentations and there is a well ventilated and attended cyber caféwith relatively reliable internet connection for 400 francs. Most recreational activities are geared toward men and boys, with women expected to be helping out with household chores during their free time. Women spend a lot of their free time multi-tasking, making yam pile or selling a good at the marché while gossiping simultaneously or listening to music on their cell phones.

== Health facilities ==
Djougou has two major public health centers and one private hospital. Each of these facilities is run by at least one physician; the private hospital has at least two on duty at any given time. There are also several private facilities run by and midwives which perform births and do maternal and child healthcare specifically. There is also a fixed HIV testing and counseling center on the campus of the regional health center that does testing and HIV counseling on Wednesdays. As the majority of health personnel are government employees, many health workers are in Djougou by contractual obligation for a number of years; and few see it as an ideal post. Many would prefer to work down south, specifically in Cotonou, and many have left family behind in the south and plan to return as soon as possible. This may contribute to issues of motivation and work ethic.

Both the public health centers and private hospital keep regular hours, and supplies are generally available when needed. Health workers cited that a major problem is getting people to come to the health center—once they are there adequate care can usually be provided. Transportation to the health centers is particularly challenging, particularly for members of smaller villages and communities surrounding the city whose health centers do not offer comprehensive care. Mosquito nets are available at the health centers for children under 5 and pregnant women, and can also be purchased at a subsidized price from the pharmacy and other local vendors. Condoms are also widely available. Health facilities are kept fairly clean—each has running water and latrines that are far removed from areas of patient care. Hazardous waste material is separated from regular trash and disposed of separately. Most patients at the health center are pregnant women and children under 5. Pregnant women come to the health center for prenatal consultations, births, or if they suspect they have malaria. Children under 5 are brought for pneumonia, diarrhea, and malaria. Health workers agree that malnutrition is a problem among many children in Djougou, but that mothers rarely identify this as the reason for bringing their children to the health center. The health centers are much busier during malaria season—patient loads can more than double during this time, and one can see men and young adults at the clinic as well. The health centers each have an ambulance to provide emergency transportation. This is usually done in the case of labor complications in women who choose to give birth at home or in a smaller birthing facility. However, use of the ambulance is rare—in most cases family members will transport even patients in crisis situations themselves.

There is a quiet presence of traditional healers in Djougou. These gueriseurs give out powders and prayers in their homes for headaches and other simple maladies and they do not have any formal training. Many of these healers do not speak French and charge a small fee. The people of Djougou are relatively well educated and are slightly embarrassed by visiting such healers, but for cultural reasons, traditional healers are persistent and cause little harm. For small issues, it is often easier, cheaper, and more familiar than going to the health care center centre de santé and does not appear to cause any problems or restrict utilization of western medicine when time and money allow.

== Twin towns – sister cities ==
Djougou is twinned with:

- Évreux, France
- Al Wakrah, Qatar
