= Donga Department =

Department of Benin

Donga
- Department
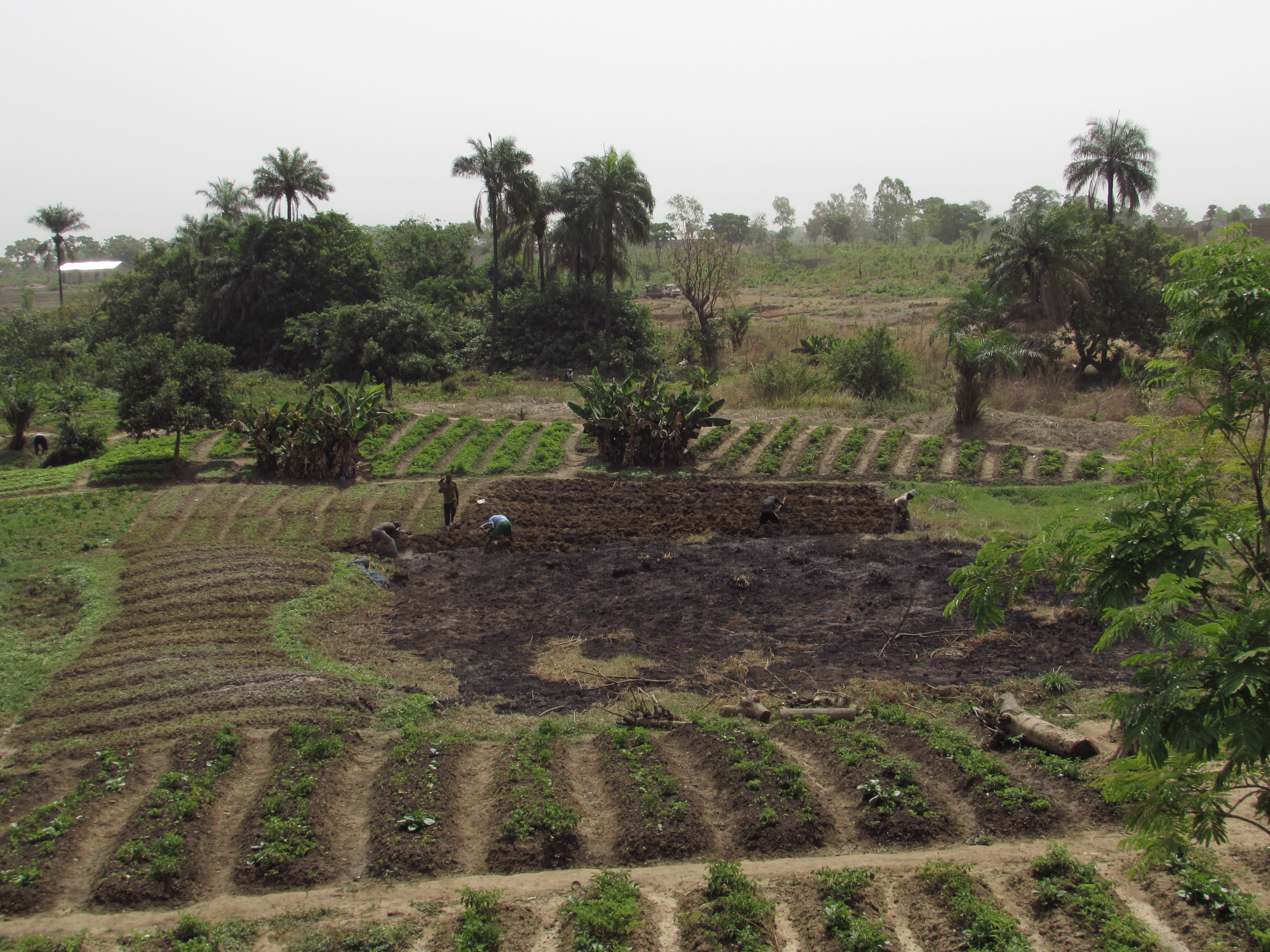
- Agriculture near Djougou, the department capital

- Map highlighting the Donga Department
- Coordinates: 9°42′N 1°40′E
- Country: Benin
- Capital: Djougou

Area
  - Total: 11,126 km^{2} (4,296 sq mi)

Population (2013 census)
  - Total: 542,605
  - Density: 48.769/km^{2} (126.31/sq mi)
- Time zone: UTC+1 (WAT)

Donga [dɔ̃ŋ.ga] is one of the twelve departments of Benin; its capital is Djougou, the fourth largest city in the country. The department of Donga was created in 1999 when it was split off from Atakora Department. Donga is subdivided into five communes, each centered at one of the principal towns: Bassila, Copargo, Djougou Rural, Djougou Urban and Ouaké.

As of 2013, the total population of the department was 543,130, with 270,754 males and 272,376 females. The proportion of women was 50.10%. The total rural population was 57.90%, while the urban population was 42.10%. The total labour force in the department was 120,021, of which 24.20% were women. The proportion of households with no level of education was 72.50%.

== Geography ==
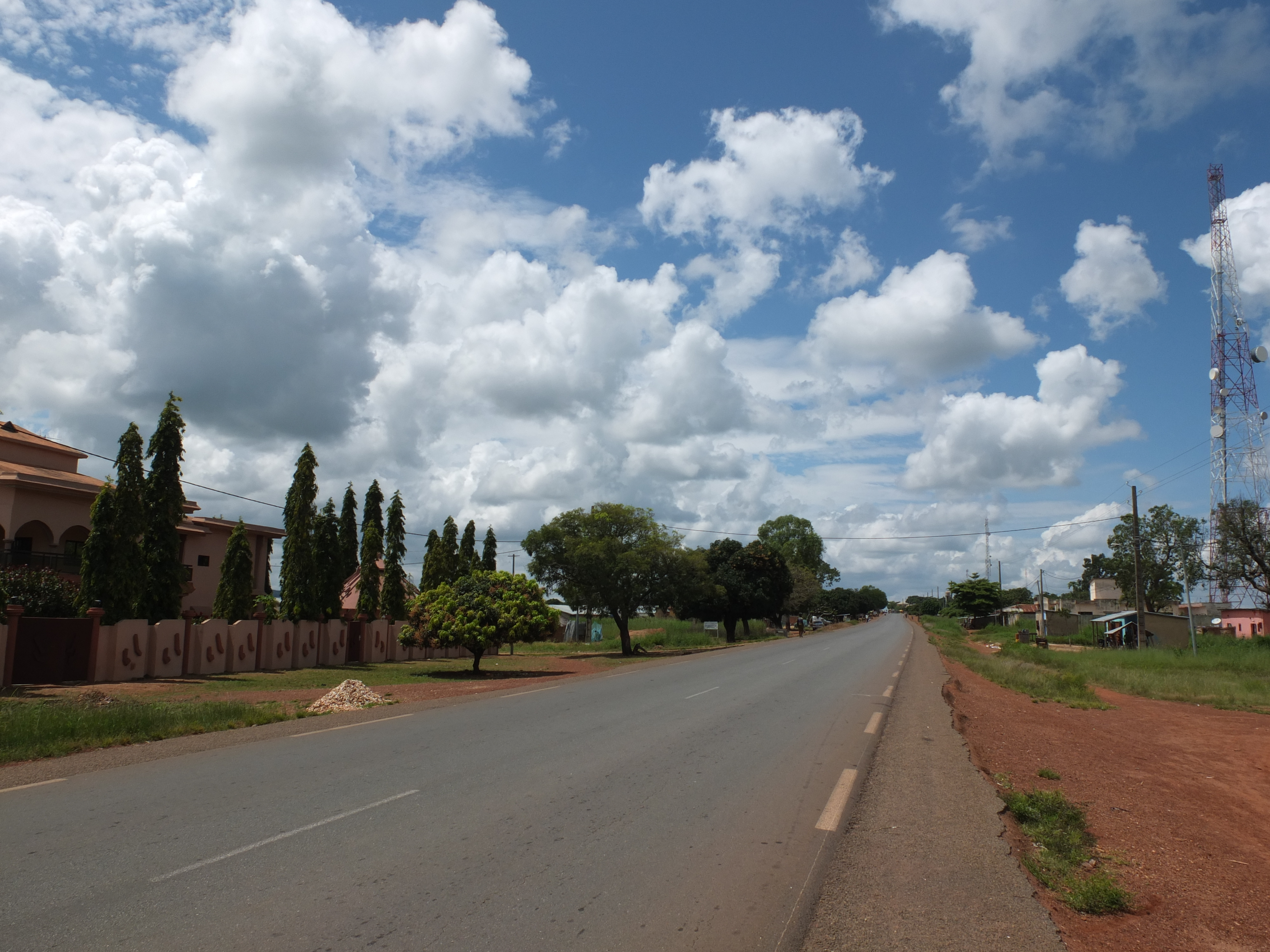
Road in Copargo, Benin

Donga Department, with an area of 10,691 square kilometres (4,128 sq mi), is located in north-central Benin, bordering Atakora Department to the north, Borgou Department to the east, Collines Department to the south, and Togo to the west. The northwest region of Benin consists mostly of forested mountains, from which two tributaries of the Niger River, the Mékrou River and the Pendjari River, originate. Mont Sokbaro, widely cited as the highest point of Benin, lies on the border of Donga Department with Togo. The northern regions of Benin receive one season of rainfall from May to September, while the southern regions receive two spells of rain from March to July and September to November. The country receives an average annual rainfall of around 1,200 mm (47 in).

=== Settlements ===
Djougou is the departmental capital; other major settlements include Aledjo-Koura, Aworo, Bassila, Bodi, Copargo, Kolokondé, Ouaké, Patargo, Pélébina, Pénéssoulou and Prekete.

== Demographics ==
Religious census
Religion	Percent(%)
Muslim	77.9%
Catholic	11.9%
Other Christian	1.8%
Other Traditional	1.8%
Other Protestant	1.1%
Methodist	1%
Vodoun	0.4%
Celestial Church	0.2%
Other	0.5%

According to Benin's 2013 census, the total population of the department was 543,130, with 270,754 males and 272,376 females. The proportion of women was 50.10%. The total rural population was 57.90%, while the urban population was 42.10%. The proportion of women of childbearing age (15 to 49 years old) was 23.30%. The foreign population was 7,760, representing 1.40% of the total population in the department. The labour force participation rate among foreigners aged 15–64 years was 30.70%. The proportion of women among the foreign population constituted 50.50%. The number of households in the department was 66,433 and the average household size was 8.2. The intercensal growth rate of the population was 4.00%.

Among women, the average age at first marriage was 20.5 and the average age at maternity was 28. The synthetic index of fertility of women was 4.6. The average number of families in a house was 1.8 and the average number of persons per room was 1.8. The total labour force in the department was 120,021, of which 24.20% were women. The proportion of households with no level of education was 72.50% and the proportion of households with children attending school was 51.40%. The crude birth rate was 34.6, the general rate of fertility was 148.70 and the gross reproduction rate was 2.30.

The main ethnolinguistic groups in the department are the Dendi and Yoruba. Other groups include the Anii, Bariba, Ede, Foodo, Kabiye, Lama, Lukpa, Tammari (also known as the Betammaribe, or Somba), Miyobe and Yom.

== Administrative divisions ==
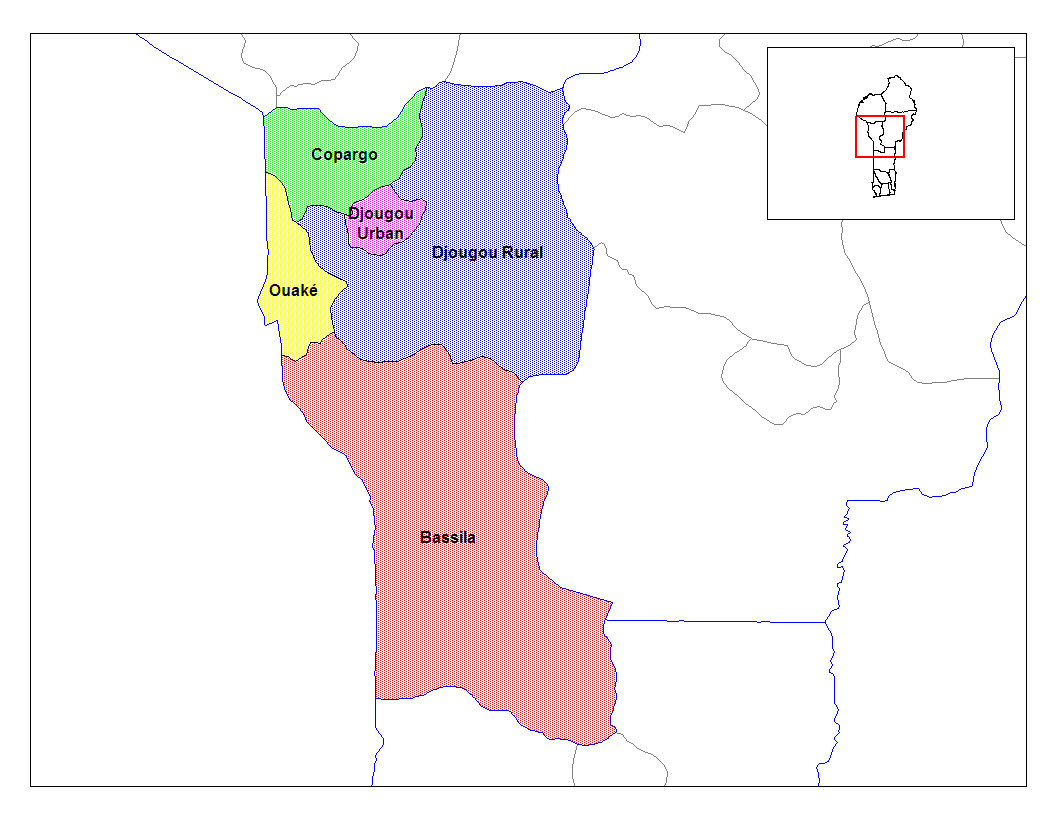
Communes of Donga

The department of Donga was created in 1999 when it was split off from Atakora Department. Its capital is Djougou. Donga is subdivided into five communes, each centered at one of the principal towns: Bassila, Copargo, Djougou Rural, Djougou Urban and Ouaké.

Benin originally had six administrative regions (départements), which have now been bifurcated to make 12. Each of the deconcentrated administrative services (directions départementales) of the sectoral ministries takes care of two administrative regions. A law passed in 1999 transformed the sous-prefectures, the lowest level of territorial administration, into local governments. Municipalities and communal councils have elected representatives who manage the administration of the regions. The latest elections of the municipal and communal councils were held in June 2015.
