= List of official languages =

This is a list of official, or otherwise administratively-recognized, languages of sovereign countries, regions, and supra-national institutions. The article also lists lots of languages which have no administrative mandate as an official language, generally describing these as de facto official languages.

== Official languages of sovereign countries, wholly or partly ==
=== A ===
Abkhaz:

- Abkhazia (with Russian; independence is disputed)

Afar:

- Djibouti (with Arabic, French, Somali)
- Ethiopia (with Amharic, Oromo, Somali, Tigrinya)

Afrikaans:

- Namibia (with English and German)
- South Africa (with English, Ndebele (Southern), Northern Sotho, Sotho, South African Sign Language, Swati, Tsonga, Tswana, Venda, Xhosa, Zulu)

Aja-Gbe:

- Benin (a national language along with Anii, Bariba, Biali, Boko, Dendi, Fon-Gbe, Foodo, Fula, Gen-Gbe, Lukpa, Mbelime, Nateni, Tammari, Waama, Waci-Gbe, Yobe, Yom, Xwela-Gbe, Yoruba, the official language is French)

Albanian:

- Albania
- Kosovo (with Serbian) (Note: The sovereignty of Kosovo is disputed. See International recognition of Kosovo.)
- Montenegro (in Gusinje, Plav, Podgorica, Rožaje, Tivat, Tuzi, and Ulcinj)
- North Macedonia (with Macedonian)

Akuapem Twi:

- Ghana (a government-sponsored language along with Ewe-Gbe, Dagaare, Dagbani, Dangme, Ga, Gonja, Kasem, Nzema, the official language is English)

Amharic:

- Ethiopia (with Afar, Oromo, Somali, Tigrinya)

Anii:

- Benin (a national language along with Aja-Gbe, Bariba, Biali, Boko, Dendi, Fon-Gbe, Foodo, Fula, Gen-Gbe, Lukpa, Mbelime, Nateni, Tammari, Waama, Waci-Gbe, Yobe, Yom, Xwela-Gbe, Yoruba, the official languages is French)

Arabic (see also List of countries where Arabic is an official language):

- Algeria (with Berber)
- Bahrain
- Chad (with French)
- Comoros (with French and Comorian)
- Djibouti (with French)
- Egypt
- Eritrea (with Tigrinya and English)
- Iraq (with Kurdish)
- Jordan
- Kuwait
- Lebanon
- Libya
- Mali (with Tuareg and French)
- Mauritania (with several national languages: Fula, Soninke, Wolof)
- Morocco (with Berber)
- Niger (with French, Buduma, Fula, Gourmanché, Hausa, Kanuri, Songhay-Zarma, Tamasheq, Tasawaq, Tebu)
- Oman
- Palestine
- Philippines (in Bangsamoro)
- Qatar
- Saudi Arabia
- Somaliland (with English and Somali; independence is disputed)
- Somalia (with Somali)
- Sudan (with English)
- Syria
- Tunisia
- United Arab Emirates (along with English)
- Yemen

Araona:

- Bolivia (with Spanish, Quechua, Guaraní and 33 other languages)

Armenian:

- Armenia

Asante Twi:

- Ghana (a government-sponsored language along with Ewe-Gbe, Dagaare, Dagbani, Dangme, Ga, Gonja, Kasem, Nzema, the official language is English)

Assamese:

- India (with 21 other regional languages, and with English as a link language)

Aymara:

- Bolivia (with Spanish, Quechua, Guaraní and 33 other languages)
- Peru (with Spanish and Quechua and other languages)

Ayoreo (Zamuco):

- Bolivia (with Spanish, Quechua, Guaraní and 33 other languages)

Azerbaijani:

- Azerbaijan

=== B ===
Balanta:

- Senegal (a national language along with Bassari, Bedik, Fula, Hassaniya, Jola, Mandinka, Mandjak, Mankanya, Noon, Safen, Serer, Soninke, Wolof, the official language is French)

Bambara:

- see Manding
- Mali (a national language along with Bomu, Bozo, Dogon, Fula, Mamara, Songhay, Soninke, Syenara, Tamasheq, the official language is French)

Bariba:

- Benin (a national language along with Aja-Gbe, Anii, Biali, Boko, Dendi, Fon-Gbe, Foodo, Fula, Gen-Gbe, Lukpa, Mbelime, Nateni, Tammari, Waama, Waci-Gbe, Yobe, Yom, Xwela-Gbe, Yoruba, the official languages is French)

Basque:

- Co-official in some autonomous communities of Spain:
  - Basque Country
  - Navarre; both with Spanish

Bassari:

- Senegal (a national language along with Balanta, Bedik, Fula, Hassaniya, Jola, Mandinka, Mandjak, Mankanya, Noon, Safen, Serer, Soninke, Wolof, the official language is French)

Baure:

- Bolivia (with Spanish, Quechua, Guaraní and 33 other languages)

Bedik:

- Senegal (a national language along with Balanta, Bassari, Fula, Hassaniya, Jola, Mandinka, Mandjak, Mankanya, Noon, Safen, Serer, Soninke, Wolof, the official language is French)

Belarusian:

- Belarus (with Russian)

Bengali:

- Bangladesh
- India (with 21 other regional languages, and with English as a link language)
- Sierra Leone

Berber:

- Algeria (with Arabic)
- Morocco (with Arabic)

Biali:

- Benin (a national language along with Aja-Gbe, Anii, Bariba, Boko, Dendi, Fon-Gbe, Foodo, Fula, Gen-Gbe, Lukpa, Mbelime, Nateni, Tammari, Waama, Waci-Gbe, Yobe, Yom, Xwela-Gbe, Yoruba, the official languages is French)

Bislama:

- Vanuatu (with English and French)

Boko:

- Benin (a national language along with Aja-Gbe, Anii, Bariba, Biali, Dendi, Fon-Gbe, Foodo, Fula, Gen-Gbe, Lukpa, Mbelime, Nateni, Tammari, Waama, Waci-Gbe, Yobe, Yom, Xwela-Gbe, Yoruba, the official languages is French)

Bomu:

- Mali (a national language along with Bambara, Bozo, Dogon, Fula, Mamara, Songhay, Soninke, Syenara, Tamasheq, the official language is French)

Bosnian:

- Bosnia and Herzegovina (with Croatian, Serbian) (de facto)

Bozo:

- Mali (a national language along with Bambara, Bomu, Dogon, Fula, Mamara, Songhay, Soninke, Syenara, Tamasheq, the official language is French)

Buduma:

- Niger (with French, Arabic, Fula, Gourmanché, Hausa, Kanuri, Songhay-Zarma, Tamasheq, Tasawaq, Tebu)

Bulgarian:

- Bulgaria

Burmese:

- Myanmar (formerly Burma)

=== C ===
Canichana:

- Bolivia (with Spanish, Quechua, Guaraní and 33 other languages)

Cantonese:

- Hong Kong (using Traditional Chinese characters); with Mandarin Chinese and English
- Macau (using Traditional Chinese characters); with Mandarin Chinese and Portuguese

Carolinian:

- Northern Mariana Islands (with Chamorro and English)

Catalan:

- Andorra,
- Co-official in some autonomous communities of Spain:
  - Balearic Islands
  - Catalonia
  - Valencian Community; all with Spanish

Cavineña:

- Bolivia (with Spanish, Quechua, Guaraní and 33 other languages)

Cayubaba:

- Bolivia (with Spanish, Quechua, Guaraní and 33 other languages)

Chácobo:

- Bolivia (with Spanish, Quechua, Guaraní and 33 other languages)

Chamorro:

- Guam (with English)
- Northern Mariana Islands (with Carolinian and English)

Chichewa:

- Malawi (with English)
- Zimbabwe (with English, Shona, Ndebele, Chirbawe, Kalanga, "Koisan" (Tshuwau), Nambya, Ndau, Zimbabwean sign language, Tonga, Tswana, Venda, Xhosa)

Chimané:

- Bolivia (with Spanish, Quechua, Guaraní and 33 other languages)

Chinese, Mandarin:

- Mainland China (using Simplified Chinese characters)
- Macau (using both Simplified Chinese characters and Traditional Chinese characters)
- Hong Kong (using both Simplified Chinese characters and Traditional Chinese characters; with Cantonese and English)
- Singapore (using Simplified Chinese characters; with English, Malay and Tamil)
- Taiwan (using Traditional Chinese characters; other official languages of Taiwan are Formosan languages, Taiwanese Hokkien, Hakka and Taiwan Sign Language.)

Chipewyan:

- Canada (in Northwest Territories)

Chirbawe (Sena):

- see Sena

Comorian:

- Comoros (with Arabic and French)

Corsican:

- France (Corsica) (with French)

Cook Islands Māori:

- Cook Islands (with English)

Cree:

- Canada (in Northwest Territories)

Croatian:

- Croatia
- Bosnia and Herzegovina (with Bosnian and Serbian) (de facto)

Czech:

- Czech Republic
- Slovakia (legislation states that a person using Czech language at a Slovak institution must be treated as if using Slovak language)

=== D ===
Dagaare:

- Ghana (a government-sponsored language along with Akan (Akuapem Twi, Ashante Twi, Fante), Ewe-Gbe, Dagbani, Dangme, Ga, Gonja, Kasem, Nzema, the official language is English)

Dagbani:

- Ghana (a government-sponsored language along with Akan (Akuapem Twi, Ashante Twi, Fante), Ewe-Gbe, Dagaare, Dangme, Ga, Gonja, Kasem, Nzema, the official language is English)

Dangme:

- Ghana (a government-sponsored language along with Akan (Akuapem Twi, Ashante Twi, Fante), Ewe-Gbe, Dagaare, Dagbani, Ga, Gonja, Kasem, Nzema, the official language is English)

Danish:

- Denmark
- Faroe Islands (with Faroese)

Dari:

- Afghanistan (a local variant of Persian, but defined as "Dari" in the Afghan constitution; together with Pashto)

Dendi:

- Benin (a national language along with Aja-Gbe, Anii, Bariba, Biali, Boko, Fon-Gbe, Foodo, Fula, Gen-Gbe, Lukpa, Mbelime, Nateni, Tammari, Waama, Waci-Gbe, Yobe, Yom, Xwela-Gbe, Yoruba, the official languages is French)

Dhivehi:

- Maldives

Dioula:

- see Manding
- Burkina Faso (a national language along with Fula, Mossi and other languages, the official language is French)

Dogon:

- Mali (a national language along with Bambara, Bomu, Bozo, Fula, Mamara, Songhay, Soninke, Syenara, Tamasheq, the official language is French)

Dutch:

- Belgium (official language with French and German)

sole official language in:
- Flanders
co-official language in:
- Brussels (with French)

- The Netherlands (sole official language in every province except Friesland, where West Frisian is co-official and the BES islands, where Papiamento and English are co-official)
  - Aruba (with Papiamento)
  - Curaçao (with Papiamento and English)
  - Sint Maarten (with English)
- Suriname

Dzongkha:

- Bhutan

=== E ===
English (see also List of countries where English is an official language):

- Australia
- The Bahamas
- Barbados
- Belize
- Botswana (but the national language is Tswana)
- Cameroon (with French)
- Canada (with French)
  - Ontario (de facto; with limited French)
  - Quebec (with French)
  - Nova Scotia (de facto; with limited French & Gaelic)
  - New Brunswick (with French)
  - Manitoba (with French)
  - British Columbia (de facto; with limited French)
  - Prince Edward Island (de facto; with limited French)
  - Saskatchewan (de facto; with limited French)
  - Alberta (de facto; with limited French)
  - Newfoundland and Labrador (de facto; with limited French, Innu-aimun, & Inuttut)
  - Northwest Territories (with 10 others)
  - Yukon (with French)
  - Nunavut (with Inuit & French)
- Curaçao (with Dutch and Papiamento)
- Dominica
- England
- Eritrea (with Tigrinya and Arabic)
- Eswatini (with Swati)
- Fiji (with Bau Fijian and Fiji Hindi)
- Gambia
- Ghana (with Akan (Akuapem Twi, Ashante Twi, Fante), Ewe-Gbe, Dagaare, Dagbani, Dangme, Ga, Gonja, Kasem, Nzema)
- Grenada
- Guyana
- Hong Kong (with Cantonese and Mandarin Chinese)
- India (with 22 regional languages)
- Republic of Ireland ("second official"; with Irish)
- Jamaica
- Kenya (with Swahili)
- Kiribati
- Lesotho (with Sotho)
- Liberia
- Malawi (with Chichewa)
- Malaysia (de facto official language with Malay; still serves as official and national language with Malay in Sabah and Sarawak)
- Malta (with Maltese)
- Marshall Islands (with Marshallese)
- Mauritius (with French)
- Micronesia, Federated States of
- Namibia (Afrikaans, German, and Oshiwambo are spoken regionally)
- Nauru (with Nauruan)
- New Zealand (with Māori and New Zealand Sign Language)
- Nigeria (with Hausa, Igbo and Yoruba)
- Pakistan (with Urdu as the national language)
- Palau (with Palauan)
- Papua New Guinea (with Tok Pisin and Hiri Motu)
- Philippines (with Filipino)
- Rwanda (with Kinyarwanda, French and Swahili
- Saint Kitts and Nevis
- Saint Lucia
- Saint Vincent and the Grenadines
- Samoa (with Samoan)
- Seychelles (with Seychellois Creole and French)
- Sierra Leone
- Singapore (with Chinese, Malay, Tamil)
- Sint Maarten (with Dutch)
- Solomon Islands
- Somaliland (with Arabic and Somali; independence is disputed)
- South Africa (with Afrikaans, Ndebele (Southern), Northern Sotho, Sotho, South African Sign Language, Swati, Tsonga, Tswana, Venda, Xhosa, Zulu)
- South Sudan
- Sri Lanka (with Sinhala and Tamil)
- Sudan (with Arabic)
- Tanzania (with Swahili)
- Tonga (with Tongan)
- Trinidad and Tobago
- Tuvalu (with Tuvaluan)
- Uganda (with Swahili)
- United Kingdom (de facto; individual countries in the UK have statutorily defined official languages, but the UK as a whole does not)
- United States (de facto; the United States does not have a statutorily defined official language. While not a law, Executive Order 14224, declaring English official, is recognized by federal agencies. Thirty-two states recognize English as official by law.)
- Vanuatu (with Bislama and French)
- Zambia
- Zimbabwe (with Shona, Ndebele, Chewa, Chirbawe, Kalanga, "Koisan" (Tshuwau), Nambya, Ndau, Zimbabwean sign language, Tonga, Tswana, Venda, Xhosa)

Ese Ejja:

- Bolivia (with Spanish, Quechua, Guaraní and 33 other languages)

Estonian:

- Estonia

Ewe-Gbe:

- Ghana (a government-sponsored language along with Akan (Akuapem Twi, Ashante Twi, Fante), Dagaare, Dagbani, Dangme Ga, Gonja, Kasem, Nzema, the official language is English)
- Togo (with French and Kabye)

=== F ===
Fante:

- Ghana (a government-sponsored language along with Ewe-Gbe, Dagaare, Dagbani, Dangme, Ga, Gonja, Kasem, Nzema, the official language is English)

Faroese:

- Faroe Islands
- Denmark

Fijian:

- Fiji (with English and Fiji Hindi)

Filipino:

- Philippines (with English)

Finnish:

- Finland (with Swedish)

Fon-Gbe:

- Benin (a national language along with Aja-Gbe, Anii, Bariba, Biali, Boko, Dendi, Fon-Gbe, Foodo, Fula, Gen-Gbe, Lukpa, Mbelime, Nateni, Tammari, Waama, Waci-Gbe, Yobe, Yom, Xwela-Gbe, Yoruba, the official languages is French)

Foodo:

- Benin (a national language along with Aja-Gbe, Anii, Bariba, Biali, Boko, Dendi, Fon-Gbe, Fula, Gen-Gbe, Lukpa, Mbelime, Nateni, Tammari, Waama, Waci-Gbe, Yobe, Yom, Xwela-Gbe, Yoruba, the official languages is French)

Formosan:

- Taiwan (other national languages of Taiwan are Mandarin, Taiwanese Hokkien, Hakka and Taiwan Sign Language.)

French (see also List of countries where French is an official language):

- Belgium (official language with Dutch and German)

sole official language in:
- Wallonia (except for the Canton of Eupen and the Canton of Sankt Vith, where German is the official language)
co-official language in:
- Brussels (with Dutch)

- Benin (with several national languages: Aja-Gbe, Anii, Bariba, Biali, Boko, Dendi, Fon-Gbe, Foodo, Fula, Gen-Gbe, Lukpa, Mbelime, Nateni, Tammari, Waama, Waci-Gbe, Yobe, Yom, Xwela-Gbe, Yoruba)
- Burkina Faso (with several national languages including Dioula, Fula, Mossi)
- Burundi (with Kirundi)
- Cameroon (with English)
- Canada (with English)
  - Quebec (with limited English)
  - New Brunswick (with English)
  - Manitoba (with English)
  - Northwest Territories (with 10 others)
  - Yukon (with English)
  - Nunavut (with Inuit & English)
- Central African Republic (with Sango)
- Chad (with Arabic)
- Comoros (with Arabic and Comorian)
- Ivory Coast
- Democratic Republic of the Congo
- Djibouti (with Arabic)
- Equatorial Guinea (with Spanish and Portuguese)
- France
  - French Guiana
  - French Polynesia
  - French Loyalty Islands
  - French Southern and Antarctic Lands
  - Scattered islands in the Indian Ocean
  - Guadeloupe
  - Martinique
  - Mayotte
  - New Caledonia
  - Réunion
  - Saint Barthélemy
  - Saint Martin
  - Saint Pierre and Miquelon
  - Wallis and Futuna
  - (Adélie Land)
  - (Clipperton Island)
- Gabon
- Guernsey (with English)
- Guinea (with several national languages: Fula, Kissi, Kpelle, Malinke, Susu, Toma, Oniyan, Wamey)
- Haiti (with Haitian Creole)
- Italy
  - Aosta Valley (with Italian)
- Jersey (with English)
- Luxembourg (with German and Luxembourgish)
- Madagascar (with Malagasy)
- Mali (with several national languages: Bambara, Bomu, Bozo, Dogon, Fula, Mamara, Songhay, Soninke, Syenara, Tamasheq)
- Mauritius (with English)
- Monaco
- Niger (with Arabic, Buduma, Fula, Gourmanché, Hausa, Kanuri, Songhay-Zarma, Tamasheq, Tasawaq, Tebu)
- Rwanda (with English, Kinyarwanda and Swahili)
- Senegal (with several national languages: Balanta, Bassari, Bedik, Fula, Hassaniya, Jola, Mandinka, Mandjak, Mankanya, Noon, Safen, Serer, Soninke, Wolof)
- Seychelles (with Seychellois Creole and English)
- Switzerland (National and official language with German, Italian, and (Romansh))

Official language in:
- Canton of Geneva
- Canton of Vaud
- Canton of Jura
- Canton of Neuchâtel
- Canton of Fribourg (with German)
- Canton of Bern (with German)
- Canton of Valais (with German)

- Togo (with Ewe-Gbe and Kabye)
- Vanuatu (with Bislama and English)

Fula:

- Benin (a national language along with Aja-Gbe, Anii, Bariba, Biali, Boko, Dendi, Fon-Gbe, Foodo, Gen-Gbe, Lukpa, Mbelime, Nateni, Tammari, Waama, Waci-Gbe, Yobe, Yom, Xwela-Gbe, Yoruba, the official languages is French)
- Burkina Faso (an official language along with Dioula, Mossi and other languages, the working language is French)
- Guinea (a national language along with Kissi, Kpelle, Malinke, Susu, Toma, Oniyan, Wamey, the official language is French)
- Mali (an official language along with Bambara, Bomu, Bozo, Dogon, Mamara, Songhay, Soninke, Syenara, Tamasheq, the working language is French)
- Mauritania (a national language along with Soninke, Wolof, the official language is Arabic)
- Niger (with French, Arabic, Buduma, Gourmanché, Hausa, Kanuri, Songhay-Zarma, Tamasheq, Tasawaq, Tebu)
- Senegal (a national language along with Balanta, Bassari, Bedik, Hassaniya, Jola, Mandinka, Mandjak, Mankanya, Noon, Safen, Serer, Soninke, Wolof, the official language is French)

=== G ===
Ga:

- Ghana (a government-sponsored language along with Akan (Akuapem Twi, Ashante Twi, Fante), Ewe-Gbe, Dagaare, Dagbani, Dangme, Gonja, Kasem, Nzema, the official language is English)

Gàidhlig:

- Scotland (along with English and Scots)

Gbe:

- see Aja-Gbe, Ewe-Gbe, Fon-Gbe, Gen-Gbe, Waci-Gbe, Xwela-Gbe

Gen-Gbe:

- Benin (a national language along with Aja-Gbe, Anii, Bariba, Biali, Boko, Dendi, Fon-Gbe, Foodo, Fula, Lukpa, Mbelime, Nateni, Tammari, Waama, Waci-Gbe, Yobe, Yom, Xwela-Gbe, Yoruba, the official languages is French)

Georgian:

- Georgia
- South Ossetia (with Ossetian and Russian; independence is disputed)
- Abkhazia (with Georgian according to the Georgian constitution; independence is disputed)

German:

- Austria (with Hungarian, Burgenland Croatian, and Slovene)
- Belgium (official language with Dutch and French)

sole official language in:
- Canton of Eupen
- Canton of Sankt Vith

- Brazil
  - Antônio Carlos
  - Santa Maria do Herval
  - Domingos Martins
  - Laranja da Terra
  - Pancas
  - Santa Maria de Jetibá
  - Vila Pavão
  - Pomerode
  - Canguçu
- Germany
- Liechtenstein
- Luxembourg (with French and Luxembourgish)
- Italy (in South Tyrol)
- Namibia (with Afrikaans and English)
- Switzerland (National and official language with French, Italian, and (Romansh))

Official language in 21 cantons:
- 17 of the 26 cantons (monolingually German)
- Canton of Grisons (with Italian and Romansh)
- Canton of Bern (with French)
- Canton of Fribourg (with French)
- Canton of Valais (with French)

Gonja:

- Ghana (a government-sponsored language along with Akan (Akuapem Twi, Ashante Twi, Fante), Ewe-Gbe, Dagaare, Dagbani, Dangme, Ga, Kasem, Nzema, the official language is English)

Gourmanché:

- Niger (with French, Arabic, Buduma, Fula, Hausa, Kanuri, Songhay-Zarma, Tamasheq, Tasawaq, Tebu)

Greek:

- Greece
- Cyprus (with Turkish)
- Albania (Greek Minority Zone of Himara, Finiq and Dervican with Albanian)

Guaraní:

- Paraguay (with Spanish)
- Bolivia (with Spanish, Quechua, Aymara and 33 other languages)

Guarayu:

- Bolivia (with Spanish, Quechua, Guaraní and 33 other languages)

Gujarati:

- India

Gwichʼin:

- Canada (in Northwest Territories)

=== H ===
Haitian Creole:

- Haiti (with French)

Hakka:

- Taiwan (other national languages of Taiwan are Mandarin, Taiwanese Hokkien, Formosan languages and Taiwan Sign Language.)

Hassaniya:

- Senegal (a national language along with Balanta, Bassari, Bedik, Fula, Jola, Mandinka, Mandjak, Mankanya, Noon, Safen, Serer, Soninke, Wolof, the official language is French)

Hausa:

- Niger (with French, Arabic, Buduma, Fula, Gourmanché, Kanuri, Songhay-Zarma, Tamasheq, Tasawaq, Tebu)
- Nigeria (with English, Igbo and Yoruba)

Hebrew:

- Israel

Hindi:

- India ("official language of the Union"; with English; 21 other regional languages namely Assamese, Bengali, Bodo, Dogri, Gujarati, Kannada, Kashmiri, Konkani, Maithili, Malayalam, Meitei (Manipuri), Marathi, Nepali, Odia, Punjabi, Sanskrit, Santhali, Sindhi, Tamil, Telugu, Urdu)
- Fiji (with English and Bau Fijian; known constitutionally as Fiji Hindi as an umbrella term to cover Standard Hindi, Urdu, as well as other Hindustani dialects)

Hiri Motu:

- Papua New Guinea (with English and Tok Pisin)

Hungarian:

- Hungary

=== I ===
Igbo:

- Nigeria (with English, Hausa and Yoruba)

Ignaciano Moxos:

- Bolivia (with Spanish, Quechua, Guaraní and 33 other languages)

Icelandic:

- Iceland

Indonesian:

- Indonesia (a standardized dialect of Malay)
- East Timor (a minority working language in East Timor)

Inuinnaqtun:

- Canada (in Northwest Territories)

Inuit:

- Canada (in Nunavut)

Inuktitut:

- Canada (in Northwest Territories)

Inuvialuktun:

- Canada (in Northwest Territories)

Irish:

- Republic of Ireland ("national"; with English being "second official")

Italian:

- Italy
- Croatia
  - Istria County (with Croatian)
- San Marino
- Slovenia
  - Slovenian Istria (with Slovene)
- Switzerland (National and official language with French, German, and (Romansh))

Official language in:
- Canton of Ticino
- Canton of Grisons (with German and Romansh)

- Vatican City (with Latin)

Itene:

- Bolivia (with Spanish, Quechua, Guaraní and 33 other languages)

Itonama:

- Bolivia (with Spanish, Quechua, Guaraní and 33 other languages)

=== J ===
Japanese:

- Japan (de facto)
- Palau (Angaur)

Javanese:

- native to Java; Indonesia
  - Special region of Yogyakarta

Jèrriais:

- Jersey

Jola:

- Senegal (a national language along with Balanta, Bassari, Bedik, Fula, Hassaniya, Mandinka, Mandjak, Mankanya, Noon, Safen, Serer, Soninke, Wolof, the official language is French)

=== K ===
Kabye:

- Togo (with French and Ewe-Gbe)

Kalaallisut:

- Greenland

Kalanga:

- Zimbabwe (with English, Shona, Ndebele, Chewa, Chirbawe, Tshuwau ("Koisan"), Nambya, Ndau, Zimbabwean sign language, Tonga, Tswana, Venda, Xhosa)

Kallawaya:

- Bolivia (with Spanish, Quechua, Guaraní and 33 other languages)

Kannada:

- India (Karnataka) (with 21 other regional Languages, Hindi and English as the languages of Union of India)

Kanuri:

- Niger (with French, Arabic, Buduma, Fula, Gourmanché, Hausa, Songhay-Zarma, Tamasheq, Tasawaq, Tebu)

Kasem:

- Ghana (a government-sponsored language along with Akan (Akuapem Twi, Ashante Twi, Fante), Ewe-Gbe, Dagaare, Dagbani, Dangme, Ga, Gonja, Nzema, the official language is English)

Kazakh:

- Kazakhstan (with Russian)

Khmer:

- Cambodia

Kinyarwanda:

- Rwanda (with English, French, and Swahili)

Kirundi:

- Burundi (with French)

Kissi:

- Guinea (a national language along with Fula, Kpelle, Malinke, Susu, Toma, Oniyan, Wamey, the official language is French)

Koisan (Tshuwau):

- Zimbabwe (with English, Shona, Ndebele, Chewa, Chirbawe, Kalanga, Nambya, Ndau, Zimbabwean sign language, Tonga, Tswana, Venda, Xhosa)

Korean:

- North Korea
- South Korea (with Korean Sign Language)

Korean Sign Language:

- South Korea (with Korean)

Kpelle:

- Guinea (a national language along with Fula, Kissi, Malinke, Susu, Toma, Oniyan, Wamey, the official language is French)

Kurdish:

- Iraq (with Arabic)

Kyrgyz:

- Kyrgyzstan (with Russian)

=== L ===
Lao:

- Laos

Latin:

- Holy See

Latvian:

- Latvia

Leco:

- Bolivia (with Spanish, Quechua, Guaraní and 33 other languages)

Lithuanian:

- Lithuania

Lukpa:

- Benin (a national language along with Aja-Gbe, Anii, Bariba, Biali, Boko, Dendi, Fon-Gbe, Foodo, Fula, Gen-Gbe, Mbelime, Nateni, Tammari, Waama, Waci-Gbe, Yobe, Yom, Xwela-Gbe, Yoruba, the official languages is French)

Luxembourgish:

- Luxembourg (with French and German)

=== M ===
Macedonian:

- North Macedonia (with Albanian)

Malagasy:

- Madagascar (with French)

Malay:

- Malaysia (with de facto official language English)
- Brunei
- Singapore (with English, Chinese and Tamil)
- Indonesia (a standardized local dialect of Malay, but treated as the separate language in Indonesia)

Malinke:

- see Manding
- Guinea (a national language along with Fula, Kissi, Kpelle, Susu, Toma, Oniyan, Wamey, the official language is French)

Maltese:

- Malta (with English and Italian)

Mamara:

- Mali (a national language along with Bambara, Bomu, Bozo, Dogon, Fula, Songhay, Soninke, Syenara, Tamasheq, the official language is French)

Manding (Mandinka, Malinke):

- see Bambara, Dioula, Malinke, Mandinka

Mandinka:

- see Manding
- Senegal (a national language along with Balanta, Bassari, Bedik, Fula, Hassaniya, Jola, Mandjak, Mankanya, Noon, Safen, Serer, Soninke, Wolof, the official language is French)

Mandjak:

- Senegal (a national language along with Balanta, Bassari, Bedik, Fula, Hassaniya, Jola, Mandinka, Mankanya, Noon, Safen, Serer, Soninke, Wolof, the official language is French)

Mankanya:

- Senegal (a national language along with Balanta, Bassari, Bedik, Fula, Hassaniya, Jola, Mandinka, Mandjak, Noon, Safen, Serer, Soninke, Wolof, the official language is French)

Manx Gaelic:

- Isle of Man (with English)

Māori:

- New Zealand (with English and New Zealand Sign Language)

Marshallese:

- Marshall Islands (with English)

Mauritian Creole:

- Mauritius

Mbelime:

- Benin (a national language along with Aja-Gbe, Anii, Bariba, Biali, Boko, Dendi, Fon-Gbe, Foodo, Fula, Gen-Gbe, Lukpa, Nateni, Tammari, Waama, Waci-Gbe, Yobe, Yom, Xwela-Gbe, Yoruba, the official languages is French)

Meitei (officially known as Manipuri):

- India (along with 21 other scheduled languages recognised by the 8th schedule of the Indian Constitution)

Mongolian:

- Mongolia

Montenegrin:

- Montenegro

Mosetén:

- Bolivia (with Spanish, Quechua, Guaraní and 33 other languages)

Mossi:

- Burkina Faso (a national language along with Dioula, Fula and other languages, the official language is French)

Movima:

- Bolivia (with Spanish, Quechua, Guaraní and 33 other languages)

=== N ===
Nambya:

- Zimbabwe (with English, Shona, Ndebele, Chewa, Chirbawe, Kalanga, "Koisan" (Tshuwau), Ndau, Zimbabwean sign language, Tonga, Tswana, Venda, Xhosa)

Nateni:

- Benin (a national language along with Aja-Gbe, Anii, Bariba, Biali, Boko, Dendi, Fon-Gbe, Foodo, Fula, Gen-Gbe, Lukpa, Mbelime, Tammari, Waama, Waci-Gbe, Yobe, Yom, Xwela-Gbe, Yoruba, the official languages is French)

Nauruan:

- Nauru (with English)

Navajo:

- Navajo Nation

Ndau:

- Zimbabwe (with English, Shona, Ndebele, Chewa, Chirbawe, Kalanga, "Koisan" (Tshuwau), Nambya, Zimbabwean sign language, Tonga, Tswana, Venda, Xhosa)

Ndebele (Northern):

- Zimbabwe (with English, Shona, Chewa, Chirbawe, Kalanga, "Koisan" (Tshuwau), Nambya, Ndau, Zimbabwean sign language, Tonga, Tswana, Venda, Xhosa)

Ndebele (Southern):

- South Africa (with Afrikaans, English, Northern Sotho, Sotho, South African Sign Language, Swati, Tsonga, Tswana, Venda, Xhosa, Zulu)

Nepali:

- Nepal

New Zealand Sign Language:

- New Zealand (with English and Māori)

Niuean:

- Niue (with English)

Noon:

- Senegal (a national language along with Balanta, Bassari, Bedik, Fula, Hassaniya, Jola, Mandinka, Mandjak, Mankanya, Safen, Serer, Soninke, Wolof, the official language is French)

North Slavey:

- Canada (in Northwest Territories)

Northern Sotho:

- South Africa (with Afrikaans, English, Ndebele (Southern), Sotho, South African Sign Language, Swati, Tsonga, Tswana, Venda, Xhosa, Zulu)

Norwegian:

- Norway (two official written forms – Bokmål and Nynorsk)

Nzema:

- Ghana (a government-sponsored language along with Akan (Akuapem Twi, Ashante Twi, Fante), Ewe-Gbe, Dagaare, Dagbani, Dangme, Ga, Gonja, Kasem, the official language is English)

=== O ===
Odia:

- India (with 21 other regional Languages, and with English as a link language)

Oniyan:

- Guinea (a national language along with Fula, Kissi, Kpelle, Malinke, Susu, Toma, Wamey, the official language is French)

Oromo:

- Ethiopia

Ossetian:

- South Ossetia (with Russian and Georgian; independence is disputed)

=== P ===
Pakawara:

- Bolivia (with Spanish, Quechua, Guaraní and 33 other languages)

Palauan:

- Palau (with English)

Papiamento:

- Aruba (with Dutch)
- Curaçao (with Dutch and English)
- Netherlands (Bonaire)

Pashto:

- Afghanistan (with Dari in Afghanistan)

Persian:

- Iran
- Afghanistan (called Dari in Afghanistan; with Pashto)
- Tajikistan (called Tajiki in Tajikistan; with Russian for "inter-ethnic communication")

Polish:

- Poland

Portuguese:

- Angola
- Brazil
- Cape Verde
- East Timor (with Tetum)
- Equatorial Guinea (with Spanish and French)
- Guinea-Bissau
- Macau (with Cantonese)
- Mozambique
- Portugal
- São Tomé and Príncipe

Punjabi:

- India

Puquina:

- Bolivia (with Spanish, Quechua, Guaraní and 33 other languages)

=== Q ===
Quechua:

- Bolivia (with Spanish, Aymara, Guaraní and 33 other languages)
- Ecuador (with Shuar and Spanish)
- Peru (with Spanish, Aymara and other languages)

=== R ===
Romanian:

- Romania
- Moldova

Romansh:

- National language in Switzerland (with German, French, and Italian)
  - Official language in canton of Grisons (with German and Italian)

Russian:

- Russia (in some regions together with regional languages)
- Abkhazia (with Abkhaz according to the Abkhazian constitution; independence is disputed)
- Belarus (with Belarusian)
- Kazakhstan (with Kazakh)
- Kyrgyzstan (with Kyrgyz)
- South Ossetia (with Ossetian and Georgian; independence is disputed)
- Tajikistan ("inter-ethnic communication"; with Tajik)
- Transnistria (with Moldovan and Ukrainian; independence is disputed)

=== S ===
Safen:

- Senegal (a national language along with Balanta, Bassari, Bedik, Fula, Hassaniya, Jola, Mandinka, Mandjak, Mankanya, Noon, Serer, Soninke, Wolof, the official language is French)

Samoan:

- American Samoa
- Samoa (with English)

Sango:

- Central African Republic (with French)

Scots:

- Scotland (With English and Scots Gaelic)

Sena:

- Zimbabwe as Chirbawe (with English, Shona, Ndebele, Chewa, Kalanga, "Koisan" (Tshuwau), Nambya, Ndau, Zimbabwean sign language, Tonga, Tswana, Venda, Xhosa)

Serbian:

- Serbia
- Bosnia and Herzegovina (with Bosnian, Croatian) (de facto)
- Kosovo (independence is disputed; with Albanian)

Serer:

- Senegal (a national language along with Balanta, Bassari, Bedik, Fula, Hassaniya, Jola, Mandinka, Mandjak, Mankanya, Noon, Safen, Soninke, Wolof, the official language is French)

Seychellois Creole:

- Seychelles (with French and English)

Shona:

- Zimbabwe (with English, Ndebele, Chewa, Chirbawe, Kalanga, "Koisan" (Tshuwau), Nambya, Ndau, Zimbabwean sign language, Tonga, Tswana, Venda, Xhosa)

Sinhala:

- Sri Lanka (with Tamil, and with English as a link language)

Sirionó:

- Bolivia (with Spanish, Quechua, Guaraní and 33 other languages)

Slovak:

- Slovakia
- Czech Republic

Slovene:

- Slovenia

Somali:

- Djibouti (with Arabic, French, Afar)
- Somalia (with Arabic)
- Somaliland (with Arabic and English; independence is disputed)

Songhay-Zarma:

- Mali (a national language along with Bambara, Bomu, Bozo, Dogon, Fula, Mamara, Soninke, Syenara, Tamasheq, the official language is French)
- Niger (with French, Arabic, Buduma, Fula, Gourmanché, Hausa, Kanuri, Tamasheq, Tasawaq, Tebu)

Soninke:

- Mali (a national language along with Bambara, Bomu, Bozo, Dogon, Fula, Mamara, Songhay, Syenara, Tamasheq, the official language is French)
- Mauritania (a national language along with Fula, Wolof, the official language is Arabic)
- Senegal (a national language along with Balanta, Bassari, Bedik, Fula, Hassaniya, Jola, Mandinka, Mandjak, Mankanya, Noon, Safen, Serer, Wolof, the official language is French)

Sonsorolese:

- Palau (Sonsorol)

Sotho:

- Lesotho (with English)
- South Africa (with Afrikaans, English, Ndebele (Southern), Northern Sotho, South African Sign Language, Swati, Tsonga, Tswana, Venda, Xhosa, Zulu)

South African Sign Language:

- South Africa (with Afrikaans, English, Ndebele (Southern), Northern Sotho, Swati, Tsonga, Tswana, Venda, Xhosa, Zulu)

South Slavey:

- Canada (in Northwest Territories)

Spanish:

- Argentina (de facto)
- Bolivia (with Aymara, Quechua, Guaraní, and 33 other languages)
- Chile
  - Easter Island (with Rapa Nui)
- Colombia
- Costa Rica
- Cuba
- Dominican Republic
- Ecuador (with Quechua and Shuar)
- El Salvador
- Equatorial Guinea (with French and Portuguese)
- Guatemala
- Honduras
- Mexico (de facto)
- Nicaragua
- Panama
- Paraguay (with Guaraní)
- Peru (with Aymara, Quechua and other languages)
- Spain (Aranese, Basque, Catalan, and Galician are co-official in some regions)
- United States (in the US territory of Puerto Rico)
- Uruguay (de facto)
- Venezuela
- Western Sahara (with Arabic)

Susu:

- Guinea (a national language along with Fula, Kissi, Kpelle, Malinke, Toma, Oniyan, Wamey, the official language is French)

Swahili:

- Kenya (with English)
- Rwanda (with English, French and Kinyarwanda)
- Tanzania (de facto; with English)
- Uganda (since 2005; with English)

Swati:

- Eswatini (with English)
- South Africa (with Afrikaans, English, Ndebele (Southern), Northern Sotho, Sotho, South African Sign Language, Tsonga, Tswana, Venda, Xhosa, Zulu)

Swedish:

- Sweden
- Finland (with Finnish)
- Åland (monolingually Swedish) (an autonomous province under Finnish sovereignty)

Syenara:

- Mali (a national language along with Bambara, Bomu, Bozo, Dogon, Fula, Mamara, Songhay, Soninke, Tamasheq, the official language is French)

=== T ===
Tacana:

- Bolivia (with Spanish, Quechua, Guaraní and 33 other languages)

Tahitian:

- French Polynesia (with French)

Taiwan Sign Language:

- Taiwan (other national languages of Taiwan are Mandarin, Formosan languages, Hakka and Taiwanese Hokkien.)

Taiwanese Hokkien:

- Taiwan (using Traditional Chinese characters and/or pe̍h-oē-jī (Latin letters); other national languages of Taiwan are Mandarin, Formosan languages, Hakka and Taiwan Sign Language.)

Tajik:

- Tajikistan (a variant of Persian written in Cyrillic)

Tagalog:

- see Filipino

Tapieté:

- Bolivia (with Spanish, Quechua, Guaraní and 33 other languages)

Tamasheq:

- Mali (a national language along with Bambara, Bomu, Bozo, Dogon, Fula, Mamara, Songhay, Soninke, Syenara, the official language is French)
- Niger (with French, Arabic, Buduma, Fula, Gourmanché, Hausa, Kanuri, Songhay-Zarma, Tasawaq, Tebu)

Tamil:

- India (Tamil Nadu, Pondicherry) (with 21 other languages, and with Hindi and English as the link language and official language of Union)
- Singapore (with English, Chinese and Malay)
- Sri Lanka (with Sinhala, and with English as a link language)

Tammari:

- Benin (a national language along with Aja-Gbe, Anii, Bariba, Biali, Boko, Dendi, Fon-Gbe, Foodo, Fula, Gen-Gbe, Lukpa, Mbelime, Nateni, Waama, Waci-Gbe, Yobe, Yom, Xwela-Gbe, Yoruba, the official languages is French)

Tasawaq:

- Niger (with French, Arabic, Buduma, Fula, Gourmanché, Hausa, Kanuri, Songhay-Zarma, Tamasheq, Tebu)

Tebu:

- Niger (with French, Arabic, Buduma, Fula, Gourmanché, Hausa, Kanuri, Songhay-Zarma, Tamasheq, Tasawaq)

Telugu:

- India (with 21 other regional Languages, and with English as a link language)

Tetum:

- East Timor (with Portuguese)

Thai:

- Thailand

Tigrinya:

- Eritrea (with Arabic and English)
- Ethiopia (with Afar, Amharic, Oromo and Somali)

Tłı̨chǫ:

- Canada (in Northwest Territories)

Tobian:

- Palau (Hatohobei)

Tok Pisin:

- Papua New Guinea (with English and Hiri Motu)

Tokelauan:

- Tokelau (with English)

Toma:

- Guinea (a national language along with Fula, Kissi, Kpelle, Malinke, Susu, Oniyan, Wamey, the official language is French)

Tonga:

- Zimbabwe (with English, Shona, Ndebele, Chewa, Chirbawe, Kalanga, "Koisan" (Tshuwau), Nambya, Ndau, Zimbabwean sign language, Tswana, Venda, Xhosa)

Tongan:

- Tonga (with English)

Toromono:

- Bolivia (with Spanish, Quechua, Guaraní and 33 other languages)

Trinitario Moxos:

- Bolivia (with Spanish, Quechua, Guaraní and 33 other languages)

Tsonga:

- South Africa (with Afrikaans, English, Ndebele (Southern), Northern Sotho, Sotho, South African Sign Language, Swati, Tswana, Venda, Xhosa, Zulu)

Tswana:

- Botswana (with English)
- South Africa (with Afrikaans, English, Ndebele (Southern), Northern Sotho, Sotho, South African Sign Language, Swati, Tsonga, Venda, Xhosa, Zulu)
- Zimbabwe (with English, Shona, Ndebele, Chewa, Chirbawe, Kalanga, "Koisan" (Tshuwau), Nambya, Ndau, Zimbabwean sign language, Tonga, Venda, Xhosa)

Turkish:

- Turkey
- Cyprus (with Greek)
- Turkish Republic of Northern Cyprus (independence disputed)

Turkmen:

- Turkmenistan

Tuvaluan:

- Tuvalu (with English)

=== U ===
Ukrainian:

- Ukraine
- Transnistria (with Moldovan and Russian; independence is disputed)

Urdu:

- Pakistan (with English)
- India (Urdu dialect and in script it is Sanscrit with 21 other regional languages, and with English as a link language)

Uru-Chipaya:

- Bolivia (with Spanish, Quechua, Guaraní and 33 other languages)

Uzbek:

- Uzbekistan

=== V ===
Venda:

- South Africa (with Afrikaans, English, Ndebele (Southern), Northern Sotho, Sotho, South African Sign Language, Swati, Tsonga, Tswana, Xhosa, Zulu)
- Zimbabwe (with English, Shona, Ndebele, Chewa, Chirbawe, Kalanga, "Koisan" (Tshuwau), Nambya, Ndau, Zimbabwean sign language, Tonga, Tswana, Xhosa)

Vietnamese:

- Vietnam

=== W ===
Waama:

- Benin (a national language along with Aja-Gbe, Anii, Bariba, Biali, Boko, Dendi, Fon-Gbe, Foodo, Fula, Gen-Gbe, Lukpa, Mbelime, Nateni, Tammari, Waci-Gbe, Yobe, Yom, Xwela-Gbe, Yoruba, the official languages is French)

Waci-Gbe:

- Benin (a national language along with Aja-Gbe, Anii, Bariba, Biali, Boko, Dendi, Fon-Gbe, Foodo, Fula, Gen-Gbe, Lukpa, Mbelime, Nateni, Tammari, Waama, Yobe, Yom, Xwela-Gbe, Yoruba, the official languages is French)

Wamey:

- Guinea (a national language along with Fula, Kissi, Kpelle, Malinke, Susu, Toma, Oniyan, the official language is French)

Weenhayek:

- Bolivia (with Spanish, Quechua, Guaraní and 33 other languages)

Welsh:

- United Kingdom (limited de jure official status in Wales)

Wolof:

- Mauritania (a national language along with Fula, Soninke, the official language is Arabic)
- Senegal (a national language along with Balanta, Bassari, Bedik, Fula, Hassaniya, Jola, Mandinka, Mandjak, Mankanya, Noon, Safen, Serer, Soninke, the official language is French)

=== X ===
Xhosa:

- South Africa (with Afrikaans, English, Ndebele (Southern), Northern Sotho, Sotho, South African Sign Language, Swati, Tsonga, Tswana, Venda, Zulu)
- Zimbabwe (with English, Shona, Ndebele, Chewa, Chirbawe, Kalanga, "Koisan" (Tshuwau), Nambya, Ndau, Zimbabwean sign language, Tonga, Tswana, Venda)

Xwela-Gbe:

- Benin (a national language along with Aja-Gbe, Anii, Bariba, Biali, Boko, Dendi, Fon-Gbe, Foodo, Fula, Gen-Gbe, Lukpa, Mbelime, Nateni, Tammari, Waama, Waci-Gbe, Yobe, Yom, Yoruba, the official languages is French)

=== Y ===
Yaminawa:

- Bolivia (with Spanish, Quechua, Guaraní and 33 other languages)

Yobe:

- Benin (a national language along with Aja-Gbe, Anii, Bariba, Biali, Boko, Dendi, Fon-Gbe, Foodo, Fula, Gen-Gbe, Lukpa, Mbelime, Nateni, Tammari, Waama, Waci-Gbe, Yom, Xwela-Gbe, Yoruba, the official languages is French)

Yom:

- Benin (a national language along with Aja-Gbe, Anii, Bariba, Biali, Boko, Dendi, Fon-Gbe, Foodo, Fula, Gen-Gbe, Lukpa, Mbelime, Nateni, Tammari, Waama, Waci-Gbe, Yobe, Xwela-Gbe, Yoruba, the official languages is French)

Yoruba:

- Benin (a national language along with Aja-Gbe, Anii, Bariba, Biali, Boko, Dendi, Fon-Gbe, Foodo, Fula, Gen-Gbe, Lukpa, Mbelime, Nateni, Tammari, Waama, Waci-Gbe, Yobe, Xwela-Gbe, Yom, the official languages is French)
- Nigeria (with English, Hausa and Igbo)

Yuki:

- Bolivia (with Spanish, Quechua, Guaraní and 33 other languages)

Yuracaré:

- Bolivia (with Spanish, Quechua, Guaraní and 33 other languages)

=== Z ===
Zimbabwean sign language:

- Zimbabwe (with English, Shona, Ndebele, Chewa, Chirbawe, Kalanga, "Koisan" (Tshuwau), Nambya, Ndau, Tonga, Tswana, Venda, Xhosa)

Zulu:

- South Africa (with Afrikaans, English, Ndebele (Southern), Northern Sotho, Sotho, South African Sign Language, Swati, Tsonga, Tswana, Venda, Xhosa)

== List of languages by the number of countries in which they are the most widely used ==
This is a ranking of languages by number of sovereign countries in which they are de jure or de facto official, co-official, an administrative or working language.

Language	Number of countries language spoken
English	101
Arabic	60
French	51
Standard Chinese	33
Spanish	31
Persian	29
German	18
Russian	16
Malay	13
Portuguese	12

== List of languages by number of countries in which they are the official language ==
This is a ranking of languages by number of sovereign countries in which they are de jure or de facto official, although there are no precise inclusion criteria or definition of a language. An '*' (asterisk) indicates a country whose independence is disputed.

Partially recognized or de facto independent countries are denoted by an asterisk (*)

Language	World	Africa	Americas	Asia	Europe	Oceania	Countries
English	58	23	14	4	3	14	United States, (Note: In the United States of America, English is the language of the Declaration of Independence and the Constitution of the United States and is the working language of the federal government. It was first declared the official language by Executive Order 14224 in 2025. Some states - such as Arizona, California, Florida, New Mexico, and Texas - provide official documents in both Spanish and English. Attempts to designate English as the official language of the federal government of the United States by act of Congress have not succeeded. See also Languages of the United States.) United Kingdom, Canada, Australia, New Zealand, Ireland, South Africa, India, Nigeria (See the full list)
French	26	18	2	–	5	1	France, Canada, Belgium, Switzerland, Madagascar, Monaco, Haiti, Vanuatu (See the full list)
Arabic	23–26*	12–14*	–	11–12*	–	–	Egypt, Sudan, Algeria, Iraq, Morocco, Saudi Arabia, United Arab Emirates, Palestine* (See the full list)
Spanish	20	1	18	–	1	–	Spain, Colombia, Argentina, Mexico (See the full list)
Portuguese	9	6	1	1	1	–	Portugal, Brazil, Mozambique, Angola, East Timor (See the full list)
German	6	–	–	–	6	–	Germany, Austria, Switzerland, Belgium, Luxembourg, Liechtenstein (See the full list)
Russian	5–8*	–	–	3	2–5*	–	Russia, Kazakhstan, Belarus, Kyrgyzstan, Tajikistan, Abkhazia*, South Ossetia*, Transnistria*. (See the full list)
Swahili	5	5	–	–	–	–	Democratic Republic of the Congo, Kenya, Rwanda, Tanzania, Uganda
Serbo-Croatian	4–5*	–	–	–	4–5*	–	Serbia (known as Serbian), Croatia (known as Croatian), Montenegro (known as Montenegrin), Bosnia and Herzegovina (known as Bosnian, Croatian and Serbian), Kosovo* (known as Serbian)
Italian	4	–	–	–	4	–	Italy, Switzerland, San Marino, Vatican City
Malay	4	–	–	4	–	–	Malaysia (known as Malaysian), Indonesia (known as Indonesian), Singapore, Brunei
Dutch	3	–	1	–	2	–	Netherlands, Belgium, Suriname
Persian	3	–	–	3	–	–	Iran, Afghanistan (known as Dari), Tajikistan (known as Tajik)
Sotho	3	3	–	–	–	–	South Africa, Lesotho, Zimbabwe
Tswana	3	3	–	–	–	–	Botswana, South Africa, Zimbabwe
Albanian	2–3*	–	–	–	2–3*	–	Albania, Kosovo*, North Macedonia
Standard Chinese	2–3*	–	–	2–3*	–	–	China, Singapore, Taiwan*
Romanian	2–3*	–	–	–	2-3*	–	Romania, Moldova, Transnistria*
Somali	2–3*	2–3*	–	–	–	–	Somalia, Ethiopia, and Somaliland*
Turkish	2–3*	–	–	–	2–3*	–	Turkey, Northern Cyprus* and Cyprus
Aymara	2	–	2	–	–	–	Bolivia and Peru
Berber	2	2	–	–	–	–	Algeria and Morocco
Chichewa	2	2	–	–	–	–	Malawi and Zimbabwe
Fula	2	2	–	–	-	–	Burkina Faso and Mali
Greek	2	–	–	–	2	–	Greece and Cyprus
Guarani	2	–	2	–	–	–	Paraguay and Bolivia
Hindi	2	–	–	2	–	–	India, Fiji
Quechua	2	–	2	–	–	–	Bolivia and Peru
Korean	2	–	–	2	–	–	North Korea and South Korea
Kurdish	2	–	–	2	–	–	Iraq and Armenia
Rwanda-Rundi	2	2	–	–	–	–	Burundi (known as Kirundi) & Rwanda (known as Kinyarwanda)
Swati	2	2	–	–	–	–	Eswatini (Swaziland) and South Africa
Swedish	2	–	–	–	2	–	Sweden and Finland
Tamil	2	–	–	2	–	–	Sri Lanka and Singapore
Tigrinya	2	2	–	–	–	–	Eritrea and Ethiopia
Venda	2	2	–	–	–	–	South Africa and Zimbabwe

== Official regional and minority languages ==
Abaza:

- Karachay–Cherkessia (state language; with Cherkess, Karachay, Nogai and Russian)

Adyghe:

- Adygea (state language; with Russian)

Aghul:

- Dagestan (as one of the Dagestan peoples languages; with Russian)

Ahtna

- Alaska (with Inupiaq, Siberian Yupik, Central Alaskan Yup'ik, Alutiiq, Unangax̂, Dena'ina, Deg Xinag, Holikachuk, Koyukon, Upper Kuskokwim, Gwich'in, Lower Tanana, Upper Tanana, Tanacross, Hän, Eyak, Tlingit, Haida, Tsimshian, and English)

Aklanon:

- Visayas (Philippines) (with Filipino, English, Bikol, Cebuano, Hiligaynon, Ilocano, Kinaray-a, Surigaonon, Tagalog, and Waray)

Albanian:

- Kosovo
- North Macedonia (in some municipalities)
- Montenegro (The only official language is Montenegrin, while Albanian is in official use along with Serbian, Bosnian and Croatian)

Altay:

- Altay, Republic of (state language; with Russian)

Alutiiq:

- Alaska (with Inupiaq, Siberian Yupik, Central Alaskan Yup'ik, Unangax̂, Dena'ina, Deg Xinag, Holikachuk, Koyukon, Upper Kuskokwim, Gwich'in, Lower Tanana, Upper Tanana, Tanacross, Hän, Ahtna, Eyak, Tlingit, Haida, Tsimshian, and English)

Arabic:

- Philippines (mainly in Mindanao)

Aranese see Occitan

Armenian:

- Nagorno Karabagh

Aromanian:

- Kruševo

Assamese:

- India (with Hindi, English {as a "subsidiary official language"} and 20 other official languages)
  - Assam

Avar:

- Dagestan (as one of the Dagestan peoples languages; with Russian)

Azeri:

- Dagestan (as one of the Dagestan peoples languages; with Russian)

Balkar:

- Kabardino-Balkaria (state language; with Kabardian and Russian)

Bashkir:

- Bashkortostan (state language; with Russian)

Basque:

- Basque Autonomous Community (with Spanish)
- Navarre (in some areas with Spanish)

Bengali:

- India (as a "subsidiary official language"} and 20 other official languages; second most spoken Indian Language)
  - Andaman and Nicobar Islands
  - Assam
  - Tripura
  - West Bengal

Bikol:

- Luzon (Philippines) (with Filipino, English, Aklanon, Cebuano, Hiligaynon, Ibanag, Ilocano, Ivatan, Kapampangan, Kinaray-a, Pangasinan, Sambal, Surigaonon, Tagalog, and Waray)

Bosnian:

- part of Serbia
  - Sandžak region
- Montenegro (with Montenegrin, Albanian, Croatian and Serbian)

Buryat:

- Buryatia (state language; with Russian)
- Zabaykalsky Krai
  - Agin-Buryat Okrug (authorized language)

Cantonese Chinese:

- China:
  - Some provinces Canton Province (with Mandarin)
  - Hong Kong (for Chinese language, Cantonese is spoken de facto; co-official with English)
  - Macau (for Chinese language, Cantonese is spoken de facto; co-official with Portuguese)

Catalan:

- parts of Spain
  - Balearic Islands (with Spanish)
  - Catalonia (with Spanish)
  - Valencia (named as Valencian, with Spanish)
- parts of France
  - Pyrénées Orientales
- parts of Italy
  - Alghero

Cebuano:

- Visayas and Mindanao (Philippines) (with Filipino, English, Aklanon, Bikol, Chavacano, Hiligaynon, Ilocano, Kinaray-a, Maguindanao, Maranao, Surigaonon, Tagalog, Tausug, Waray, and Yakan)

Central Alaskan Yup'ik

- Alaska (with Inupiaq, Siberian Yupik, Alutiiq, Unangax̂, Dena'ina, Deg Xinag, Holikachuk, Koyukon, Upper Kuskokwim, Gwich'in, Lower Tanana, Upper Tanana, Tanacross, Hän, Ahtna, Eyak, Tlingit, Haida, Tsimshian, and English)

Chavacano:

- Mindanao (Philippines) (with Filipino, English, Cebuano, Hiligaynon, Ilocano, Maguindanao, Maranao, Surigaonon, Tagalog, Tausug, and Yakan)

Chechen:

- Chechnya (state language; with Russian)
- Dagestan (as one of the Dagestan peoples languages; with Russian)

Cherkess:

- Karachay–Cherkessia (state language; with Abaza, Karachay, Nogai and Russian)

Cherokee:

- Cherokee Nation tribal jurisdiction area in Oklahoma, United States.

Chipewyan:

- Northwest Territories (with Cree, English, French, Gwich'in, Inuinnaqtun, Inuktitut, Inuvialuktun, North Slavey, South Slavey and Tłįchǫ (Dogrib))

Chukchi:

- Sakha (local official language; in localities with Chukchi population)

Chuvash:

- Chuvashia (state language; with Russian)

Cree:

- Northwest Territories (with Chipewyan, English, French, Gwich'in, Inuinnaqtun, Inuktitut, Inuvialuktun, North Slavey, South Slavey and Tłįchǫ (Dogrib))

Crimean Tatar

- Crimea (with Russian and Ukrainian)

Croatian:

- part of Austria
  - Burgenland (with German and Hungarian)*part of Italy
  - Molise
- part of Serbia
  - Vojvodina (with Hungarian, Pannonian Rusyn, Romanian, Serbian and Slovak)
- Montenegro (with Montenegrin, Albanian, Bosnian and Serbian)

Dargwa:

- Dagestan (as one of the Dagestan peoples languages; with Russian)

Deg Xinag

- Alaska (with Inupiaq, Siberian Yupik, Central Alaskan Yup'ik, Alutiiq, Unangax̂, Dena'ina, Holikachuk, Koyukon, Upper Kuskokwim, Gwich'in, Lower Tanana, Upper Tanana, Tanacross, Hän, Ahtna, Eyak, Tlingit, Haida, Tsimshian, and English)

Dena'ina

- Alaska (with Inupiaq, Siberian Yupik, Central Alaskan Yup'ik, Alutiiq, Unangax̂, Deg Xinag, Holikachuk, Koyukon, Upper Kuskokwim, Gwich'in, Lower Tanana, Upper Tanana, Tanacross, Hän, Ahtna, Eyak, Tlingit, Haida, Tsimshian, and English)

Dolgan:

- Sakha (local official language; in localities with Dolgan population)

Dutch:

- The Nord-Pas-de-Calais (France) (French Flemish dialect with French, English for some part of the region)

English:

- parts of Canada:

- Alberta
- British Columbia
- Manitoba (with French)
- Newfoundland and Labrador
- Nova Scotia
- Ontario
- Prince Edward Island
- Quebec
- Saskatchewan
- New Brunswick (with French)
- Northwest Territories (with Chipewyan, Cree, French, Gwich'in, Inuinnaqtun, Inuktitut, Inuvialuktun, Slavey (North and South) and Tłįchǫ)
- Nunavut (with Inuktitut, Inuinnaqtun, and French)
- Yukon (with French)

- The United Kingdom:

- England
- Northern Ireland
- Scotland (with Scottish Gaelic in some municipalities)
- Wales (with Welsh)
- Isle of Man (with Manx Gaelic)
- Guernsey (with French)
- Jersey (with French)

- parts of the United States. See English-only movement. English is an official language in the following states and territories:
  - Alabama
  - Alaska (with Inupiaq, Siberian Yupik, Central Alaskan Yup'ik, Alutiiq, Unangax̂, Dena'ina, Deg Xinag, Holikachuk, Koyukon, Upper Kuskokwim, Gwich'in, Lower Tanana, Upper Tanana, Tanacross, Hän, Ahtna, Eyak, Tlingit, Haida, and Tsimshian)
  - Arkansas
  - California
  - Colorado
  - Florida
  - Georgia
  - Hawaii (with Hawaiian language)
  - Illinois
  - Indiana
  - Iowa
  - Kentucky
  - Massachusetts
  - Minnesota
  - Mississippi
  - Montana
  - Nebraska
  - New Hampshire
  - North Carolina
  - North Dakota
  - Puerto Rico (with Spanish)
  - South Carolina
  - South Dakota (with Lakota & Dakota)
  - Texas
  - Tennessee
  - U.S. Virgin Islands
  - Utah
  - Virginia
  - West Virginia
  - Wyoming

Erzya:

- Mordovia (state language; with Moksha and Russian)

Even:

- Sakha (local official language; in localities with Even population)

Evenki:

- Sakha (local official language; in localities with Evenki population)

Eyak

- Alaska (with Inupiaq, Siberian Yupik, Central Alaskan Yup'ik, Alutiiq, Unangax̂, Dena'ina, Deg Xinag, Holikachuk, Koyukon, Upper Kuskokwim, Gwich'in, Lower Tanana, Upper Tanana, Tanacross, Hän, Ahtna, Tlingit, Haida, Tsimshian, and English)

Faroese:

- Faroe Islands (with Danish)

Finnish:

- Karelia (authorized language; with Karelian and Veps)

French:

- parts of Canada

- New Brunswick (co-official with English)
- Northwest Territories (with Chipewyan, Cree, English, Gwich'in, Inuinnaqtun, Inuktitut, Inuvialuktun, Slavey (North and South) and Tłįchǫ)
- Nunavut (with English, Inuinnaqtun, Inuktitut)
- Quebec
- Yukon (with English)

- Guernsey (with English)
- Jersey (with English)
- Puducherry (co-official with Tamil in the Union Territory of Puducherry. Also Telugu and Malayalam are its regional official languages)
- part of Italy
  - Aosta (co-official with Italian)
- part of United States with Louisiana

Frisian (West):

- The Netherlands: co-official in the province of Friesland (with Dutch)

Friulian:

- The Friuli region of northeastern Italy

Gagauz:

- Gagauzia (Moldova) (with Russian)

Galician:

- part of Spain
  - Galicia (with Spanish)

German:

- Italy
  - South Tyrol (together with Italian and Ladin)

Greek:

- parts of south Albania
- parts of south Italy
  - Salento (Grecia Salentina, together with Italian)
  - Calabria (Bovesia, together with Italian)

Guaraní:

- Bolivia
- Paraguay
- in Argentina
  - Corrientes Province (co-official with Spanish)

Gujarati:

- India (with 21 other regional languages)
  - Dadra and Nagar Haveli and Daman and Diu
  - Gujarat

Gwich'in:

- Alaska (with Inupiaq, Siberian Yupik, Central Alaskan Yup'ik, Alutiiq, Unangax̂, Dena'ina, Deg Xinag, Holikachuk, Koyukon, Upper Kuskokwim, Lower Tanana, Upper Tanana, Tanacross, Hän, Ahtna, Eyak, Tlingit, Haida, Tsimshian, and English)
- Northwest Territories (with Cree, Chipewyan, English, French, Inuinnaqtun, Inuktitut, Inuvialuktun, North Slavey, South Slavey and Tłįchǫ (Dogrib))

Haida

- Alaska (with Inupiaq, Siberian Yupik, Central Alaskan Yup'ik, Alutiiq, Unangax̂, Dena'ina, Deg Xinag, Holikachuk, Koyukon, Upper Kuskokwim, Gwich'in, Lower Tanana, Upper Tanana, Tanacross, Hän, Ahtna, Eyak, Tlingit, Tsimshian, and English)

Hän

- Alaska (with Inupiaq, Siberian Yupik, Central Alaskan Yup'ik, Alutiiq, Unangax̂, Dena'ina, Deg Xinag, Holikachuk, Koyukon, Upper Kuskokwim, Gwich'in, Lower Tanana, Upper Tanana, Tanacross, Ahtna, Eyak, Tlingit, Haida, Tsimshian, and English)

Hawaiian:

- Hawaii (with English)

Hiligaynon:

- Visayas and Mindanao (Philippines) (with Filipino, English, Aklanon, Bikol, Cebuano, Chavacano, Hiligaynon, Ilocano, Kinaray-a, Maguindanao, Maranao, Surigaonon, Tagalog, Tausug, Waray, and Yakan)

Hindi:

- India (with 21 other regional languages)
  - Andaman and Nicobar Islands
  - Bihar
  - Chhattisgarh
  - Delhi Territory
  - Haryana
  - Jharkhand
  - Madhya Pradesh
  - Rajasthan
  - Uttarakhand
  - Uttar Pradesh

Holikachuk

- Alaska (with Inupiaq, Siberian Yupik, Central Alaskan Yup'ik, Alutiiq, Unangax̂, Dena'ina, Deg Xinag, Koyukon, Upper Kuskokwim, Gwich'in, Lower Tanana, Upper Tanana, Tanacross, Hän, Ahtna, Eyak, Tlingit, Haida, Tsimshian, and English)

Hungarian:

- part of Serbia
  - Vojvodina (with Croatian, Serbian, Romanian, Slovak and Ruthenian)
- part of Romania
- part of Slovenia
- part of Croatia
- part of Slovakia
- part of Austria

Ibanag:

- Luzon (Philippines) (with Filipino, English, Bikol, Ilocano, Ivatan, Kapampangan, Pangasinan, Sambal, and Tagalog)

Ilocano:

- Luzon and Mindanao (Philippines) (with Filipino, English, Bikol, Cebuano, Chavacano, Hiligaynon, Ibanag, Ilocano, Ivatan, Kapampangan, Maguindanao, Maranao, Pangasinan, Sambal, Surigaonon, Tagalog, Tausug, and Yakan.)

Ingush:

- Ingushetia (state language; with Russian)

Inuinnaqtun:

- Northwest Territories (with Cree, Chipewyan, English, French, Gwich'in, Inuktitut, Inuvialuktun, North Slavey, South Slavey and Tłįchǫ (Dogrib))
- Nunavut (with English, French, and Inuktitut)

Inuktitut:

- Nunavut (with English, French, and Inuinnaqtun)
- Northwest Territories (with Cree, Chipewyan, English, French, Gwich'in, Inuinnaqtun, Inuvialuktun, North Slavey, South Slavey and Tłįchǫ (Dogrib))

Inupiaq

- Alaska (with Siberian Yupik, Central Alaskan Yup'ik, Alutiiq, Unangax̂, Dena'ina, Deg Xinag, Holikachuk, Koyukon, Upper Kuskokwim, Gwich'in, Lower Tanana, Upper Tanana, Tanacross, Hän, Ahtna, Eyak, Tlingit, Haida, Tsimshian, and English)

Inuvialuktun:

- Northwest Territories (with Cree, Chipewyan, English, French, Gwich'in, Inuinnaqtun, Inuktitut, North Slavey, South Slavey and Tłįchǫ (Dogrib))

Irish:

- Northern Ireland (United Kingdom) (along with Ulster Scots and English)

Italian:

- part of Croatia
  - Istria county (with Croatian)
- part of Slovenia
  - Izola, Koper and Piran municipalities (with Slovene)

Ivatan:

- Luzon (Philippines) (with Filipino, English, Bikol, Ibanag, Ilocano, Kapampangan, Pangasinan, Sambal, and Tagalog)

Japanese:

- Part of Palau
  - Angaur (with English)

Kabardian:

- Kabardino-Balkaria (state language; with Balkar and Russian)

Kalmyk:

- Kalmykia (state language; with Russian)

Kannada:

- India (with 21 other regional languages)

Kapampangan:

- Luzon (Philippines) (with Filipino, English, Bikol, Ilocano, Ibanag, Ivatan, Pangasinan, Sambal, and Tagalog)

Karachay:

- Karachay–Cherkessia (state language; with Abaza, Cherkess, Nogai and Russian)

Karelian:

- Karelia (authorized language; with Finnish and Veps)

Kashmiri:

- India (with 21 other regional languages)
  - Jammu and Kashmir

Kazakh:

- Republic of Altay (official language; in localities with Kazakh population)
- part of the People's Republic of China
  - Ili, with Chinese (Mandarin)
  - Barkol, with Chinese (Mandarin)
  - Mori, with Chinese (Mandarin)
- part of Mongolia
  - Mori, with Mongolian

Khakas:

- Khakassia (state language; with Russian)

Khanty:

- Khanty–Mansi Autonomous Okrug (aboriginal language; with Mansi and Nenets)
- Yamalo-Nenets Autonomous Okrug (aboriginal language; with Nenets and Selkup)

Kinaray-a:

- Visayas (Philippines) (with Filipino, English, Aklanon, Bikol, Cebuano, Hiligaynon, Surigaonon, Tagalog, and Waray)

Komi:

- Komi (state language; with Russian)

Komi-Permyak:

- Perm Krai
  - Komi-Permyak Okrug (official language)

Korean:

- part of the People's Republic of China with Chinese (Mandarin)
  - Changbai (Jangbaek, Changbaek)
  - Yanbian (Yeonbyeon, Yŏnbyŏn)

Koyukon

- Alaska (with Inupiaq, Siberian Yupik, Central Alaskan Yup'ik, Alutiiq, Unangax̂, Dena'ina, Deg Xinag, Holikachuk, Upper Kuskokwim, Gwich'in, Lower Tanana, Upper Tanana, Tanacross, Hän, Ahtna, Eyak, Tlingit, Haida, Tsimshian, and English)

Kumyk:

- Dagestan (as one of the Dagestan peoples languages; with Russian)

Kyrgyz:

- part of the People's Republic of China
- Kizilsu (with Chinese (Mandarin))

Lak:

- Dagestan (as one of the Dagestan peoples languages; with Russian)

Lezgian:

- Dagestan (as one of the Dagestan peoples languages; with Russian)

Lower Tanana

- Alaska (with Inupiaq, Siberian Yupik, Central Alaskan Yup'ik, Alutiiq, Unangax̂, Dena'ina, Deg Xinag, Holikachuk, Koyukon, Upper Kuskokwim, Gwich'in, Upper Tanana, Tanacross, Hän, Ahtna, Eyak, Tlingit, Haida, Tsimshian, and English)

Macedonian

- part of Albania
- part of Serbia

Maguindanao:

- Mindanao (Philippines) (with Filipino, English, Cebuano, Chavacano, Hiligaynon, Ilocano, Maranao, Surigaonon, Tagalog, Tausug, and Yakan)

Malayalam:

- India (with 21 other regional languages)
  - Kerala
  - Puducherry
  - Lakshadweep

Mansi:

- Khanty–Mansi Autonomous Okrug (aboriginal language; with Khanty and Nenets)

Maranao:

- Mindanao (Philippines) (with Filipino, English, Cebuano, Chavacano, Hiligaynon, Ilocano, Maguindanao, Surigaonon, Tagalog, Tausug, and Yakan)

Marathi:

- India (with 21 other regional languages)
  - Maharashtra
  - Goa
  - Dadra and Nagar Haveli and Daman and Diu

Mari (Hill and Meadow):

- Mari El (state language; with Russian)

Mayan:

- Mexico (*only recognized)
- Guatemala (*only recognized)
- Belize (*only recognized)
- Honduras (*only recognized)
- El Salvador (*only recognized)

Meitei (officially known as Manipuri):

- India (with 21 other official languages)
  - Manipur
  - Tripura (formerly)

Mi'kmaq:

- Nova Scotia ("first language"; with English (de facto), French, Scottish Gaelic)

Moksha:

- Mordovia (state language; with Erzya and Russian)

Mongolian:

- part of the People's Republic of China
  - Inner Mongolia, with Chinese (Mandarin)
  - Haixi, with Tibetan and Chinese (Mandarin)
  - Bortala, with Chinese (Mandarin)
  - Bayin'gholin, with Chinese (Mandarin)
  - Dorbod, with Chinese (Mandarin)
  - Qian Gorlos, with Chinese (Mandarin)
  - Harqin Left, with Chinese (Mandarin)
  - Fuxin, with Chinese (Mandarin)
  - Weichang, with Chinese (Mandarin)
  - Subei, with Chinese (Mandarin)
  - Henan, with Chinese (Mandarin)

Náhuatl:

- Mexico (*only recognized)
- El Salvador (*only recognized)

Nenets:

- Khanty–Mansi Autonomous Okrug (aboriginal language; with Khanty and Mansi)
- Yamalo-Nenets Autonomous Okrug (aboriginal language; with Khanty and Selkup)

Nepali:

- India (with 21 other regional languages)

Nogai:

- Dagestan (as one of the Dagestan peoples languages; with Russian)
- Karachay–Cherkessia (state language; with Abaza, Cherkess, Karachay and Russian)

Occitan:

- Catalonia, with Catalan and Spanish)

Odia:

- India (with 21 other regional languages)
  - Odisha

Ossetic (Digor and Iron dialects):

- North Ossetia—Alania (state language; with Russian)

Pangasinan:

- Luzon (Philippines) (with Filipino, English, Bikol, Ibanag, Ilocano, Ivatan, Kapampangan, Sambal, and Tagalog)

Portuguese:

- part of the People's Republic of China
  - Macau (with Chinese)

Punjabi:

- Pakistan
  - Punjab
- India (with 21 other regional languages)
  - Punjab
  - Delhi

Rapa Nui

- Easter Island (with Spanish)

Romanian:

- Vojvodina (with Croatian, Serbian, Hungarian, Slovak and Ruthenian)

Rotuman

- Rotuma (with English, Fijian, and Fiji Hindi)

Russian. Russian is fixed as a state language in the Constitutions of the republics of the Russian Federation:

- Adygea (state language; with Adyghe)
- Altay, Republic of (state language; with Altay)
- Bashkortostan (state language; with Bashkir)
- Buryatia (state language; with Buryat)
- Chechnya (state language; with Chechen)
- Chuvashia (state language; with Chuvash)
- Dagestan (state language; with the languages of the Dagestan peoples)
- Ingushetia (state language; with Ingush)
- Kabardino-Balkaria (state language; with Balkar and Kabardian)
- Kalmykia (state language; with Kalmyk)
- Karachay–Cherkessia (state language; with Abaza, Cherkess, Karachay and Nogai)
- Karelia (state language)
- Khakassia (state language; with Khakas)
- Komi (state language; with Komi)
- Mari El (state language; with Mari (Hill and Meadow))
- Mordovia (state language; with Erzya and Moksha)
- North Ossetia—Alania (state language; with Ossetic)
- Sakha (state language; with Sakha)
- Tatarstan (state language; with Tatar)
- Tyva (state language; with Tuvan)
- Udmurtia (state language; with Udmurt)
- Russian (with Gagauz) is an official language of Gagauzia (autonomous republic within Moldova)

Rusyn:

- Vojvodina (with Croatian, Serbian, Romanian, Hungarian, Slovak)
- Ukraine
  - Zakarapts'ka region (with Ukrainian, Hungarian)

Rutul:

- Dagestan (as one of the Dagestan peoples languages; with Russian)

Sakha:

- Sakha (state language; with Russian)

Sambal:

- Luzon (Philippines) (with Filipino, English, Bikol, Ibanag, Ilocano, Ivatan, Kapampangan, Pangasinan, and Tagalog)

Sami:

- Finland (in four municipalities)
- Norway (in six municipalities in two provinces)
- Sweden (in four municipalities and surrounding municipalities)

Sanskrit:

- Nepal

Saraiki

- Pakistan

Sarikoli:

- part of the People's Republic of China (It's different from Tajiki of Tajikistan)
  - Taxkorgan (with Chinese (Mandarin))

Selkup:

- Yamalo-Nenets Autonomous Okrug (aboriginal language; with Khanty and Nenets)

Serbian:

- Croatia-Co-official minority language in municipalities: Borovo, Trpinja, Markušica, Negoslavci, Vukovar, Šodolovci, Erdut, Darda, Jagodnjak, Kneževi Vinogradi, Dvor, Gvozd, Biskupija, Ervenik, Kistanje, Gračac, Udbina, Vrbovsko, Donji Kukuruzari and Nijemci.

Siberian Yupik

- Alaska (with Inupiaq, Central Alaskan Yup'ik, Alutiiq, Unangax̂, Dena'ina, Deg Xinag, Holikachuk, Koyukon, Upper Kuskokwim, Gwich'in, Lower Tanana, Upper Tanana, Tanacross, Hän, Ahtna, Eyak, Tlingit, Haida, Tsimshian, and English)

Sindhi:

- India (with 21 other regional languages)
- Pakistan (Official language in the province of Sindh along with Urdu and English)

Sioux:

- United States (South Dakota)

North and South Slavey:

- Northwest Territories (with Cree, Chipewyan, English, French, Gwich'in, Inuinnaqtun, Inuktitut, Inuvialuktun, and Tłįchǫ (Dogrib))

Slovak:

- part of Serbia
  - Vojvodina (with Croatian, Serbian, Hungarian, Romanian and Ruthenian)

Slovene:

- part of Italy
  - Friuli-Venezia Giulia (with Italian, Friulian and German)
- part of Austria
  - Carinthia (with German)

Spanish:

- New Mexico (spoken with English)
- Puerto Rico (with English)
- Philippines (mainly as Chavacano in Mindanao)
- El Cenizo, Texas

Surigaonon:

- Visayas and Mindanao (Philippines) (with Filipino, English, Aklanon, Bikol, Cebuano, Chavacano, Hiligaynon, Ilocano, Kinaray-a, Maguindanao, Maranao, Tagalog, Tausug, Waray, and Yakan)

Tabasaran:

- Dagestan (as one of the Dagestan peoples languages; with Russian)

Tagalog:

- Luzon, Visayas, and Mindanao (Philippines) (with Filipino, English, Aklanon, Bikol, Cebuano, Chavacano, Hiligaynon, Ibanag, Ilocano, Ivatan, Kapampangan, Kinaray-a, Maguindanao, Maranao, Pangasinan, Sambal, Surigaonon, Tausug, Waray, and Yakan)

Tamil:

- India (with 21 other regional languages)
  - Andaman and Nicobar Islands
  - Puducherry
  - Tamil Nadu
- Sri Lanka
- Singapore

Tanacross

- Alaska (with Inupiaq, Siberian Yupik, Central Alaskan Yup'ik, Alutiiq, Unangax̂, Dena'ina, Deg Xinag, Holikachuk, Koyukon, Upper Kuskokwim, Gwich'in, Lower Tanana, Upper Tanana, Hän, Ahtna, Eyak, Tlingit, Haida, Tsimshian, and English)

Tat:

- Dagestan (as one of the Dagestan peoples languages; with Russian)

Tatar:

- Tatarstan (state language; with Russian)

Tausug:

- Mindanao (Philippines) (with Filipino, English, Cebuano, Chavacano, Hiligaynon, Ilocano, Maguindanao, Surigaonon, Tagalog, Maranao, and Yakan)

Telugu:

- India (with 21 other regional languages)
  - Andhra Pradesh
  - Telangana
  - Puducherry
  - Andaman and Nicobar Islands

Tibetan:

- Tibet Autonomous Region (with Chinese (Mandarin))
- Aba (with Chinese (Mandarin))
- Garzê (with Chinese (Mandarin))
- Dêqên (with Chinese (Mandarin))
- Wenshan (with Chinese (Mandarin))
- Gannan (with Chinese (Mandarin))
- Haibai (with Chinese (Mandarin))
- Hainan (with Chinese (Mandarin))
- Huangnan (with Chinese (Mandarin))
- Golog (with Chinese (Mandarin))
- Gyêgu (with Chinese (Mandarin))
- Haixi (with Mongolian and Chinese (Mandarin))
- Muli (with Chinese (Mandarin))
- Tianzhu (with Chinese (Mandarin))

Tłįchǫ:

- Northwest Territories (with Cree, Chipewyan, English, French, Gwich'in, Inuinnaqtun, Inuktitut, Inuvialuktun, North Slavey, and South Slavey)

Tlingit

- Alaska (with Inupiaq, Siberian Yupik, Central Alaskan Yup'ik, Alutiiq, Unangax̂, Dena'ina, Deg Xinag, Holikachuk, Koyukon, Upper Kuskokwim, Gwich'in, Lower Tanana, Upper Tanana, Tanacross, Hän, Ahtna, Eyak, Haida, Tsimshian, and English)

Tsakhur:

- Dagestan (as one of the Dagestan peoples languages; with Russian)

Tsimshian

- Alaska (with Inupiaq, Siberian Yupik, Central Alaskan Yup'ik, Alutiiq, Unangax̂, Dena'ina, Deg Xinag, Holikachuk, Koyukon, Upper Kuskokwim, Gwich'in, Lower Tanana, Upper Tanana, Tanacross, Hän, Ahtna, Eyak, Tlingit, Haida, and English)

Tswana:

- South Africa (with Afrikaans, English, Ndebele, Northern Sotho, Sotho, Swati, Tsonga, Venda, Xhosa, Zulu)

Turkish:

- North Macedonia in Plasnica and Centar Župa
- Kosovo in Prizren and Mamuša
- part of Bulgaria

Tuvan:

- Tyva (state language; with Russian)

Udmurt:

- Udmurtia (state language; with Russian)

Unangax̂

- Alaska (with Inupiaq, Siberian Yupik, Central Alaskan Yup'ik, Alutiiq, Dena'ina, Deg Xinag, Holikachuk, Koyukon, Upper Kuskokwim, Gwich'in, Lower Tanana, Upper Tanana, Tanacross, Hän, Ahtna, Eyak, Tlingit, Haida, Tsimshian, and English)

Upper Kuskokwim

- Alaska (with Inupiaq, Siberian Yupik, Central Alaskan Yup'ik, Alutiiq, Unangax̂, Dena'ina, Deg Xinag, Holikachuk, Koyukon, Gwich'in, Lower Tanana, Upper Tanana, Tanacross, Hän, Ahtna, Eyak, Tlingit, Haida, Tsimshian, and English)

Upper Tanana

- Alaska (with Inupiaq, Siberian Yupik, Central Alaskan Yup'ik, Alutiiq, Unangax̂, Dena'ina, Deg Xinag, Holikachuk, Koyukon, Upper Kuskokwim, Gwich'in, Lower Tanana, Tanacross, Hän, Ahtna, Eyak, Tlingit, Haida, Tsimshian, and English)

Urdu:

- Pakistan (with English as co-official language)
- India (with 21 other regional languages)
  - Jammu and Kashmir
  - Delhi Territory
  - Uttar Pradesh state
  - Bihar state
  - Andhra Pradesh mainly in Hyderabad (former princely state of Nizam) and adjacent areas of Maharashtra and Karnataka

Uyghur:

- Xinjiang (with Chinese (Mandarin))

Veps:

- Karelia (authorized language; with Finnish and Karelian)

Vietnamese:

- Guangxi Province, China (some regional status)
- Part of Cambodia
- Part of Laos

Waray:

- Visayas (Philippines) (with Filipino, English, Aklanon, Cebuano, Hiligaynon, Kinaray-a, and Tagalog)

Welsh:

- Wales (United Kingdom) (with English)

Yakan:

- Mindanao (Philippines) (with Filipino, English, Cebuano, Chavacano, Hiligaynon, Ilocano, Maguindanao, Maranao, Surigaonon, Tagalog, and Tausug)

Yiddish:

- Russia (only in Jewish Autonomous Oblast, with Russian)

Yukaghir:

- Sakha (local official language; in localities with Yukaghir population)

Zhuang:

- Guangxi (with Chinese (Mandarin))
- Lianshan (with Chinese (Mandarin))

== See also ==
- List of official languages of international organizations
- List of official languages by country and territory
- National language

== Notes ==
By ISO 639-3 code
Enter an ISO code to find the corresponding language article.
