= Buduma =

Buduma may refer to:

- Buduma people of Chad, Cameroon, and Nigeria
- Buduma language spoken by that people
