= Wama =

Wama or WAMA may refer to:

- Wama, Kenya, a settlement
- Wama District, in Afghanistan
- Wama, the former German name for Vama, a commune in Suceava county (formerly Bukovina), in northern Romania
- Ricinodendron, known in Ghana as wama, a tree and its oilseed
- Wama language:
  - Akurio language (Surinam)
  - Waama language (Benin)
- WAMA (AM), a radio station of Florida, U.S.
- Walter Anderson Museum of Art, in Ocean Springs, Mississippi, U.S.
- Washington Area Music Association, in Washington, D.C., U.S.

== See also ==
- Waama language
