= Kavsokl Batoka =

Togolese fashion designer

- Born: Kavsokl Batoka; Togo
- Occupation: Fashion designer
- Years active: Early 2000s–present
- Organization: Kav Élite
- Known for: Founder of Kav Élite; dressing African first ladies
- Notable work: Arc-en-ciel collection Gneto lim collection Fraternité collection
- Children: 5

Kavsokl Batoka, also known by the pseudonym Kav Élite, is a Togolese fashion designer who leads the company Kav Élite, which has become her pseudonym. She is recognized as a prominent Togolese fashion artist and dresses several first ladies of the African continent, among others.

Batoka is also involved in charitable works, particularly for Togolese orphans, as she herself is fatherless.

== Biography ==
=== Career ===
The designer lost her father at a very young age. After completing her studies, Batoka studied fashion in Togo for four years and graduated at the top of her class in 1998. She then went to Dakar, Senegal, to further her training.

The artist began her work in the fashion industry in the early 2000s by founding her company, Kav Élite, in Lomé, Togo, which initially had only three apprentices.

In 2022, the designer presented her first "Kav Elite Fashion Show" in Lomé, attended by other Togolese and African fashion figures, such as Desmond Design. This event was an opportunity for her to showcase her "Arc-en-ciel" (Rainbow) collection. Alongside this presentation, Kav Élite organized a fundraiser for charitable works and donations to Togolese orphanages. In 2022, she visited an orphanage to offer food and supplies. Among her clients are several first ladies of the African continent, and she is sometimes nicknamed the "Baroness of Fashion".

Additionally, her creations have been featured on the covers of Ivorian fashion magazines "Life Magazine" and "Brut", and she was invited to the stage at the 9th edition of the International Togolese Fashion Festival. There, she presented her collection "Gneto lim", which means "greenery" in Kabiye, a particularly verdant collection dedicated to environmental protection. The following year, in 2023, Kav Élite presented one of her collections in Abidjan.

In July 2024, she presented her "Fraternité" collection in Brussels and then organized the second session of her "Kav Elite Fashion Show", scheduled to be held from 18 to 21 July 2024, in the Kozah Prefecture, with the aim of integrating disadvantaged populations from northern Togo into fashion creation.

=== Personal life ===
Batoka is married and the mother of five children.
