= Latin gamma =

Latin letter based on the Greek letter gamma

Gamma
- Ɣ ɣ

Usage
- Writing system: Latin script
- Type: Alphabetic and Logographic
- Sound values: [ɣ]
- In Unicode: U+0194, U+0263

Other
- Writing direction: Left-to-Right

Ɣ (minuscule: ɣ), known as Latin gamma, is a Latin-script letter. Its shape, in uppercase and lowercase, is based on the lowercase shape of the Greek letter gamma (γ). Unlike the Greek gamma, the Latin gamma may have serifs.

Latin gamma is used to represent a voiced velar fricative in the alphabets of several African languages such as Yom, Dagbani, Dinka, Kabiyé, and Ewe, some Berber languages using the Berber Latin alphabet, and sometimes in the romanization of Pashto. It is also used in the Wakhi language's Latin alphabet.

Lowercase Latin gamma is used in the International Phonetic Alphabet to represent the voiced velar fricative. A lowercase Latin gamma that lies above the baseline rather than crossing it (ɤ; called "ram's horns") represents the close-mid back unrounded vowel. In certain nonstandard variations of the IPA the uppercase form is used. The lowercase Latin gamma can also be used in contexts (such as chemical or molecule nomenclature) where gamma must not be confused with the letter y, which can occur in some computer typefaces.

== Use on computers ==
Character information
Preview	Ɣ		ɣ		𝼱	
Unicode name	LATIN CAPITAL LETTER GAMMA		LATIN SMALL LETTER GAMMA		LATIN SMALL LETTER GAMMA; WITH PALATAL HOOK	
Encodings	decimal	hex	dec	hex	dec	hex
Unicode	404	U+0194	611	U+0263	122673	U+1DF31
UTF-8	198 148	C6 94	201 163	C9 A3	240 157 188 177	F0 9D BC B1
UTF-16	404	0194	611	0263	55351 57137	D837 DF31
Numeric character reference	&#404;	&#x194;	&#611;	&#x263;	&#122673;	&#x1DF31;
