= Tammari language =

Gur language of Benin and Togo

Tammari
- Ditammari
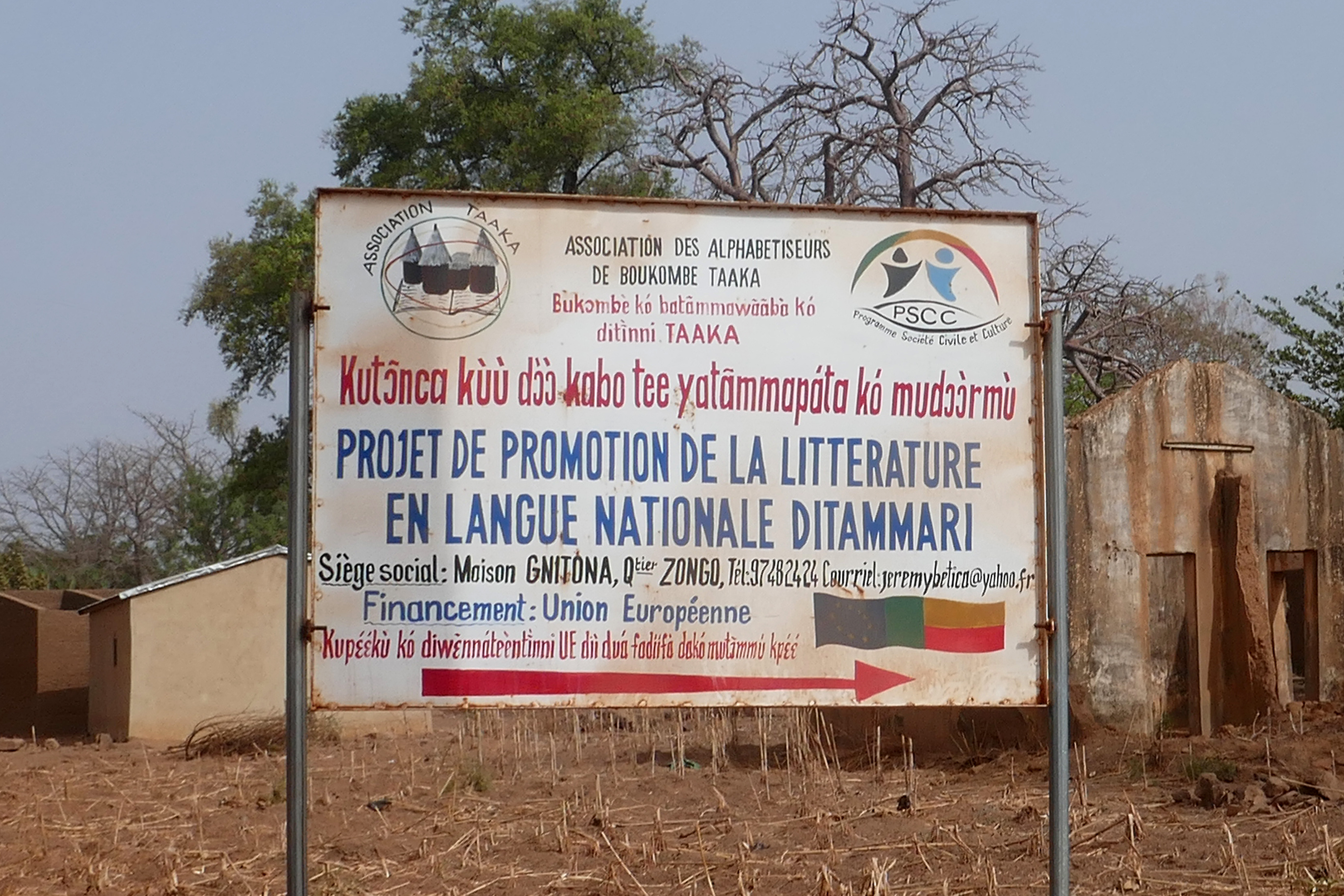
- Sign in Tammari and French
- Native to: Benin, Togo
- Ethnicity: Betammaribe
- Native speakers: 150,000 (2006–2012)
- Language family: Niger–Congo?: Atlantic–Congo; Gur; Northern; Oti–Volta; Eastern (Somba); Tammari

Official status
- Recognised minority language in: Benin

Language codes
- ISO 639-3: tbz
- Glottolog: dita1238

Tammari
- Person: Otammari
- People: Betammaribe
- Language: Ditammari

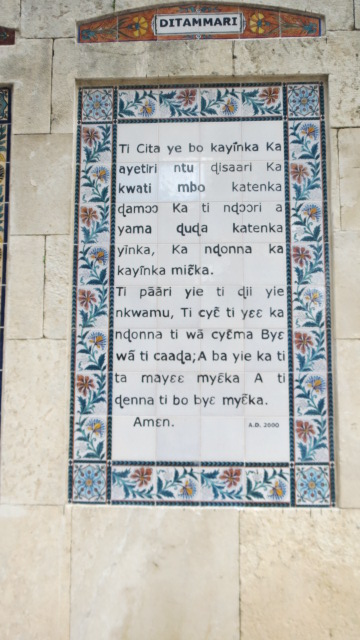
The Lord's Prayer, in Ditammari. Church of the Pater Noster, in Jerusalem.

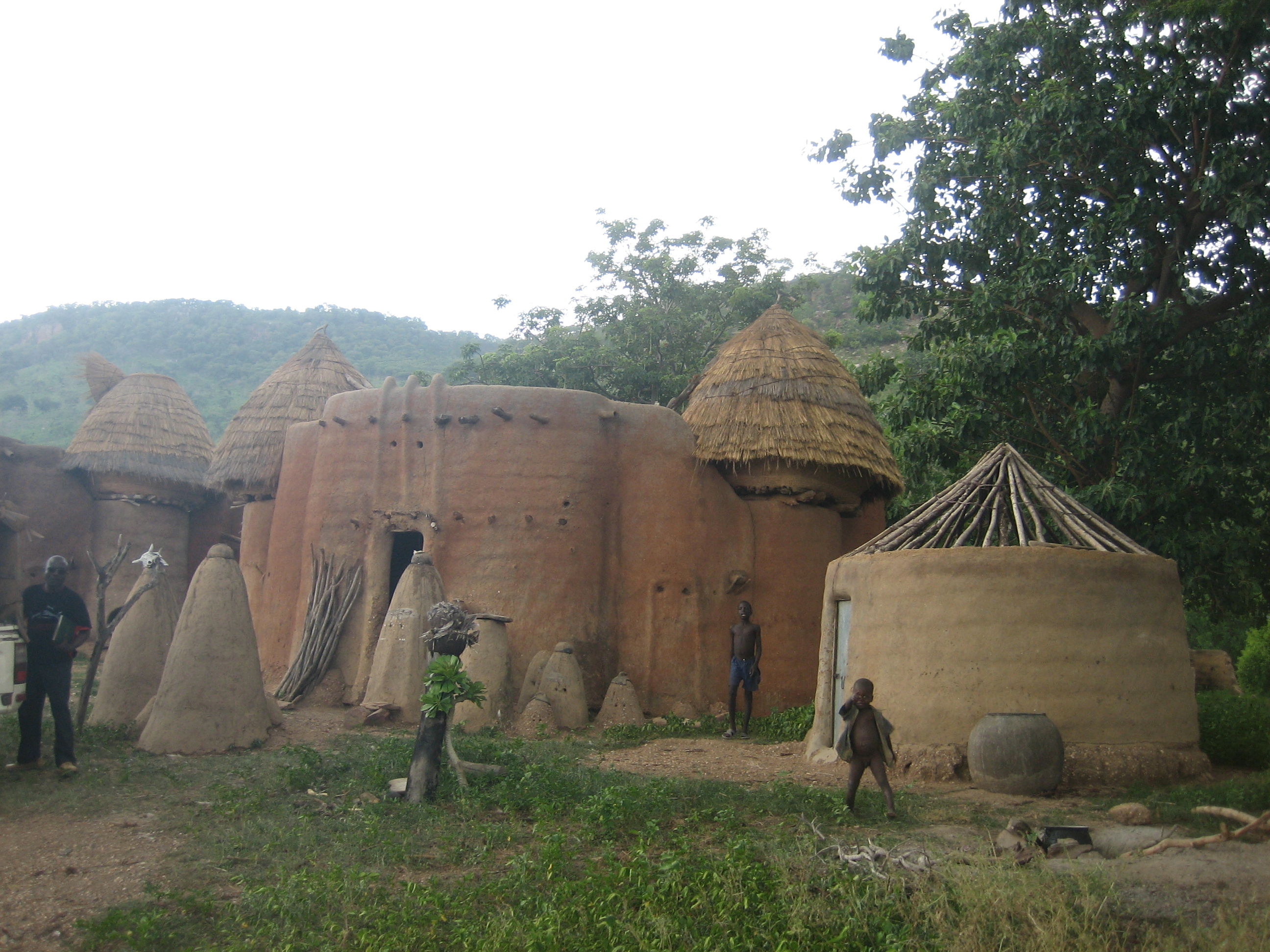
A Tammari house, in Togo

Tammari is a language which is spoken in Benin and Togo. It is also known as Ditammari. The Tammari people, who live in Benin and Togo, mostly speak the language. There are about 47,000 speakers. About half live in Togo, the other half in Benin. Ditammari is one of the Gur languages.

There are two versions of the language, Eastern Ditammari and Western Ditammari. Western Ditamari is also called Tamberma or Taberma.

== Phonology ==
=== Consonants ===
Consonants
		Labial	Alveolar	Palatal	Velar
Plosive	Voiceless	p	t	c	k
Plosive	Voiced	b	d		
Fricative		f	s		ɣ
Nasal	Non-syllabic	m	n		ŋ
Nasal	Syllabic	n̩			
Semivowel		w		j	

- /t/ is [tʰ] before /i/ and /j/, e.g., /tibiiti/ [tʰibiːtʰi] 'the panthers'.
- /d/ is [d] at the beginning of the utterance, of nominal and verbal roots, before /j/ and /w/ and after /n/ and /n̩/. It is [ɾ] at the beginning of the final syllable in some words. Between vowels, it is preferred to [d], except at the beginning of noun and verb roots. For some speakers, it is [ɺ] in variation with [ɾ]. It is in free variation with [d] except after /n/, before /j/ and /w/, and in nominal roots, e.g., /dabide/ [dabiɾe] 'the child'.
- /n/ is [ɲ] at the beginning of a syllable before /j/, at the end of a syllable in the middle of a word before palatal consonants, e.g., /tadanjeete/ [taɾaɲjeːte] 'the partridge'.
- /n̩/ assimilates in place to following labial, palatal, and velar consonants. It also becomes [ŋ̩] before /u/ and /ũ/.
- /ɣ/ is either an aspirated velar continuant or a general aspiration of the following syllable-initial vowel.

=== Vowels ===
Oral vowels
	Front	Central	Back
Close	i		u
Close-mid	e		o
Open-mid	ɛ		ɔ
Open		a	

- /i/ has the free variants [ɪ] and [ɨ] in unstressed syllables. It can also appear as [ʊ] before velars and [ə] between /t/ and /d/.
- /e/ is often [ɛ] at the end of a syllable, except after palatals and /i/.
- /ɛ/ is [æ] in the middle and end of words.
- /a/ has the free variants [ʌ] before stressed syllables and [ɒ] before /kw/.
- /u/ becomes [y] after /j/, except at the end of words and before [u] in the next syllable.

Nasal vowels
	Front	Central	Back
Close	ĩ		ũ
Mid	ɛ̃		ɔ̃
Open		ã	

== Alphabet ==
Alphabet (ABB)
uppercase	A	B	C	D	E	Ɛ	F	H	I	K	Kp
lowercase	a	b	c	d	e	ɛ	f	h	i	k	kp
uppercase	M	N	O	Ɔ	P	R	S	T	U	W	Y
lowercase	m	n	o	ɔ	p	r	s	t	u	w	y

The tones are indicated using the acute accent (high tone) and grave accent (low tone) on the vowel ⟨á é ɛ́ í ó ɔ́ ú à è ɛ̀ ì ò ɔ̀ ù⟩ or the nasal consonant ⟨ḿ ń m̀ ǹ⟩. The nasalization is indicated with the tilde on the vowels ⟨ã ɛ̃ ĩ ɔ̃ ũ⟩. The accent indicating tone can be combined above these vowels.

== See also ==
- Tamprusi language
- Mamprusi language
- Kusasi language
- Gourmanché language
- Berba language
- Bariba language
- Mòoré
- Gurene language
