= Lukpa language =

Gur language spoken in Benin and Togo

Lukpa
- Region: Benin, Togo
- Native speakers: 160,000 (2012–2018)
- Language family: Niger–Congo?: Atlantic–Congo; Gur; Southern; Gurunsi; Eastern; Lukpa

Official status
- Recognised minority language in: Benin

Language codes
- ISO 639-3: dop
- Glottolog: lukp1238

Lukpa (Legba, Logba) is a Gur language spoken in Benin and Togo. It is spoken by the Yoa-Lokpa people.

== Alphabet ==
Lukpa alphabet (Benin)
uppercase	A	C	E	Ɛ	Ǝ	F	H	I	Ɩ	K	Kp	L	M	N	Ny	Ŋ	Ŋm	O	Ɔ	P	Ɣ	S	T	U	Ʊ	W	Y
lowercase	a	c	e	ɛ	ǝ	f	h	i	ɩ	k	kp	l	m	n	ny	ŋ	ŋm	o	ɔ	p	ɣ	s	t	u	ʊ	w	y

== Sources ==
- Centre national de linguistique appliquée (CENALA) (2008), Alphabet des langues nationales béninoises (in French) (6 ed.), Cotonou: CENALA avec le concours de l’Initiative francophone pour la formation à distance des maîtres (IFADEM)
