= IPA extensions =

IPA Extensions may refer to:

- Extensions to the International Phonetic Alphabet, extra symbols for transcribing disordered speech
- IPA Extensions, a Unicode block
