= Yoa-Lokpa people =

Ethnic group in Benin

The Yoa-Lokpa are an ethnic group in Benin. They make up 59% of the population of Donga Department, and approximately 4% of the country's total population. They speak the Yom and Lukpa languages, respectively.

In 2011, approximately 53% of Yoa-Lokpa girls and women were reported to have undergone female genital mutilation.

The Yom language is an Oti–Volta language while the Lukpa language is a Gurunsi language.
