= Buduma people =

Buduma
Yedina

Total population
- 128,800

Regions with significant populations
- Lake Chad
- Chad: 123,000
- Nigeria: 5,300
- Cameroon: 500

Languages
- Yedina

Religion
- Islam

The Buduma are an ethnic group of Chad, Cameroon, and Nigeria who inhabit many of the islands of Lake Chad. They are predominantly fishers and cattle-herders. In the past, the Buduma carried out violent raids on the cattle herds of their neighbors. They were feared villains with aggressive reputations; thus, they were respected and left alone for many years, protected by their own habitat of water and reeds.

Today, they are a peaceful and friendly people willing to adopt some modern changes. Although their neighbors call them Buduma, meaning "people of the grass (or reeds)," they prefer to be called Yedina. Their language is known as Yedina.

== History ==
The Buduma traditionally claim to be descended from the peoples of the Sao civilization and Kanem-Bornu Empire.

The Lake Chad region was integrated into the political realm of the Kanem-Bornu Empire. During this time (specifically around the 9th to 16th centuries), many ethnic groups in the area assimilated or merged in consequence of the new political power in the region. However, some communities stayed distinct and detached from the central government. This included the Buduma who established themselves in the remote islands and northern shores of Lake Chad.

== Culture ==
=== Economy ===
The Buduma are largely fishermen and livestock herders. Some Buduma are engaged in commercial fishing but many fish for personal or familial subsistence. The cattle the Buduma raise are bred to have large and hollow horns. This allows the cattle to float easier when they're transported across the lake or other bodies of water. The Buduma extensively make use of papyrus reeds. The reeds are used for constructing fishing boats, lightweight huts (that can be moved to higher ground if the lake rises), and more. Staples foods of the Buduma include fish, cow milk, water lilly roots (that they grind to flour), and other foods native to the region. Even though they use or consume many products derived from their cattle, the Buduma don't commonly kill and eat them.

=== Clans ===
The Buduma are divided into two large groups which are the Kuri and Buduma. There are further divided into smaller groups though the Guria are the largest among them. Other subgroups include the Mehul, Maibuloa, Budjia, Madjigodjia, Ursawa, Media and Siginda. All these subgroups are also divided into specific lineages and clans.

== Religion ==
The Buduma are Muslims. They were converted by Islamic missionaries during the era of French colonialism in Chad. The Buduma still incorporate many traditional beliefs and practices into their Islamic practices.
