= Yobe language =

Gur language spoken in Benin and Togo

Miyobe
- Soruba
- Miyobe
- Native to: Benin, Togo
- Ethnicity: Biyobe
- Native speakers: (22,000 cited 1991–2012)
- Language family: Niger–Congo?: Atlantic–Congo; ? Gur; Miyobe

Language codes
- ISO 639-3: soy
- Glottolog: miyo1238
- ELP: Miyobe

- People: piyobe
- Language: miyobe

Miyobe or Soruba is an unclassified Niger-Congo language of Benin and Togo.

Güldemann (2018) notes that Miyobe cannot be securely classified within Gur, and leaves it out as unclassified within Niger-Congo. Unlike the Gur languages, which are SVO, Miyobe has SOV word order like the Senufo, Mande, and Dogon languages.

== Geographic distribution ==
In Togo, Miyobe is spoken in the Solla area of Binah Prefecture.

In Benin, Miyobe is spoken in Atacora Department (Boukoumbé and Kouandé communes) and Donga Department (Copargo commune). Villages are Anandana, Kuhobè, Sétrah, Kantchoko (Kapatcharè), Tchomitchomi, Koubéné-Béné, Koutchamang, and Moupémou villages.
