= Foodo language =

Guang language of Benin

Foodo
- Native to: Benin
- Region: Donga
- Native speakers: 21,000 (2018)
- Language family: Niger–Congo?: Atlantic–Congo; Kwa; Potou–Tano; Tano; Guang; North; Foodo

Official status
- Recognised minority language in: Benin

Language codes
- ISO 639-3: fod
- Glottolog: food1238

Foodo (ISO 639-3 fod) is a Guang language spoken in and around the town of Sèmèrè in the north of Benin. There are approximately 37,000 speakers (taking the most recent estimate and adding the estimated 3.2% a year growth rate for Benin). A large proportion of the population live beyond the homeland in other parts of Benin, as well as in neighboring Togo, Nigeria, and Ghana. There may be as many as 1,000 living in Ghana.

The language has its origin in Ghana. Approximately 200 to 300 years ago, a group of Guang speakers migrated from the south of Ghana to Sèmèrè along the ancient cola trade route which extended through Togo and Benin to Nigeria. The various origins of Foodo speakers are still retained in clan names."

== Sociolinguistic background ==
Foodo is one of the national languages of Benin. In the Beninese sociopolitical context 'national language' is interpreted to mean all African languages spoken within the borders of the country.

The Foodo have close historical and cultural links through Islam to the Tem (often known as Kotokoli), in and around the town of Sokode in Togo. Many Foodo are bilingual in Tem as a trade language.

== Phonology ==
=== Consonants ===
Foodo has 24 consonant phonemes. Consonants in parentheses are found only in loan words.

		Bilabial	Alveolar	Palatal	Velar	Labial-velar	Glottal
Stop	voiceless	p p	t t		k k	kp k͡p	
Stop	voiced	b b	d d		g g	gb ɡ͡b	
Fricative	voiceless	f f	s s	c t͡ʃ			h (h)
Fricative	voiced	v (v)	z (z)	j d͡ʒ			
Nasal		m m	n n	ny ɲ	ŋ ŋ	ŋm ŋ͡m	
Approximant			l l r (r)	y j	w w		

=== Vowels ===
Like other Guang languages, Foodo has nine phonemic vowels. Vowel length is contrastive, resulting in a total of 18 vowels.

==== Short vowels ====
	Front		Back	
	Unrounded		Rounded	
	-ATR	+ATR	-ATR	+ATR
Close	ɩ ɪ	i i	ʊ ʊ	u u
Mid	ɛ ɛ	e e	ɔ ɔ	o o
Open	a a			

==== Long vowels ====
	Front		Back	
	Unrounded		Rounded	
	-ATR	+ATR	-ATR	+ATR
Close	ɪː	iː	ʊː	uː
Mid	ɛː	eː	ɔː	oː
Open	aː			

=== Tones ===
Foodo is a tonal language, meaning that pitch differences are used to distinguish one word from another. These contrasts may be lexical or grammatical.

There are two tones, High (H) and Low (L).

Foodo also has automatic downstep, where a H following a L is always pronounced on a lower pitch than the preceding H within the same phonological phrase. Numerous tonal processes occur once words are placed in context.

=== Syllable structure ===
In underlying forms, there are five possible syllable types: CV, CV:, CVV, CVC, V and VC. Except for some pronominal forms, both V and VC are limited to affixes. The only consonants which occur in the coda position are nasals.

=== Vowel harmony ===
Foodo has vowel harmony. All vowels in the stem agree in regard to their ATR quality. Prefixes and most suffixes receive their ATR feature from the ATR quality of the stem. There is also some rounding vowel harmony in nouns, but this is more restrictive and often varies between speakers.

== Orthography ==
The Foodo orthography uses modified Roman script, adding various characters to represent sounds that do not occur in European languages.

=== Tones ===
The Foodo orthography marks an acute accent on the first syllable of the word if that syllable is H tone, and leaves all other syllables unmarked. e.g.á é ɛ́ í ɩ́ ó ɔ́ ú ʊ́

== Grammar ==
=== Noun classes ===
Foodo has ten noun classes. Most nouns consist of a stem with a noun class prefix and a noun class suffix. But it is more helpful to speak of classification being based on agreement patterns rather than just on the form of a single affix. Nouns are grouped into different sets which share common agreement phenomena within the noun phrase and on concordant anaphoric pronouns outside the noun phrase. The tone on noun class prefixes behaves similarly to other Guang languages.

=== Syntax ===
Foodo is an SVO language. Adverbial phrases are generally clause final. The order of morphemes within a verbal word is: subject anaphoric clitic — negative marker — TAM — verb stem — directional].
