= Zimbabwean sign languages =

Deaf sign language of Zimbabwe

Zimbabwe Sign Language
- Zimsign
- Native to: Zimbabwe
- Signers: 73,000 (2021); 280,000 deaf members of the Zimbabwe National Association of the Deaf
- Language family: several Deaf-community sign languages of unknown origin
- Dialects: Masvingo School Sign

Official status
- Official language in: Zimbabwe

Language codes
- ISO 639-3: zib
- Glottolog: zimb1247

Several Zimbabwean sign languages developed independently among deaf students in different Zimbabwean schools for the deaf starting in the 1940s. It is not clear how many languages they are, as little research has been done; Masvingo School Sign is known to be different from that of other schools, but each school apparently has a separate sign language, and these are different from the community language or languages used outside of the schools. "Sign language", without further clarification, became one of Zimbabwe's official national languages with the Constitution of 2013.
