= Mbelime language =

Eastern Oti-Volta Gur language of Benin

Mbelime
- Native to: Benin
- Native speakers: 40,000 (2006)
- Language family: Niger–Congo?: Atlantic–Congo; Gur; Northern; Oti–Volta; Eastern (Somba); Mbelime

Official status
- Recognised minority language in: Benin

Language codes
- ISO 639-3: mql
- Glottolog: mbel1240

Mbelime, or Niende, is an Eastern Oti-Volta Gur language of northwestern Benin. Mbelime is spoken by approximately 131,000 people. There is a Mbelime dictionary.

== Phonology ==
=== Consonants ===
Consonants
		Labial	Apical	Palatal	Velar	Labial- velar	Glottal
Plosive	voiceless	p	t	c	k	k͡p	
Plosive	voiced	b	ɖ				
Nasal		m	n				
Fricative		f	s				
Approximant		w		j			

- /ɖ/ can be realized as [ɖ], [ɭ], or [ɽ] between vowels.
- /k͡p/ tends to be realized as [kw].
- /m/ and /n/ assimilate to following consonants, e.g., [ɳ] before [ɖ] and [ŋ] before [k].

=== Vowels ===
Mbelime has 7 oral vowels and 5 nasal vowels.

Oral vowels
	Front	Central	Back
Close	i		u
Close-mid	e		o
Open-mid	ɛ		ɔ
Open		a	

Nasal vowels
	Front	Central	Back
Close	ĩ		ũ
Open-mid	ɛ̃		ɔ̃
Open		ã	
