= Waci language =

Gbe language of Togo and Benin

Waci, Ouatchi
- Waci gbe
- Native to: Togo, Benin
- Region: Maritime, Mono
- Native speakers: 920,000 (2019–2021)
- Language family: Niger–Congo?: Atlantic–Congo; Volta–Niger; Gbe; Waci, Ouatchi
- Writing system: Latin script

Official status
- Recognised minority language in: Benin

Language codes
- ISO 639-3: wci
- Glottolog: waci1239

Waci is a Gbe language of Togo and Benin. It is part of a dialect continuum which also includes Ewe and Mina also known as Gɛn. It is scattered in an area Capo designates as Ewe speaking.
