= Nateni language =

Language of Benin

Nateni
- Native to: Benin
- Ethnicity: Gurma
- Native speakers: 110,000 (2021)
- Language family: Niger–Congo?: Atlantic–Congo; Gur; Northern; Oti–Volta; Gurma; Nateni

Official status
- Recognised minority language in: Benin

Language codes
- ISO 639-3: ntm
- Glottolog: nate1242

Nateni (Natemba) is a language of the Gurma people spoken in Benin. It is named after its principal dialect; the others are Tayari (Tayaba), Kunteni (Kuntemba), Okoni (Okoma).

== Phonology ==
Consonants
		Labial	Alveolar	Palatal	Velar	Labial–velar	Glottal
Plosive	voiced	b (Note: When preceding nasal vowels, the voiced plosives become nasal consonants: /b/ > [m]; /d/ > [n]; /ɟ/ > [ɲ])	d	ɟ (Note: According to Nédellec & Bukies (2008), the voiced palatal plosive /ɟ/ is disappearing in Nateni. Before oral vowels, it has completely merged to [j], while the nasal realization [ɲ] before nasal vowels is undergoing a similar process, but has not yet completely merged.)			
Plosive	voiceless	p	t	c	k (Note: The voiceless velar plosive /k/ is realized as voiced [ɡ] between vowels (as well as following the syllabic nasal).)	k͡p ⟨kp⟩	
Continuant		f	s	j ⟨y⟩		w	h

Vowels
	Front	Back
Close	i, ĩ ⟨ḭ⟩	u, ũ ⟨ṵ⟩
Close-mid	e	o
Open-mid	ɛ, ɛ̃ ⟨ɛ̰⟩	ɔ, ɔ̃ ⟨ɔ̰⟩
Open	a, ã ⟨a̰⟩	
Syllabic	n̩ (Note: The syllabic nasal only occurs in medial and final positions. Its place of articulation depends on the sounds that follow it: [m] preceding bilabials; [ɱ] preceding labiodentals; [n] preceding alveolars; [ɲ] preceding palatals; [ŋ] preceding velars; It may also be analyzed as a /CV/ cluster with the vowel [ũ], as in [Nũ], where ⟨N⟩ is any realization of the syllabic nasal.) ⟨n⟩	

== Writing system ==
Alphabet
uppercase	A	B	C	D	E	Ɛ	F	H	I	K	Kp	M	N	O	Ɔ	P	S	T	U	W	Y
lowercase	a	b	c	d	e	ɛ	f	h	i	k	kp	m	n	o	ɔ	p	s	t	u	w	y

The low tone is indicated with the grave accent and the high tone with the acute accent on the vowel ⟨à è ɛ̀ ì ò ɔ̀ ù á é ɛ́ í ó ɔ́ ú⟩ or the syllabic n ⟨ǹ ń⟩. The nasalization is indicated with the help of the tilde under the vowel ⟨a̰ ɛ̰ ḭ ɔ̰ ṵ⟩ which can be combined with the acute or grave accent indicating the tone ⟨á̰ ɛ̰́ ḭ́ ɔ̰́ ṵ́ à̰ ɛ̰̀ ḭ̀ ɔ̰̀ ṵ̀⟩.
