= Yedina language =

Chadic language

Yedina
- Buduma, Boudouma
- Yedǝnami
- Native to: Chad, Cameroon, Nigeria
- Ethnicity: Buduma people
- Native speakers: (55,000 cited 1993 census)
- Language family: Afro-Asiatic: Chadic; Biu–Mandara; Yedina
- Dialects: Buduma; Kuri
- Writing system: Arabic (Ajami script); Latin

Language codes
- ISO 639-3: bdm
- Glottolog: budu1265
- ELP: Buduma

Yedina (autonym: Yedǝnami), also known as Buduma or Boudouma, is a Chadic language of the Biu–Mandara branch spoken around Lake Chad in western Chad and neighbouring Cameroon and Nigeria.

200 speakers live in Cameroon, and the rest live in Chad.

== See also ==
- Buduma people
