= Berba language =

Gur language spoken in Benin

Berba
- Bieri
- Biali
- Native to: Benin, Burkina Faso, Togo
- Native speakers: (180,000 cited 1991–2021)
- Language family: Niger–Congo?: Atlantic–Congo; Gur; Northern; Oti–Volta; Eastern (Somba); Berba
- Dialects: Dassari; Gouande; Materi; Pingou; Porga; Tangeta; Tihoun
- Writing system: Latin

Official status
- Recognised minority language in: Benin

Language codes
- ISO 639-3: beh
- Glottolog: bial1238

Berba, also known as Biali, Bieri, Bjeri, Bjerbe or Bialaba, is a Gur language of Benin. There are also a thousand or so speakers in the Kompienga Province of Burkina Faso, where they are believed to have originated in the Savanes Region of Togo.

== Writing system ==
Alphabet
uppercase	A	B	C	D	E	Ə	F	G	H	I	K	L	M	N	O	P	R	S	T	U	W	Y
lowercase	a	b	c	d	e	ə	f	g	h	i	k	l	m	n	o	p	r	s	t	u	w	y

The acute accent on the vowel ⟨á é ə́ í ó ú⟩ is used to indicate high tone when there is ambiguity.
