= Kabiye language =

Eastern Gurunsi language primarily of northern Togo

Kabiye
- kabɩyɛ
- Region: Benin, Ghana, Togo
- Ethnicity: Kabye
- Native speakers: (1.0 million cited 1991–2012)
- Language family: Niger–Congo?: Atlantic–Congo; Volta–Congo languages; Savannas; Gur; Southern; Gurunsi; Eastern; Kabiye
- Writing system: Latin (Kabiye alphabet); Ghanaian braille

Official status
- Recognised minority language in: Benin

Language codes
- ISO 639-3: kbp
- Glottolog: kabi1261

Kabiye ([kàbɪ̀jɛ̀]; also rendered Kabiyé, Kabiyè, Kabye, Kabyé, Kabyè, Cabrai or Cabrais) is an Eastern Gurunsi Gur language spoken primarily in northern Togo. Throughout the 20th century, there was extensive migration to the centre and south of Togo and also to Ghana and Benin. Kabiye speakers made up over 23% of the Togolese population in 1999.

== Status ==
Kabiye is one of two national languages of Togo (along with Ewe). In the Togolese context, national language currently means that the language is promoted in national media and, in the formal education sector, as an optional exam subject in grades 9 and 10.

== Linguistic research ==
The missionary-linguist Jacques Delord published the first descriptive grammar of Kabiye in 1976. This was followed by Kezié Lébikaza's descriptive grammar in 1999, which remains the key reference work in Kabiye linguistics. There is also a Kabiye-French dictionary. Other topics that have been the focus of research include: Comparative linguistics, Discourse analysis, Language contact, Lexicology, Morphology, Phonology, Sociolinguistics, Syntax, Tone orthography, Tonology, and the verb system.

== Publications ==
The earliest known publications in Kabiye appeared in the 1930s. Altogether there have been about 200 publications in Kabiye, though not all of these are still in print or easily available for purchase. For an inventory up to the turn of the century see Pouwili, 1999. Publications include two books of proverbs, folktales, poetry, medical booklets, agricultural booklets, translations of the Bible, political tracts, religious tracts, a short novel, primers, and other pedagogical materials.

=== Kabiye Wikipedia ===
The Kabiye Wikipedia was initiated in June 2014 by Gnasse Atinèdi, the secretary of the Académie Kabiye. It currently (July 2017) has 1185 articles on a wide range of international subjects.

== Phonology ==
=== Consonants ===
		Labial	Alveolar	Retroflex	Palatal	Velar	Labial-velar	Glottal
Stop/ Affricate	voiceless	p	t	ʈ	tʃ	k	k͡p	
Stop/ Affricate	voiced	b	d	(ɖ)	dʒ	ɡ	ɡ͡b	
Fricative	voiceless	f	s					h
Fricative	voiced	v	z					
Approximant			l		j		w	
Nasal		m	n		ɲ	ŋ		

The five voiced consonant sounds /b v dʒ ɡ ɡ͡b/ only occur either word-medially or as allophones.

The retroflex sound /ʈ/ can occur as voiced allophones of [ɖ], [ɽ], or [r] in medial position.

=== Vowels ===
==== Short vowels ====
	Front		Back	
	Unrounded		Rounded	
	−ATR	+ATR	−ATR	+ATR
Close	ɪ	i	ʊ	u
Mid	ɛ	e	ɔ	o
Open	a			

==== Long vowels ====
	Front		Back			
	Unrounded		Rounded		Unrounded	
	−ATR	+ATR	−ATR	+ATR	−ATR	+ATR
Close	ɪː	iː	ʊː	uː	ɯ̙ː	ɯ̘ː
Mid	ɛː	eː	ɔː	oː	ʌː	ɤː
Open	aː				ɑː	

The long back unrounded vowels only occur at morpheme boundaries.

=== Tones ===
Kabiye is a tonal language, meaning that pitch differences are used to distinguish one word from another. These contrasts may be lexical (e.g. ɖálʊ́ "elder brother" ~ ɖálʊ̀ "intestinal worm") or grammatical (e.g. ɛɛkɔŋ́ "he isn't coming" ~ ɛɛ́kɔŋ "(when) he comes" ~ ɛ́ɛkɔ́ŋ "if he doesn't come).

There are two tones, high (H) and low (L). Six tone contours are possible on mono- and disyllabic nouns (H, L, HL, LH, HLH, LHL) and three on the imperative form of the verb (H, L, HL).

Kabiye also has automatic downstep, where a H following a L is always pronounced on a lower pitch than the preceding H within the same phonological phrase. Numerous tonal processes occur once words are placed in context.

The contour HLH always surfaces as HꜜHH ~ HHꜜH (depending on the consonant–vowel structure that it associates to). This is a postlexical process that occurs wherever the context permits, within words and across word boundaries.

There is lexical L tone spreading in the verb phrase and the associative noun phrase.

=== Vowel harmony ===
Kabiye has vowel harmony, meaning that the quality of the vowel in an affix is determined by that of the root vowel. There are two kinds:

1. ATR vowel harmony, in which words contain either the −ATR vowels /ɪ ɛ ʊ ɔ/ (e.g. ɛ-ñɩmɩ́-yɛ "his key") or the +ATR vowels /i e u o/ (e-kalími-yé "his chicken"). The vowel /a/ is unspecified for ATR and can occur in either set.
1. Lip rounding vowel harmony, in which some affixes contains either unrounded vowels /i ɪ e ɛ/ or rounded vowels /u ʊ o ɔ/. This process is much more limited, occurring in some TAM suffixes (e.g. è-kpéz-íɣ́ "he coughs" / è-ɖóz-ùù "he dreams") and some adjectival prefixes (e.g. kɩ́-kpɛ̀d-ʊ̀ʊ́ "black", kʊ́-hʊ̀lʊ̀m-ʊ́ʊ̀ "white"). Again, the vowel /a/ is unspecified for ATR and can occur in either set.

A limited number of prefixes undergo both vowel harmony processes, e.g. the first person plural subject pronoun: pà-kpàzá-à "they coughed", pɛ̀-wɛ̀ɛ́tà-à "they whispered", pè-wèlìsàá "they listened", pɔ̀-cɔ́nà-à "they looked", pò-ɖòzà-á "they dreamt".

== Orthography ==
Kabiye was first written in the 1930s, but it was in the early 1980s that the Comité de Langue Nationale Kabiyè (now the Académie Kabiyè), an organ of the Togolese Ministry of Education, standardized the orthography. Kabiye is written in modified Roman script based on the character inventory of the African reference alphabet. An alternative orthography, devised and promoted by R.P. Adjola Raphaël, is widely used among Catholics; it uses the same letters but with different spelling rules. The following tables show the grapheme-phoneme correspondences in the Standard orthography.

=== Consonants ===
		Labial	Alveolar	Retroflex	Palatal	Velar	Labial-velar	Glottal
Stop	voiceless	P p	T t		C c	K k	KP kp	
Stop	voiced	B b	D d		J j	G g	GB gb	
Fricative	voiceless	F f	S s					H h
Fricative	voiced	V v	Z z					
Approximant			L l		Y y		W w	
Flap			R r	Ɖ ɖ				
Nasal		M m	N n		Ñ ñ	Ŋ ŋ		

The orthography contains a significant amount of overspecification, since the 5 voiced obstruent graphemes b, g, gb, v, j are superfluous from a strictly phonemic point of view.

The grapheme ⟨r⟩ is reserved for loanwords.

=== Vowels ===
==== Short vowels ====
	Front		Back	
	Unrounded		Rounded	
	−ATR	+ATR	−ATR	+ATR
Close	Ɩ ɩ	I i	Ʊ ʊ	U u
Mid	Ɛ ɛ	E e	Ɔ ɔ	O o
Open	A a			

==== Long vowels ====
	Front		Back			
	Unrounded		Rounded		Unrounded	
	-ATR	+ATR	-ATR	+ATR	-ATR	+ATR
Close	ƖƖ ɩɩ	II ii	ƱƱ ʊʊ	UU uu	ƖƔ ɩɣ	IƔ iɣ
Mid	ƐƐ ɛɛ	EE ee	ƆƆ ɔɔ	OO oo	ƐƔ ɛɣ	EƔ eɣ
Open	AA aa				AƔ aɣ	

=== Tones ===
The standard orthography of Kabiye does not generally mark tone. The single exception is the spelling of two subject pronouns that are tonal minimal pairs:

	Speech	Writing	Meaning
3rd person singular	[ɛ̀ ~ è]	ɛ ~ e	"he"
2nd person plural	[ɛ́ ~ é]	ɩ ~ i	"you (pl.)"

=== Punctuation ===
The hyphen is used in the standard orthography in order to distinguish homophones. It appears between the possessive pronoun and the noun in the associative noun phrase, and between the verb root and the object pronoun in the verb phrase, e.g.:

ɛsaŋ	[ɛzáŋ]	he praises
ɛ-saŋ	[ɛzáŋ]	his showers
ɛsa-ŋ	[ɛzáŋ]	he scratched you

== Grammar ==
Kabiye is an SVO language. The possessive precedes the head noun. Adjectives, numerals, demonstratives, locatives and relative clauses follow the head noun.

=== Noun classes ===
Kabiye has ten noun classes. The first eight are grouped in pairs of singulars and plurals that are sometimes referred to as genders. Some limited cross-pairing occurs. Class 9 contains uncountables (leaves, dust, mosquitos...), while class 10 contains liquids (milk, blood, oil...). There are certain other semantic tendencies (e.g., humans in classes 1 and 2, tools in classes 3 and 4), but these are by no means systematic. The class of any noun is identifiable by its class suffix and by the agreement of other potential elements in the sentence with it, such as pronouns, demonstratives, interrogatives, adjectives, determiners and the numerals one to five. The following table gives an example of a noun–determiner construction from each class. In each case, the class suffix is separated from the root with a hyphen:

class	example	translation
1	hàl-ʊ́ nɔ̀ɔ́yʊ̀	"a certain woman"
2	hàl-áà nàbɛ̀yɛ̀	"certain women"
3	hàk-ʊ́ nàkʊ́yʊ̀	"a certain hoe"
4	hàk-ɩ́ŋ̀ nɩ̀ɩ́yɛ̀	"certain hoes"
5	sùmɑ̀-ɑ́ nàkɛ́yɛ̀	"a certain bird"
6	sùmá-sɩ̀ nàsɩ́yɛ̀	"certain birds"
7	hɩ́-ɖɛ̀ nàɖɩ́yɛ̀	"a certain name"
8	hɩ̀-lá nàáyɛ̀	"certain names"
9	há-tʊ̀ nàtʊ́yʊ̀	"certain leaves"
10	càlɩ́-m̀ nàbʊ́yʊ̀	"certain blood"

=== Verb conjugations ===
The verb phrase is composed of an obligatory root and TAM (tense–aspect–mood) suffix. The TAM suffix may indicate imperative (hàzɩ̀ "sweep!"), aorist (ɛ́házɩ̀ "and he swept"), perfective (ɛ̀hàzàá "he swept"), imperfective present (ɛ̀házɩ̀ɣ̀ "he is sweeping"), imperfective past (ɛ̀hàzàɣ́ "he was sweeping") or infinitive (hàzʊ́ʊ̀ "to sweep").

Kabiye is unusual in also having two designated paradigms for expressing comparatives in a subordinate clause: an imperfective form (ɛ̀zɩ́ ɛ̀hàzʊ̀ʊ̀ʊ́ yɔ́ "as he sweeps") and a perfective form (ɛ̀zɩ́ ɛ̀hàzʊ́ʊ̀ yɔ́ "as he swept").

The perfective has two forms: unbound (not followed by a complement: ɛ̀hàzàá "he swept") and bound (followed by a complement: ɛ̀hàzá ɖèdè "he swept yesterday").

The verb phrase may also optionally include modal prefixes that add nuances of meaning: adversative (ɛ̀tɩ́ɩ̀hàzɩ̀ɣ́ "he swept in spite of it"), habitual (ɛ̀tɩ́ɩ́házɩ̀ɣ̀ "he usually sweeps"), expectative (ɛ̀tɩ́ɩ́házɩ́ɣ́ "he sweeps in the meantime"), immediative (ɛ̀tɩ̀hàzàá "he swept straightaway"), pluperfect (ɛ̀ɛ̀hàzàá "he had swept"), future (ɛ̀ɛ́hàzɩ̀ɣ̀ lɛ́ "when he will sweep") and negative (ɛ̀tàhàzɩ́ "he didn't sweep"). Some of these modal prefixes may also appear in combination with each other so that, for example, negative + adversative indicates a negative categorical meaning (ɛ̀tàtɩ́ɩ̀hàzɩ́ "he didn't sweep at all").

The verb phrase may optionally add a subject pronoun prefix (written joined to the root or the modal prefix as in the examples above) and/or an object pronoun suffix (written joined to the root with a hyphen: ɛ̀hàzá-kɛ́ "he swept it").

There is one modal suffix. It is used in conjunction with a negative modal prefix to indicate a Provisional meaning. It is written joined to the verb root (ɛ̀tàhàzɩ̀tá "he has not swept yet").

The verb phrase can also be extended by means of the suffix -náʊ̀ to indicate instrumentality, accompaniment, manner, simultaneity or conformity (ɛ̀hàzɩ́nàà "he swept with").

All verb roots can be nominalised as agentives (házɩ́yʊ́ "sweeper"), adjectives ("kɪ̀hàzʊ̀ʊ́" "swept") or locatives (ɖɩ̀hàzɩ̀yɛ́ "sweeping place").

=== Sample text ===
Man-kabɩyɛ kʊnʊŋ, ŋɖewa pɩfɛyɩ naʊ. Yee pɔyɔɔdʊʊ-ŋ nɛ ɛyʊ welesi yɔ, pɩwɛ-ɩ ɛzɩ wondu peteɣ. Ɛlɛ, yee ɛyʊ ɛwɛɛ nɛ ɛɛmaɣzɩɣ ñɔ-yɔɔ camɩyɛ yɔ, ɛɛnaɣ ñe-ɖeu. Nɔɔyʊ ewelesiɣ pɩŋŋ nɛ ɛnɩɩ pɔyɔɔdʊʊ-ŋ yɔ, pɩlakɩ-ɩ ɛzɩ ɛtazɩ nɛ ɛna ñɛ-wɛtʊ yɔ, pɩɩsaŋɩ-ɩ se eyele. Ŋwɛ yuŋ weyi nɛ ɛyʊ ɛɛtɛŋ ñɔ-tɔm yɔ, pɩtɩna nɛ ɛyʊ ɛɖɔkɩ-ŋ pɩfɛyɩ yebu; Ñɛ-wɛtʊ lɩnɩ le nɛ paasɩŋ ñɔ-tɔm ? Tɔm kɔpɔzaɣ ŋga ɖicosuu-kɛ tobi. Ñɛ-wɛtʊ nɛ tɩ-tɩ solo, mbʊ pʊyɔɔ yɔ ɖooo ŋŋwɛɛ, natʊyʊ taasoki ña-taa se tɩpɩsɩ-ŋ nɔɔyʊjaʊ. Kabɩyɛ kʊnʊŋ, ña-pɩɣa canɩɣna-ŋ nɛ kewiliɣ-ŋ, nɛ kasaŋ-ŋ ño-yuŋ, ñe-ɖeu nɛ ñe-leleŋ yɔɔ.

mankabɪjɛ kʊnʊŋ, ŋɖewa pɪfɛjɪ naʊ. jeː pɔjɔːdʊːŋ nɛ ɛjʊ welesi jɔ, pɪwɛɪ ɛzɪ wondu petɤː. ɛlɛ, jeː ɛjʊ ɛwɛː nɛ ɛmɑːzɯ̙ː ɲɔjɔ tʃamɪjɛ jɔ, ɛːnɑː ɲeɖeu. nɔːjʊ ewelesɯ̘ː pɪŋː nɛ ɛnɪː pɔjɔːdʊːŋ jɔ, pɪlakɪː ɛzɪ ɛtazɪ nɛ ɛna ɲɛwɛtʊ jɔ, pɪːsaŋɪː se ejele. ŋwɛ juŋ weji nɛ ɛjʊ ɛːtɛŋ ɲɔtɔm jɔ, pɪtɪna nɛ ɛjʊ ɛɖɔkɪŋ pɪfɛjɪ jebu; ɲɛwɛtʊ lɪnɪ le nɛ paːsɪŋ ɲɔtɔm? tɔm kɔpɔzɑː ŋga ɖitʃosuːkɛ tobi. ɲɛwɛtʊ nɛ tɪtɪ solo, mbʊ pʊjɔː jɔ ɖo.oː ŋːwɛː, natʊjʊ taːsoki ɲataː se tɪpɪsɪŋ nɔːjʊdʒaʊ. kabɪjɛ kʊnʊŋ, ɲapɯ̙ːa tʃanɯ̙ːnaŋ nɛ kɛwilɯ̘ːŋ, nɛ kasaŋː ɲojuŋ, ɲeɖeu nɛ ɲeleleŋ jɔː.

"My Kabiye language, you are so beautiful! When anyone pronounces you and another listens, you are like a song. But anyone who does not ponder you deeply will not perceive your beauty. Anyone who listens attentively when you are being spoken must, as it were, dig deeply to discover your character. It is because of this inexhaustible weightiness that we cannot let go of you. From where does this impenetrable character come? We can reply straight away to this question. Your character is unique, because ever since you came into being, you have never suffered any outside influences which could turn you into something else. Kabiye language, your child is glad for you, cherishes and praises you, because of your strength, your beauty and your sweetness.
