= Yom language =

Gur language spoken in Benin

Yom
- Pila
- Native to: Benin
- Region: Donga,
- Ethnicity: 70,000 Tamba people, 230,000 Yowa people.
- speakers: L1: 300,000 (2021); L2: 150,000 (2021); No monolinguals speakers
- Language family: Niger–Congo?: Atlantic–Congo; Gur; Northern; Oti–Volta; Yom–Nawdm; Yom
- Dialects: Tangerem; Yom
- Writing system: Latin

Official status
- Recognised minority language in: Benin

Language codes
- ISO 639-3: pil
- Glottolog: yomm1242

Yom, or Pilapila, and formerly Kiliŋa or Kilir, is a Gur language of Benin. It is spoken in the town of Djougou and the surrounding area by the Yoa-Lokpa people. A very closely related dialect called taŋgələm is also spoken by the Taneka people.

== Phonology ==
Where it differs from the IPA symbol, the conventional orthography is given below the phoneme.

=== Vowels ===
In Yom orthography, long vowels are written as double vowels, e.g. ⟨ɛɛ⟩ for /ɛː/.

	Front	Back	Non-front, non-back
High	i, iː	u, uː	ʊ, ʊː
Mid	e, eː	o, oː	ə
Low	ɛ, ɛː	ɔ, ɔː	a, aː

=== Consonants ===
	Bilabial	Labiodental	Alveolar	Post-alveolar	Palatal	Velar	Uvular	Labial-velar
Stop	p b		t d			k ɡ		k͡p ɡ͡b
Nasal	m		n		ɲ ⟨ny⟩	ŋ		ŋ͡m
Affricate				t͡ʃ d͡ʒ ⟨c⟩ ⟨j⟩				
Fricative		f v	s z				ʁ ⟨q⟩	
Lateral			l					
Approximant					j ⟨y⟩			w

^1 Generally, /l/ is realised by [ɾ] in medial and final position. For some speakers, the two allophones are in free variation.

Previously ⟨ʋ⟩ was used instead of ⟨ʊ⟩.

== Grammar ==
=== Genders ===
Nouns are divided into genders or noun classes which can be distinguished by the pronoun used to refer to them and by their suffix, which generally bears some resemblance to the pronoun. If the noun is modified by adjectives, then the suffix appears on the adjectives and not on the noun. The table gives the singular and plural forms of the pronouns used to refer to a noun of each gender. There are also some nouns which have the pronoun də or bə without having a plural form.

Gender	Includes
mə	Mass nouns, liquids and languages
a / ba	Most nouns referring to people, kinship terms, personal names, some abstract nouns and borrowings
ka / sə	Various nouns, diminutives
kʊ / i	Various nouns, augmentatives, territories
ŋʊ / i	Long and slender objects
bə / i	A small class of semantically diverse nouns
də / a	Body parts, material culture, some animals and foods
kʊ / də	Tree and plant terms
də / ba	A small class of marginal cultural items
nə	Only two nouns: dɛn (today) and nən (location)

=== Word order ===
Yom is predominantly an SVO language, although SOV word order is also possible. Genitives precede nouns and relative clauses follow. Adjectives, numerals and demonstratives follow the noun in that order and agree with it in number and gender. Many different constituents can preposed to the beginning of the sentence using a focus construction - for example:

- ma ji ma maŋgoŋʊ, "I am eating my mango"
- ma maŋgoŋʊ ra ma ji ra, "It's my mango that I'm eating"
