= Waama language =

Gur language spoken in Benin

Waama
- Yoabu
- Native to: Benin
- Native speakers: (50,000 cited 2000)
- Language family: Niger–Congo?: Atlantic–Congo; Gur; Northern; Oti–Volta; Eastern (Somba); Waama

Official status
- Recognised minority language in: Benin

Language codes
- ISO 639-3: wwa
- Glottolog: waam1244

Waama, or Yoabu, is a Gur language of Benin.

== Phonology ==
Waama consonants
	Bilabial	Labiodental	Alveolar	Palatal	Velar	Labiovelar
Plosive	p b		t d	c	k	
Nasal	m		n			
Fricative		f	s			
Approximant				j		w

Waama vowels
	Front	Back
Close	i	u
Close-mid	e	o
Open-mid	ɛ	ɔ
Open	a	

Waama distinguishes between short and long versions of all vowels. /i/, /ɛ/, and /ɔ/ also distinguish nasality.

There are two tones: low and high.
