= Agriculture in Benin =

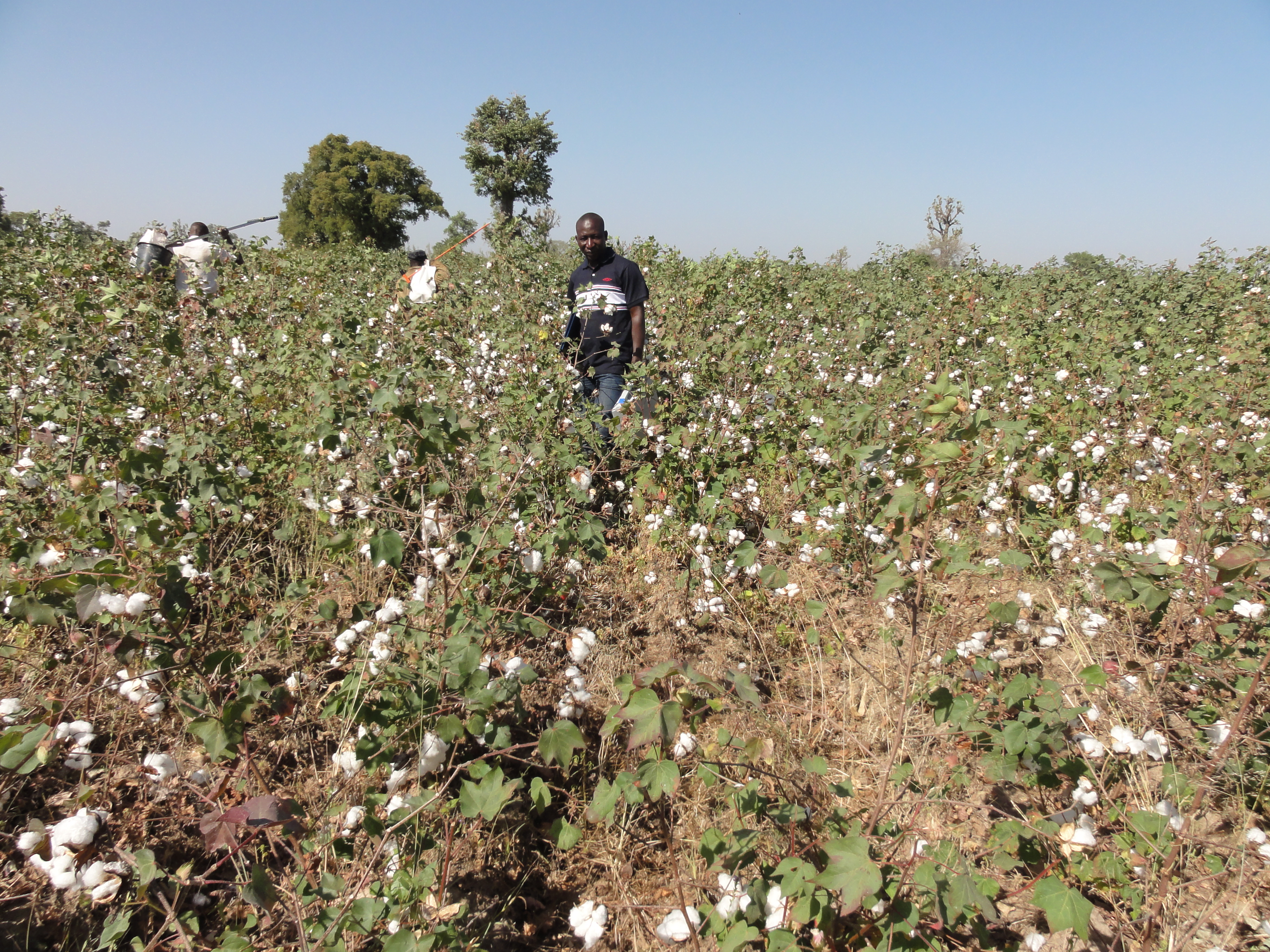
Cotton cultivation in Benin

Benin is predominantly a rural society, and agriculture in Benin supports more than 70% of the population. Agriculture contributes around 25.4% of the country's gross domestic product (GDP) and 80% of export income. While the Government of Benin (GOB) aims to diversify its agricultural production, Benin remains underdeveloped, and its economy is underpinned by subsistence agriculture. Approximately 93% of total agricultural production goes into food production. The proportion of the population living in poverty is about 35.2%, with more rural households in poverty (38.4%) than urban households (29.8%). 36% of households depend solely upon agricultural (crop) production for income, and another 30% depend on crop production, livestock, or fishing for income.

Cotton is the principal cash crop and accounts for 70% of export earnings. Cotton is mostly exported as bales with only 3% of total production processed locally, making the country heavily dependent on world cotton prices. Cashews, shea nuts and shea butter, pineapples, palm products, and some cocoa and coffee also are export crops. Animal and meat exports to nearby countries contribute a significant amount to the agricultural economy, but remains mostly outside official recorded statistics. Corn, beans, rice, peanuts, cashews, pineapples, cassava, yams, other tubers, and vegetables and fruits are grown for local subsistence and for export to neighboring countries through informal cross-border trading activities. Top commodities produced by quantity are cassava, yams, corn, pineapples, tomatoes, rice, cottonseed, cashew nuts, fresh fruit, and groundnuts. Top commodities produced by value are yams, cassava, cotton lint, cashew nuts, pineapples, corn, tomatoes, cattle, hot peppers, and rice.

Since 2008 the GOB has been actively involved in strengthening agricultural development and the staple crop value chains. Benin is a party to commitments made by the heads of government at the various world summits on food and nutrition, including the Millennium Summit. As of 2014, improving agricultural productivity and strengthening diversification were on the top of President Boni Yayi's agenda for agricultural development and overall poverty reduction strategy. The country's long-term vision is to move towards greater diversification in order to become a major exporter of agricultural products by 2025.

To start, the GOB has focused on corn and rice to promote food security and food self-sufficiency. Coarse grains (corn, sorghum, millet) and rice are mostly grown by independent small-scale farmers, who are responsible for producing 90% of the total output while using between 7% and 10% of the total arable land available. Many of the farmers that grow cotton or corn do so on only 1 hectare (2.5 acres), with the largest single farm only reaching up to 18 hectares (44 acres) of land. Current national actions are still very weak, and national plans for food security are mostly focused on staple food (calories) production and addressing nutrient deficiencies by supplementation (vitamin A & iron), food fortification, and salt iodization.

While the GOB aims to diversify its agricultural production, Benin remains underdeveloped and dependent upon the world price for cotton and regional trade. Agriculture policy is set and implemented or influenced by a number of ministries, including the Ministry of Agriculture, Livestock Breeding, and Fishing (Ministère de l'Agriculture, de l'Elevage, et de la Pêche), Ministry of Industry and Trade, Ministry of Economy and Finances, and the Ministry of Transport and Public Works. Extension services are provided at the department level through the CerPA (Regional Center for Agriculture Promotion, Centre Régional pour la Promotion Agricole). Research is carried out at the National Institute of Agriculture Research (Institut National des Recherches Agricoles du Bénin; INRAB) and the International Institute of Tropical Agriculture (IITA). Partners working with the GOB to improve the agricultural sector include the United Nations Development Programme, the World Bank, the United Nations Food and Agriculture Organization, the United Nations Industrial Development Organization (UNIDO), SNV Benin, the European Union, the Corporation for International Cooperation (GIZ), French Development Agency (AFD), and many non-governmental organizations (NGOs) and initiatives.

== Production ==
Benin produced in 2018:

- 3.8 million tons of cassava (17th largest producer in the world);
- 2.7 million tons of yam (4th largest producer in the world, losing only to Nigeria, Ghana and Ivory Coast);
- 1.5 million tons of maize;
- 758 thousand tons of cotton (12th largest producer in the world);
- 598 thousand tons of palm oil;
- 459 thousand tons of rice;
- 372 thousand tons of pineapple;
- 319 thousand tons of sorghum;
- 253 thousand tons of tomato;
- 225 thousand tons of peanut;
- 221 thousand tons of soya;
- 215 thousand tons of cashew nuts (5th largest producer in the world, losing only to Vietnam, India, Ivory Coast and Philippines);

In addition to smaller productions of other agricultural products, like sheanut (13 thousand tons), orange (15 thousand tons) and coconut (17 thousand tons).

== Food security ==
Benin is one of Africa's most stable democracies but the country is challenged by multiple economic and development factors, and the country ranks 163 out of 189 countries on the 2019 Human Development Index. Economic growth is largely dependent upon agriculture, and fluctuations in the volume of rainfall, the high cost of agricultural inputs, and the low level of mechanization impact the country's food security.

The World Food Program reviewed Benin's situation in 2014 and determined that 23% of households in Benin have limited food security and another 11% suffer severe to moderately bad food insecurity. Only 55% are considered food secure. Among the departments Couffo, Mono, and Atacora are the most food insecure departments, with 29%, 28%, and 25% of their households, respectively, considered food insecure. Within these departments there are pockets where food insecurity is experienced by 35-40% of all households. These same three departments also lead in the percentage of households experiencing the slightly improved situation of limited food security, Mono 49%, Atacora 48%, Couffo 47%, Borgou 34%, Collines 27%, and Donga 25%. Of these departments, Atacora, Donga, and Mono suffer the weakest diversity of diet. This is a seasonal problem in many locations, exacerbated by a lack of income. Anecdotal discussions with Peace Corps volunteers stationed in the Peonga area in Oueme Department indicated that absolute food scarcity is not a common problem, but that the lack of diversity in diets, especially during the hungry seasons just before harvests, brought a lack of micronutrients and insufficient nutritional benefits from the available foods. Heavy reliance upon staple crops for starches was common as well, with sauces important to the daily diet, vegetables, vegetable oils, and sugar next in importance, and animal proteins less a common ingredient in the daily meals.

Most food insecure households consume primarily cereals and tubers, with legumes and vegetable oil. Slightly better off households introduce animal proteins and sugar into their diets when they can afford to do so. There are varying levels of household wealth among the departments, here listed from wealthiest to poorest: Littoral, Ouémé, Atlantique, Mono, Zou, Plateau, Donga, Collines, Borgou, Couffo, Alibori, Atacora. More than 85% of households obtain most of their food in local markets, as opposed to being self-sufficient. Most of these households grow crops for consumption, but rely upon the market for diversity and during the famine times.

== Regional and international agribusiness and trade ==
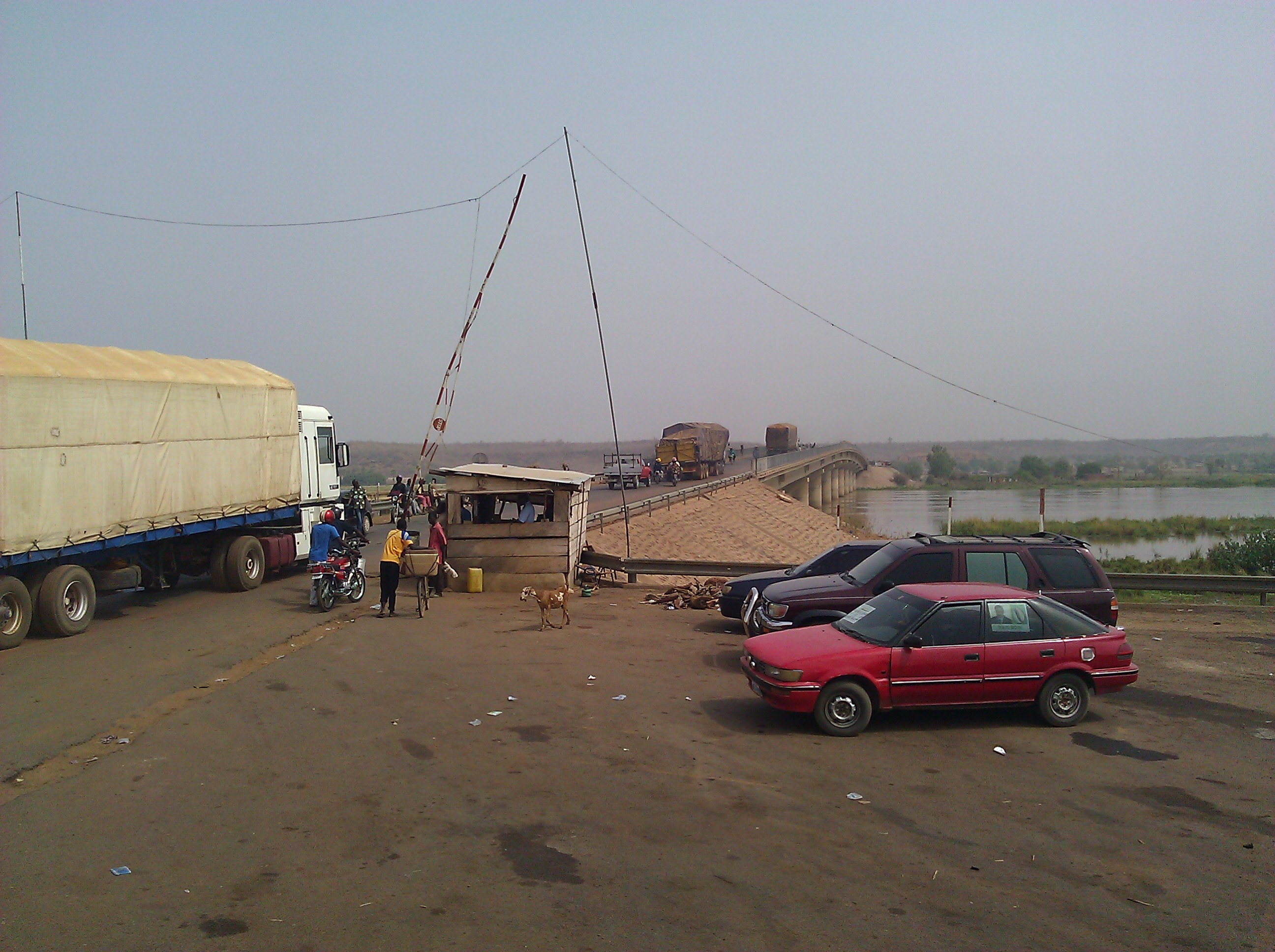
Border crossing between Benin and Niger

Benin serves as a delivery corridor for West Africa reaching more than 100 million people in the landlocked countries of Niger, Mali, Burkina Faso, Chad, and the northern states of Nigeria. Goods landed in Cotonou get placed on trucks first heading north to the border towns of Malanville in Benin and Gaya in Niger and then onto the rest of the Sahel. Parakou is the major crossroad town in Benin, where goods going west to Togo, Ghana, and Burkina Faso pass, and goods going into Nigeria transit before heading to various border crossings. The Sèmè/Kraké border crossing with Nigeria along the coastal road is a major trade nexus for many of the agricultural products imported into Benin.

Benin's traditional trade links with the European Union, in particular France and Belgium, remain strong. There is presence of Chinese foodstuffs in the open-air markets and supermarkets. Benin's major trade partners include Nigeria, France, Belgium, Spain, Switzerland, Argentina, Brazil, the United States, China, and the United Arab Emirates.

The major regional trading partners include Niger, Togo, Nigeria, and Burkina Faso. Estimates of annual trade with these countries are extremely hard to determine, but some sources indicate that as of 2014 Benin exported about 15,000 tons (Note: All "ton" or "t" figures in this article are given in metric tons. One metric ton is equivalent to approximately 2,204.6 pounds, 1.102 short tons (US), or 0.984 long tons (UK).) of corn and 1,500 tons of rice to Nigeria, 6,000 tons of corn to Niger, 1,400 tons of corn and 2,000 tons of rice to Togo. Vegetables and animals move across these borders in large amounts in regular patterns. In “crisis years” where local crops are underproduced, Benin has sourced as much as 9,500 tons of corn and 950 tons of rice from Togo, and 6,000 tons of rice and 1,800 tons of corn from Nigeria. Nigeria's 170 million people and the country's income from oil also influence the economy of Benin significantly. Informal trade between Nigeria and Benin is substantial. Importers take advantage of Nigeria's high tariff changes and porous borders to export unrecorded rice, poultry products and other food and agricultural products to Nigeria. Trade sources estimate that more than 85% of these types of products that are shipped to Benin are meant for onward sales into Nigeria through informal cross-border trading activities. While Nigerian brokers can travel up to farms in Benin to buy vegetables, local buyers often transport their fruits, mostly pineapple and oranges, to markets on the Benin-Nigeria border. The Sèmè/Kraké border market is the best known market of the country for pineapple and orange transactions, where Nigerian brokers load up vehicles bound for Nigeria. This border crossing is also where the majority of other imported agricultural products leave Benin for Nigeria, including palm oil, rice, refined sugar, and poultry meat. According to border-based sources, Kalalè, Caldel, and Onazal in Benin are the three major border towns for the routes of cross-border trade with Nigeria. However, women carrying baskets filled with yams and other items regularly pass over the border at Chikandou in central Benin heading to the Nigerian town of Tchikanda.

== Production ==
=== Commercial crops ===
==== Cotton ====
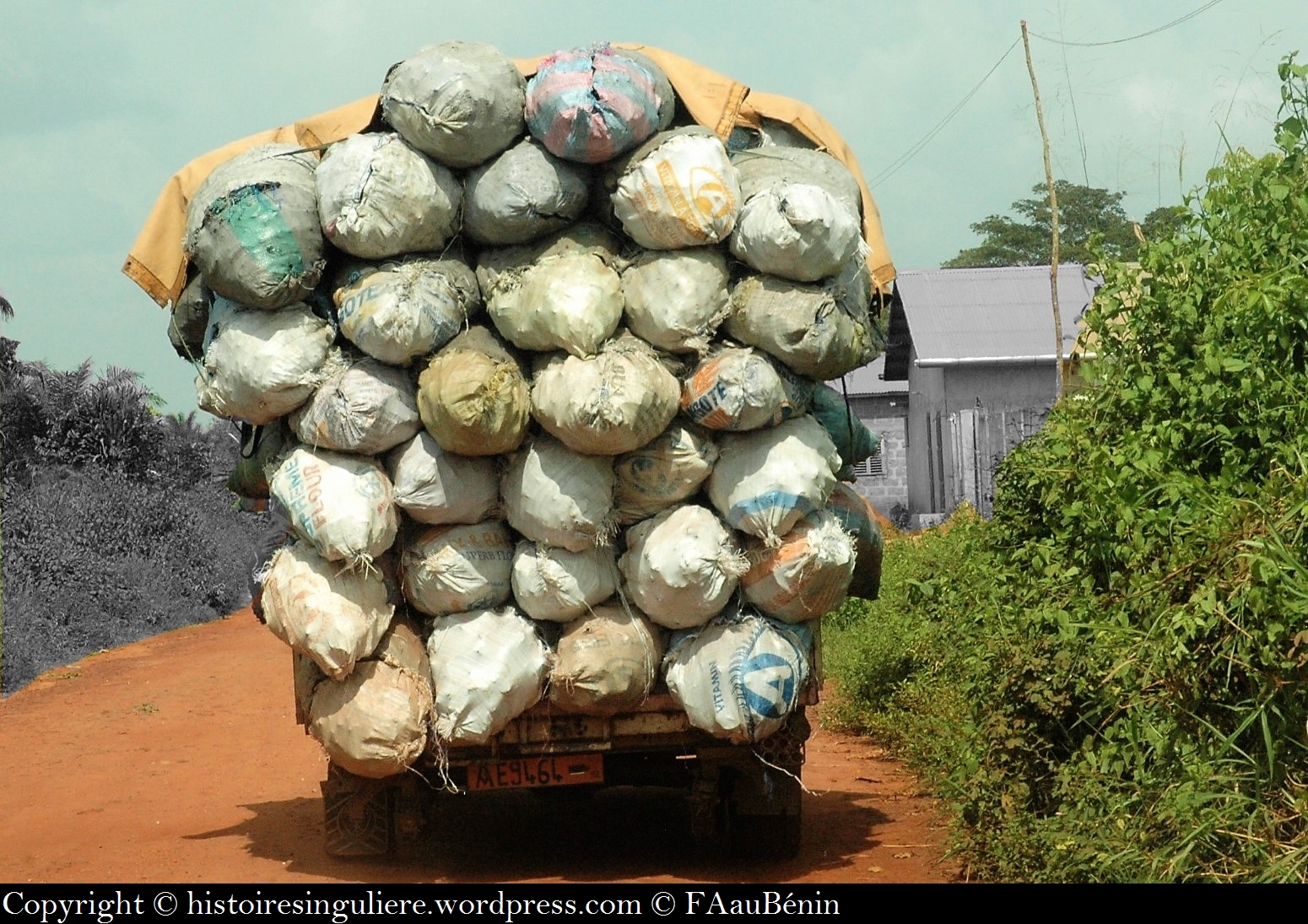
Transportation of cotton in Benin

Cotton accounted for nearly 40% of GDP and roughly 80% of official export receipts as of 2014, and so cotton exports are vital to Benin's economy and an integral part of the country's development plans and poverty reduction strategies. Cotton seed production is concentrated in the north and center of Benin in an area known as the cotton belt. About two thirds of the farmers of Borgou department grow cotton, 37% of those in Atacora department and 64% of those in the central department of Zou. By contrast, in the three departments in the south (Atlantique, Mono, and Ouémé), the percentage ranges from zero to 25%. Cotton is grown by small-scale farmers and sold to ginning companies, which transform it into cotton lint and/or produce other by products such as cotton seed, cake, and oil.

After rising to become one of the 20 leading global producers of cotton lint between 2004 and 2006, Benin experienced a sharp fall in production and exports in the early to mid-2000s. For example, 2010/2011 production was less than one third of the installed ginning capacity of 620,000 tons. Likewise, production of cotton lint was less than half of the level recorded in 2004/2005. Cotton production forecasts are often missed because of unpredictable weather (rains).

Until June 2012, the Association Interprofessionel du Cotton (AIC) was responsible for coordinating marketing of inputs and seed cotton, facilitating financial and economic claims among the key stakeholders, and was the main importer and distributor of cotton insecticides. However, in mid-2013 the GOB removed AIC from its critical role and established a new sector framework, Cadre Institutionnel Transitoire de Gestion de la Filiere Cotton, to set guidelines for a new management framework to revive the cotton industry, including defining new terms for public-private partnerships.

The GOB's attempt to revitalize the cotton sector included making sure that producers/farmers are fully paid for the previous year's crop, consolidating farmer's organizations, creating village cooperatives, providing capacity building to small producers, and fortifying input committees. The GOB also inserted itself into the processing of cotton fibers, by paying ginners a fixed fee of 50 CFA per kilogram for processing (ginners wanted twice that amount—they previously handled all exports), and took over the export of cotton and cotton seeds. This disrupted normal practices within the ginning industry.

Benin's production recovered in the late 2010s, with Benin leading West Africa's franc zone in cotton production in the 2018/2019 and 2019/2020 seasons.

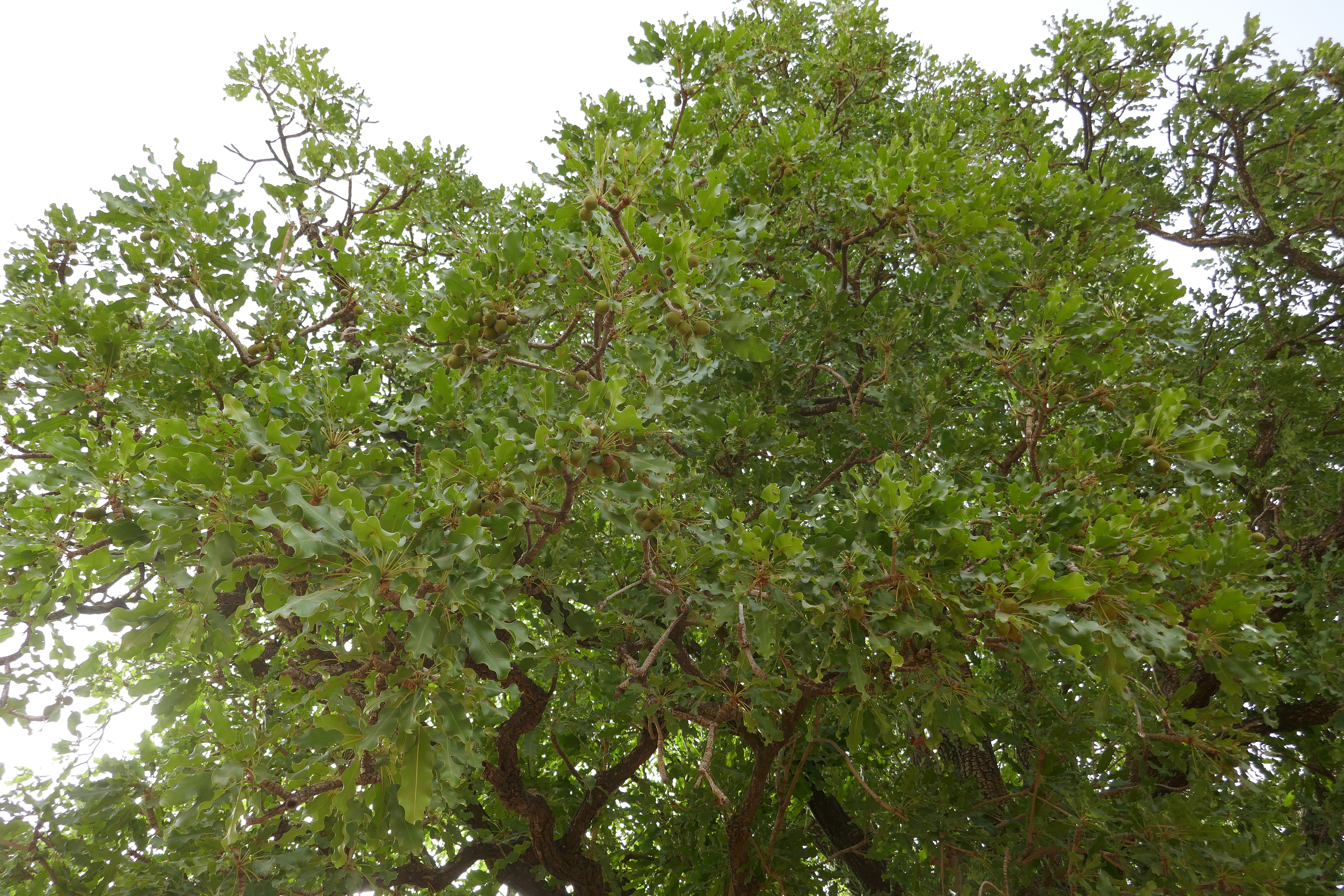
Shea tree in northwest Benin

==== Shea ====
Shea nuts (karité) are collected from native, uncultivated trees in the Sahel band of Benin by individuals who either sell the nuts to wholesalers, or produce shea butter for export or for use in local foods (cooking oil) or in the making of skin ointments or soaps for local consumption. A number of women's cooperatives have become involved in shea butter. Shea butter is a substitute for cocoa butter and remains highly sought after on the world market for confectionery or cosmetic use. Shea trees grow widely across West Africa. They only begin to bear fruit after 20 years of growth, do not reach maturity for 45 years, and can produce nuts for up to 200 years after reaching maturity. The long time before nut production has made them unattractive for commercialization. In some areas the trees are shades trees for other crops in certain dry areas. The shea nuts are surrounded by a soft fruit and fall to the ground June through August. The collected nuts are buried in pits which cause the pulp to ferment and disintegrate, and the heat produced prevents germination. The nuts are then dried, shelled, and winnowed, usually by hand. The kernels are dried further to reduce moisture content from about 40% to about 7%. Benin is the world's sixth largest producer of shea nuts and has two processing plants. Sinocog Bohicon is the larger of the two, with a 10,000-ton capacity that usually works at 25% utilization per year. The second plant is Sonicog Cononou, with 5,000 tons of processing capacity, usually reaching 20% utilization per year. Benin is estimated to produce (collect) about 50,000 tons of shea nuts a year, exports about 35,000 tons of nuts per year, and produces a small amount of shea butter for exports, about 100 tons.

==== Cashew nuts ====
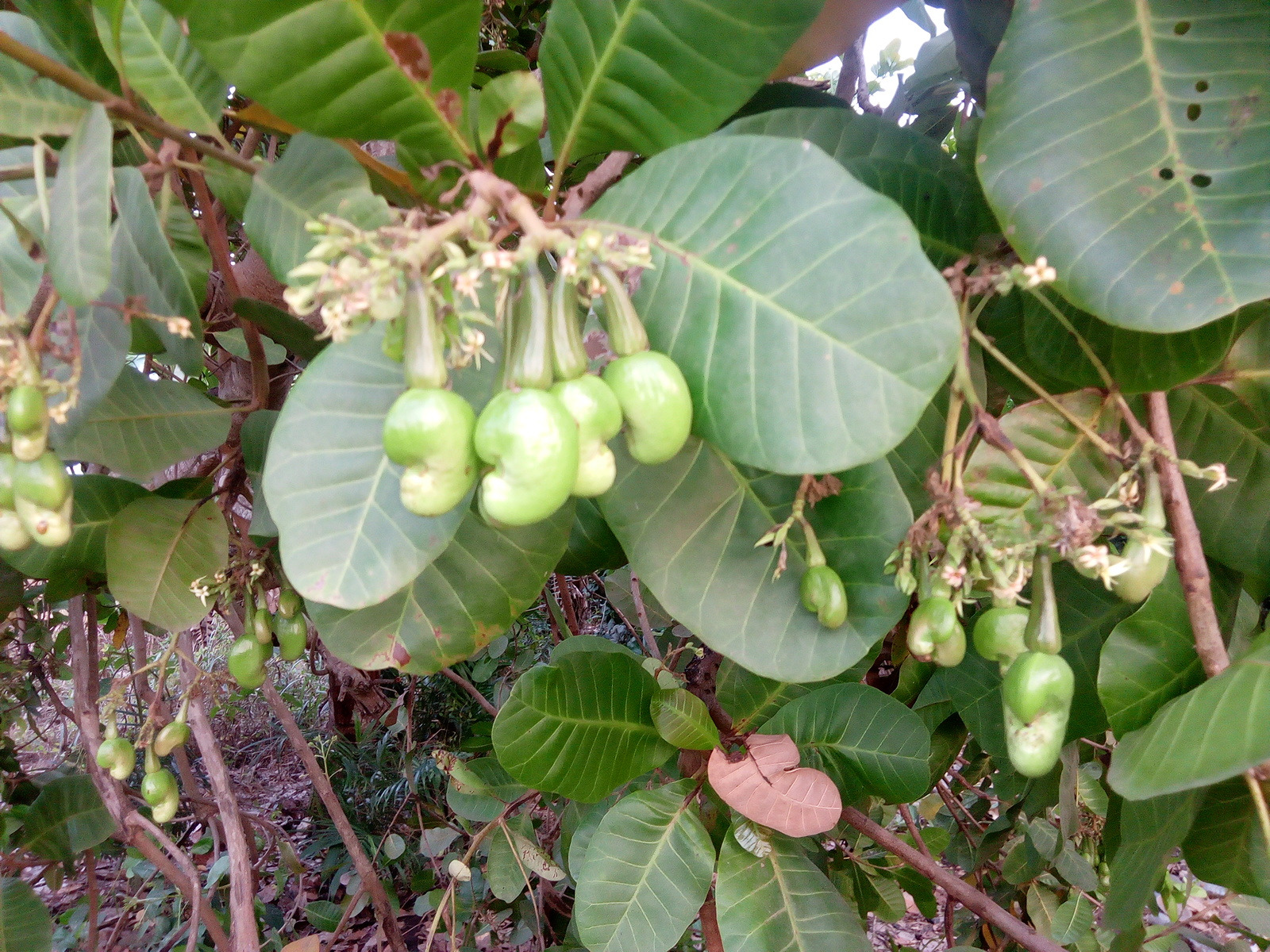
Cashew fruits in Pobè

Benin's cashew nuts are considered to be the second best in West Africa, after Guinea-Bissau's. The late 1990s saw international demand for cashews increase and stimulate interest in increasing production in Benin. Cashew plantations grew from about 10,000 hectares (25,000 acres) in 1990 to more than 190,000 hectares (470,000 acres) in 2008, according to FAOSTAT data. Some 200,000 growers raise the crops on plots averaging between 1 and 1.5 hectares (2.5 and 3.7 acres), with growers averaging 1.5 plots each. The largest plots are between 5 and 30 hectares (12 and 74 acres), with very few reaching up to 50 hectares (120 acres) in size. Cashews can be grown all over the country, but the lower third of the country (from Ketou up to Gougounou), not including the littoral area, is the optimal production area. Production in 2008 was estimated at 98,938 tons. Exports from Benin reached 116,398 tons in 2008, 15% of which included cashew nuts from other countries, such as Nigeria, Togo, and Burkina Faso—all much smaller producers. Cashew nut exports represent about 8% of total export value, 7% of agricultural GDP, and 3% of the national GDP in 2008. The farm gate price in 2008 averaged $500.00 per ton, with each farmer producing about ½ ton annually. Very few inputs are used, with some pesticides and fertilizer specific for cotton used when diverted.

In the mid-2000s, the non-governmental organization TechnoServe pursued a public-private partnership to establish a processing plant, Afokantan Benin, located south of Parakou, as a joint venture between a Beninese entrepreneur and the leading Dutch cashew kernel broker Global Trading, with support from the Dutch Government Private Sector Investment Programme and the African Cashew Alliance. This factory has a capacity of 1,500–2,000 tons per year and is the only facility processing at any scale. It produces white kernels which go onto the Netherlands. There are a few other smaller commercial operations, but none operating with substantial impact on the market. Artisanal producers are also active as well, producing for the domestic market and some exports to Nigeria and Togo. Raw nuts are exported to mostly India (70% of total production), with Vietnam, Pakistan, and Singapore (25% shared between them) next, followed by Malaysia, Sri Lanka, Thailand, China, and Indonesia. Only 5% remains for local processing or nearby informal trade to Nigeria and Togo of locally processed/packaged cashews. The cashew apples, the fleshy part above the nut, with an estimated production of 600,000 tons per year, go unutilized and could be used to make juice, jam, alcohol or biofuels. Within Benin domestic consumption of the nuts is concentrated to celebratory occasions (weekends, parties, holidays) or for use as traveling gifts.

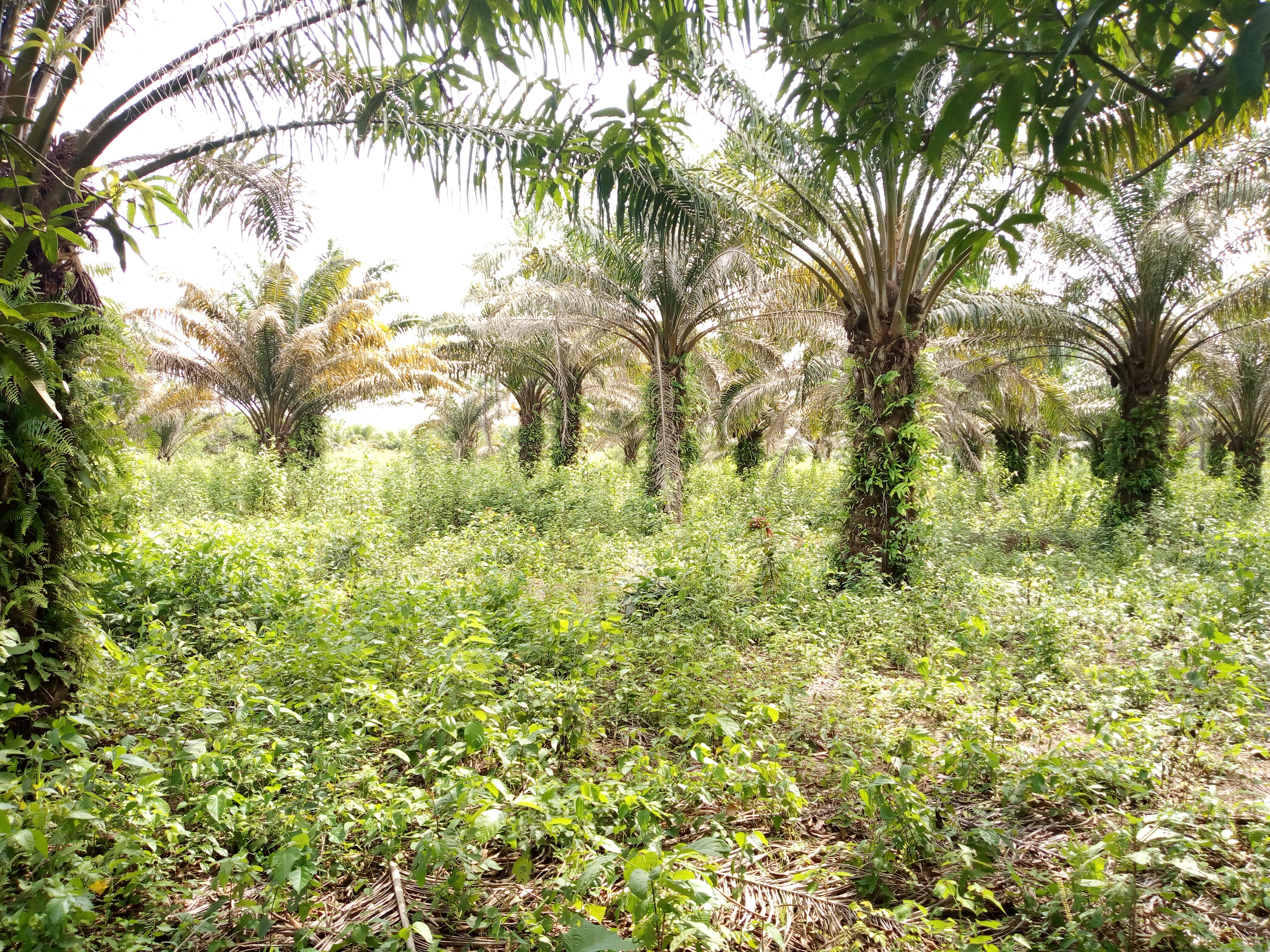
Palm grove in Abomey-Calavi

==== Palm oil ====
Oil palm has been an important crop in Benin since the 19th century, when palm groves were established to meet the oil demand for soaps in the Western world. Oil palms are indigenous to West Africa, naturally occurring in swampy areas. The many products from the plants (fibers, oils, sap) have been used for centuries by local populations. Commercial usage focuses upon the oil from the meat surrounding the kernels (palm oil), and the oil within the kernel (palm kernel oil). Estimates on the size of the palm plantations at the historical peak in the 1930s put them covering 500,000 hectares (1,200,000 acres). Processing in those days was by hand, with women primarily serving as small-scale producers and processors. Benin undertook an oil palm industrialization program in the 1950s and began to invest in large-scale, public, industrial processing facilities. With independence in 1960, the national government increased the effort and focused on improving productivity by planting around 30,000 hectares (74,000 acres) of selected oil palm seedlings between 1960 and 1974. Challenges came: rainfall decreased and management problems rose, while external competition from Asian countries pressured profitability, leading the government to back away from the industrialized palm oil sector. The problems hit the small-holder producers as well and the peak number of palm groves dropped from 500,000 hectares (1,200,000 acres) to an estimated 300,000 hectares (740,000 acres) by 2000. Current estimates put the land under cultivation at between 300,000 and 400,000 hectares (740,000 and 990,000 acres), mostly in Ouémé, Plateau, Atlantic, Mono, Couffo, and Zou Districts.

The industry's troubles continued during the 1960s and 1970s with the manner in which the government approached the industry; some farmers had their plantations expropriated by the government and were to be compensated with annual rent payments. Farmer unhappiness with the low rents led to the destruction of 2,000 hectares (4,900 acres) or more of oil palm plantations in the early 1990s in protest. In response the government tripled rent payments and began an oil palm seedling distribution program in 1993 (private nurseries were subsidized to sell seedlings), and made efforts to privatize the large processing facilities and offer support to private sector processors for equipment purchases.

Recent efforts by the Government to revitalize the agriculture sector have included a focus on exploring biofuel production, and oil palm improvements are at the center of this effort. Groups from Malaysia, South Africa, and China have visited Benin to examine the possibilities of investing in the business.

Annual palm oil production has grown from 31,000 tons in 1961 to 50,000 tons in 2013, averaging about 5% growth per year.

=== Commercial processing ===
Benin possesses limited agricultural processing facilities of any scale. There are a number of cotton gins, an edible oil (cottonseed) processing plant, some smaller palm oil facilities, a sugar refinery, and some juice processors. Cottage-level processing of a number of agricultural products is widespread, but limited to village-level production capacity in all but a few cases. Some cooperatives are engaged in shea processing to make shea butter and locally used shea products, especially soaps and skin ointments. This work is important for a number of women's groups and cooperatives, and shea butter has become a more important export crop for Benin. The Fludor cottonseed plant began operations in 1996 but, as cottonseed supplies have diminished, switched to processing soybean oil and shea butter. Owned by a German expatriate, it is managed by Indian nationals and sells cottonseed cake and soybean powder and husks for animal feed. The SUCOBE sugar refinery is near Save in Collines Department, next to a 5,000-hectare (12,000-acre) cane plantation and a man-made reservoir supplying irrigation. It is a joint project between the governments of Benin and Nigeria. A Chinese company operates it under a lease agreement.

As of 2014, there were only three small-scaled, under-developed fruit processing units in Benin. One of them, IRA (Initiative pour la Relance de l'Ananas), is located in the country pineapple belt of Allada and produces only pineapple juice. IRA is a cooperative made up of groups of pineapple farmers in Benin. In 2009, the group was able to access funding through the Millennium Challenge compact of U.S. $200,000 to purchase modern processing equipment and as of 2014 processed about 80 tons a day of pineapple into canned juice. The other fruit processors have rudimentary pineapple processing units and utilize (re-use) disposable bottles for their juice packaging. The GOB has set up four vegetable and fruit processing units to process tomatoes, oranges, pineapple, and mangoes to add value to these crops and reduce post-harvest losses.

=== General agricultural cultivation and production practices ===
Benin has a large percentage of land that can be considered grassland cover, over 90%, which is the highest percentage of grassland cover in sub-Saharan Africa. Benin's land utilization breaks down into the following components: 25% (27,500 km^{2} (10,600 square miles)) is in forested zones, 23.5% (25,850 km^{2} (9,980 square miles)) is arable land that is now used for agriculture or could be, 8% (8,800 km^{2} (3,400 square miles)) is already in permanent crop production, some 4% (4,400 km^{2} (1,700 square miles)) is used as permanent pasture for grazing livestock, and the remainder of 39.4% (43,450 km^{2} (16,780 square miles)) is in other uses (urban areas, coastal, roads, etc.). Land utilization crosses categories, with crop stubble feeding ruminants, and grazing taking place in afforested areas. Livestock is an important component of agricultural production, contributing about 6% of GDP from the husbandry of cattle, goats and sheep, pigs, poultry, grasscutters (greater cane rats), and snails. Approximately 36% of Benin households engage in some form of raising livestock, and it is particularly important for the North. Around 87% of households in Alibori Department and 41% of households in Borgou Department depend upon livestock as their main economic activity, and it is very important as an economic livelihood in Donga, Mono, and Zou Departments as well. In 2004, there were approximately 1.8 million cattle, 2.3 million goats & sheep, 293,000 pigs, and 13.2 chickens in Benin. Capture fisheries (sea and fresh water) production provides work for 70,000 people and produces 2% of GDP, reaching an estimated high of 40,000 tons harvested in 2005.

On average, Benin farmers cultivate plots 1–2 hectares (2.5–4.9 acres) in size, with 85% of farmers growing corn, 30% cassava, 31% yams, and 30% sorghum. Only 11% grow cotton, the principal cash crop for the country. The largest plots of farmland are found in Borgou, followed by Atacora, Collines, Alibori, Donga, Plateau, Ouémé, Atlantique, Mono, and Couffo in that order. The leading departments with the highest percentage of households engaged in crops or gardens for food production and income are as follows: Atacora 80%, Alibori 70%, Donga 60%, Collines 54%, Borgou 53%, Couffo 44%, Plateau 40%, and Zou 37%.

A report undertaken by the Council of Private Investors in Benin in 2007 divided the country into eight agricultural zones in regards to crop cultivation and animal husbandry practices. The zones, working from the north to the south, are as follows:

- Zone I. Area comprising Karimana, Malanville, and northern Kandi in Alibori District. Situated along the Niger River, this area has two major types of soil, susceptible to erosion. Major crops produced here include millet, sorghum, and cowpeas. Riverbed areas produce cotton, corn, rice, beans, onions, peppers, leafy vegetables, and a small amount of potatoes. This area has larger amounts of arable land and draft animals are common. The riverbed locations permit much off-season vegetable production, especially peppers and tomatoes which are usually marketed in the two large markets in Karimana and Malanville. Some of this production goes outside the local area via traders to destinations further south or in neighboring countries.
- Zone II. Area of Kerou, northeast Kouande in Atacora and Banikoara, Segbana, Gougounou, and southern Kandi, all in Alibori District. Soils here are subject to erosion and major rainfall season is once annually. Cotton is important here, with corn, peanuts, sorghum, yam, and cassava also in production. Shea and cashew nuts are found here as well.
- Zone III. Area of Southern Borgou to Donga, including Pehunco, Parakou, N'Dali, Perere, Nikki, Dinende, Kalade, and Bembereke. Soil fertility is variable here with leaching as the leading soil issue. Annual rainfall in one period mostly. Shea trees are important here. Crops are primarily sorghum, yams, cotton and corn intercropped. Additional crops include cassava, peanuts, rice and legumes where there is more water. Animal husbandry is important to this area.
- Zone IV. Area of Ouake, Copargo, Boukoumbe, Tanguieta, Materi, Natitingou, Toukountouna, Kouande, Cobly, and West Djougou where rainfall is irregular and fluctuates in volume. Predominantly a dry, savannah area with generally infertile soils, except in the permanently moist areas along watercourses. Crops include millet, sorghum, black fonio, bambara groundnuts, cowpeas, and peanuts. Moist areas can sustain cocoyam, water yams, sweet potatoes, rice, and assorted vegetables commercially important during the off-season.
- Zone V. This area is composed of Atacora, Borgou, Mono, and Ouémé to Zou. The Bassila area in Atacora has large amounts of virgin (uncultivated) land. Area has higher rainfall. The main crops include yams, corn, cassava, peanuts, rice, citrus, and cashew nuts. Shea, almonds, African Locust beans (Parkia nuts), and peppers are also produced. Annuals and fruit crops can do well in this area.
- Zone VI. Area of Plateau, Atlantique, Mono, Couffo, and Ouémé to Zou. It rains here twice annually, on a heavily degraded hardpan soil that is easy to cultivate. Leading crops are corn, peanuts, cowpeas, cassava, peppers, coffee, mangos, citrus, bananas, legumes, and oil palms. Breeding of ruminants (cattle, goats, sheep) is important here, along with poultry and fisheries. Some private irrigation efforts during the off-season produce legumes and rice.
- Zone VII. An area comprising Atlantique, Mono, Ouémé, and Zou. Rainfalls twice a year, on a fertile soil with a high clay content that makes it harder to work. Corn is the major crop, followed by cowpeas, vegetables, and rice. Here poultry and smallholder livestock husbandry is important economically.
- Zone VIII. Area of Atlantique, Littoral, Mono, Ouémé. Rain falls twice a year, on very fertile alluvial soils in some areas and on poor sandy soils. Corn is the lead staple crop, cowpeas and vegetables next in importance economically. Corn and cassava are grown in the sandy soil. Arable land is limited in this area due to the major cities being located within it.

=== Livestock ===
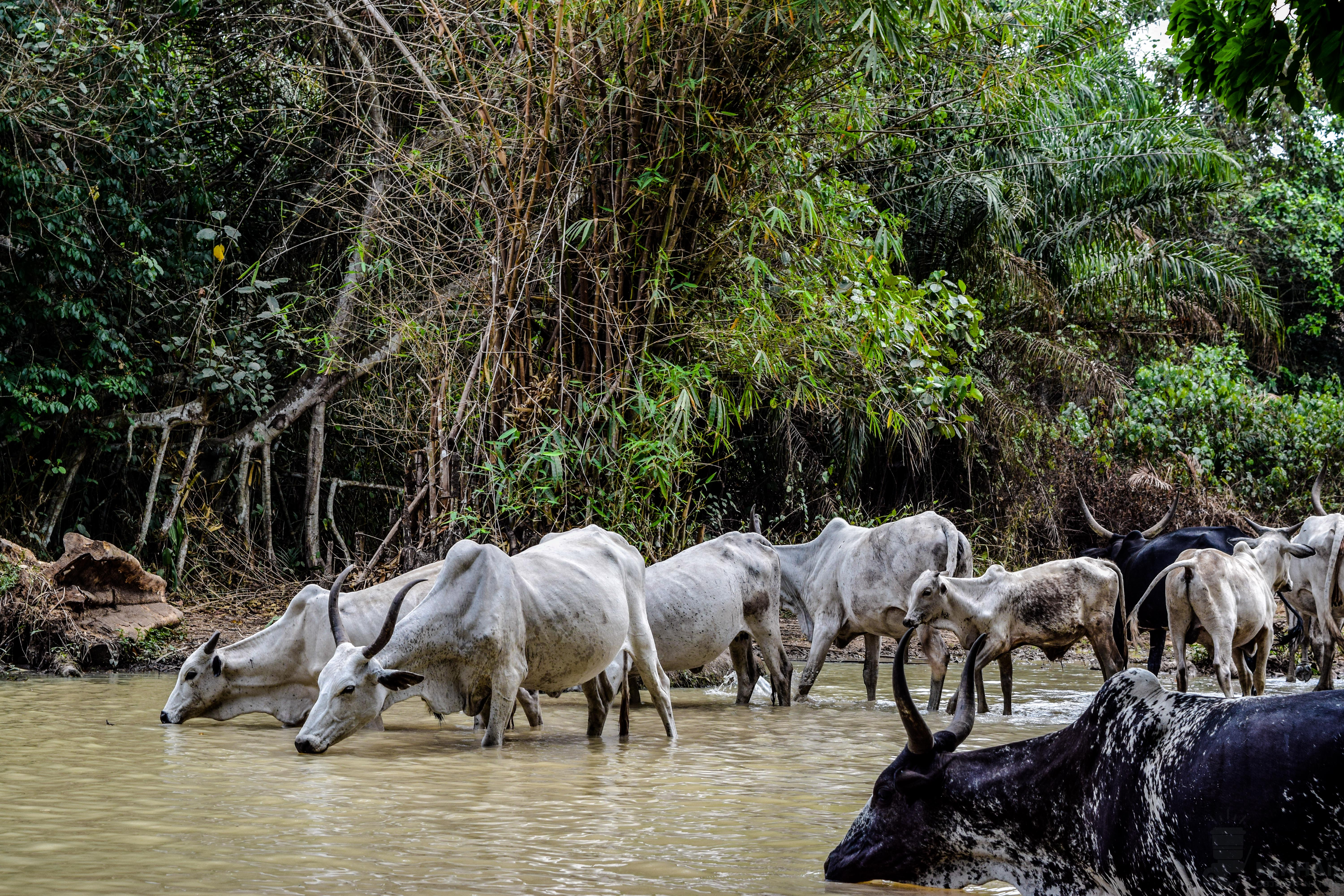
Cattle in Lokoli

Cattle, goats and sheep are the primary animals raised in Benin, most found on the northern grasslands. Pasturage for cattle, goats and sheep is whatever natural plant growth occurs in the area, supplemented by crop residues when these are available. Sheep are often tethered while grazing and goats are left to forage on their own. Very few individuals provide cut fodders or concentrated animal feed for their animals. Benin has numerous grasses suitable for grazing ruminants, but during the dry season can experience shortages in areas of suitable plants, or the available plants provide low nutrition. This is the primary reason for the seasonal migration patterns of most animals. Poultry and pigs are also important economically, but there are very few large operators and most production is at the household level. Grasscutters, rabbits, and African snails round out the livestock assortment.

==== Cattle ====
There is no predominant breed of cattle in the country, with a constant mixing of the herd. Breeds most common in Benin include Lagune (Dwarf West African Shorthorn), Somba (Savannah Shorthorn), Borgou (local cross between Zebu and humpless crossbred), and Zebu. Most of the cattle are raised in a seasonal migration pattern, with a small portion (20% or less) raised in a sedentary manner mostly in the southern portions of the country. Borgou, Alibori, Atacora, and Donga Districts hold most of the cattle. Fulani are the main herders, and often work for hire. Herds are moved from north to south and back, depending upon available forage and water supplies. Herds in the north can be as large as 80 or so animals. Most cattle are raised for meat, some cattle near towns produce milk for sale. A few cattle in the northeast area are raised in small herds with very limited movement (Somba farmers), and a larger group in the southern area are raised with a few animals per household, where the households are in areas demarked by waterways. Here the animals are moved around depending on availability of forage from location to location, household by household. Some villages hire herdsmen to oversee the village animals. Total herd size for the country is estimated at between 750,000 and 1 million animals.

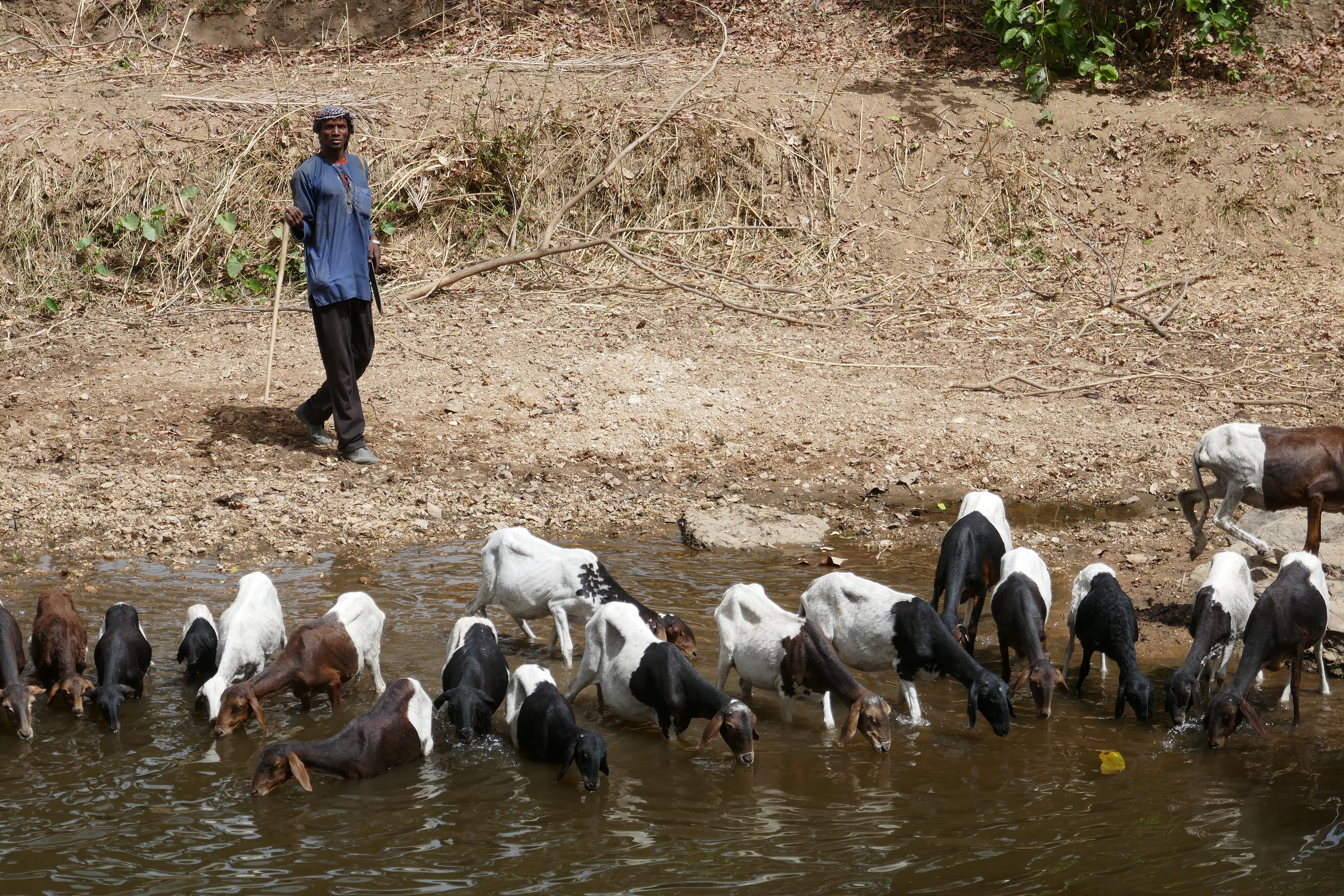
Goats with herder, Benin

==== Goats and sheep ====
The small ruminants are generally kept by individual households, who usually hold two to five animals. These animals are raised off the land, with very few getting any kind of supplemental feeding or health treatment. The combined herd of goats and sheep is estimated to be between 1.5 and 1.8 million animals. There are two breeds of sheep, the Sahelian (larger) and the Guinean (small). The Sahelian breed predominates among the sheep in the north and reach up to 80 kilograms (180 lb) live weight. Smaller sheep average 30 kilograms (66 lb) in live weight. Goats are found all across the country and are usually either the African Dwarf breed (for meat) or the long-legged Sahelian goat (for milking). Meat goats range in size from 15 to 20 kilograms (33 to 44 lb), while the milking goats average closer to 35 kilograms (77 lb) per animal. More goats are found in the southern part of the country than sheep, where they are more popular because there are some cultural and ethnic restrictions on raising sheep. Ownership of goats is popular among women due to the ease of care and because they are cheaper to own and present less risk compared to other livestock.

==== Cross-border market for poultry meat ====
Benin is a major importer of poultry meat and does not consume most of what is imported. Most goes to Nigeria. Poultry meat is scarce in Nigeria, and cost of poultry production is also high. Despite this, the Government of Nigeria (GON) maintains a ban on legal frozen poultry imports, primarily to protect local producers, whereas poultry meat is free for import in Benin. Benin's poultry sector is small, with domestic poultry meat production of about 13,000 tons in 2013, but a conservative estimate of poultry meat imports into Benin that year exceeded 160,000 tons (about 6,500 units of 40-foot containers) valued at more than US$450 million. (Some Benin importers indicated that poultry imports are actually as high as 300,000 tons annually). More than 85% of this is shipped to Benin for onward sales into Nigeria—entering the Nigerian market through informal cross-border trading activities (as do rice, intermediate and consumer-oriented food, and agricultural products of all type).

Poultry meat importers in Benin want the GON to maintain Nigeria's import ban on poultry meat in order for them to continue to serve the huge and increasing Nigerian poultry meat consumers. However, some poultry meat importers in Benin also own poultry operations, mostly for egg production and some poultry meat processing and packaging. Many fish importers are also shifting to poultry meat imports using their existing cold storage facilities, and others are expanding their storage facilities particularly around the Benin-Nigeria border, to meet Nigeria's increasing demand for imported poultry products at the border. Poultry farmers produce mostly eggs for domestic consumption. For poultry meat, they are limited more by the country's market size than cost of production inputs. Although they still have easy and adequate supplies of corn, soybeans, and other feed ingredients, they fear the cost of production is rising due mainly to increasing human consumption of these products (particularly corn and soybeans). Generally, Benin's poultry farmers want the GON to remove its import ban on poultry meat in order for them to gain free access into Nigeria's massive market. One Benin farm is very integrated and stocks about 50,000 birds (chickens), produces other poultry types as well, compounds its own feeds, has its own poultry processing and packaging facilities, and supplies poultry meat to one of the country's large supermarkets. The farm also runs an aquaculture farm and owns a newly established poultry farm that has the capacity to hold over 100,000 birds. Currently, the new farm is stocking about 10,000 birds, and the firm seeks partners and markets, especially in Nigeria, to optimize its operations.

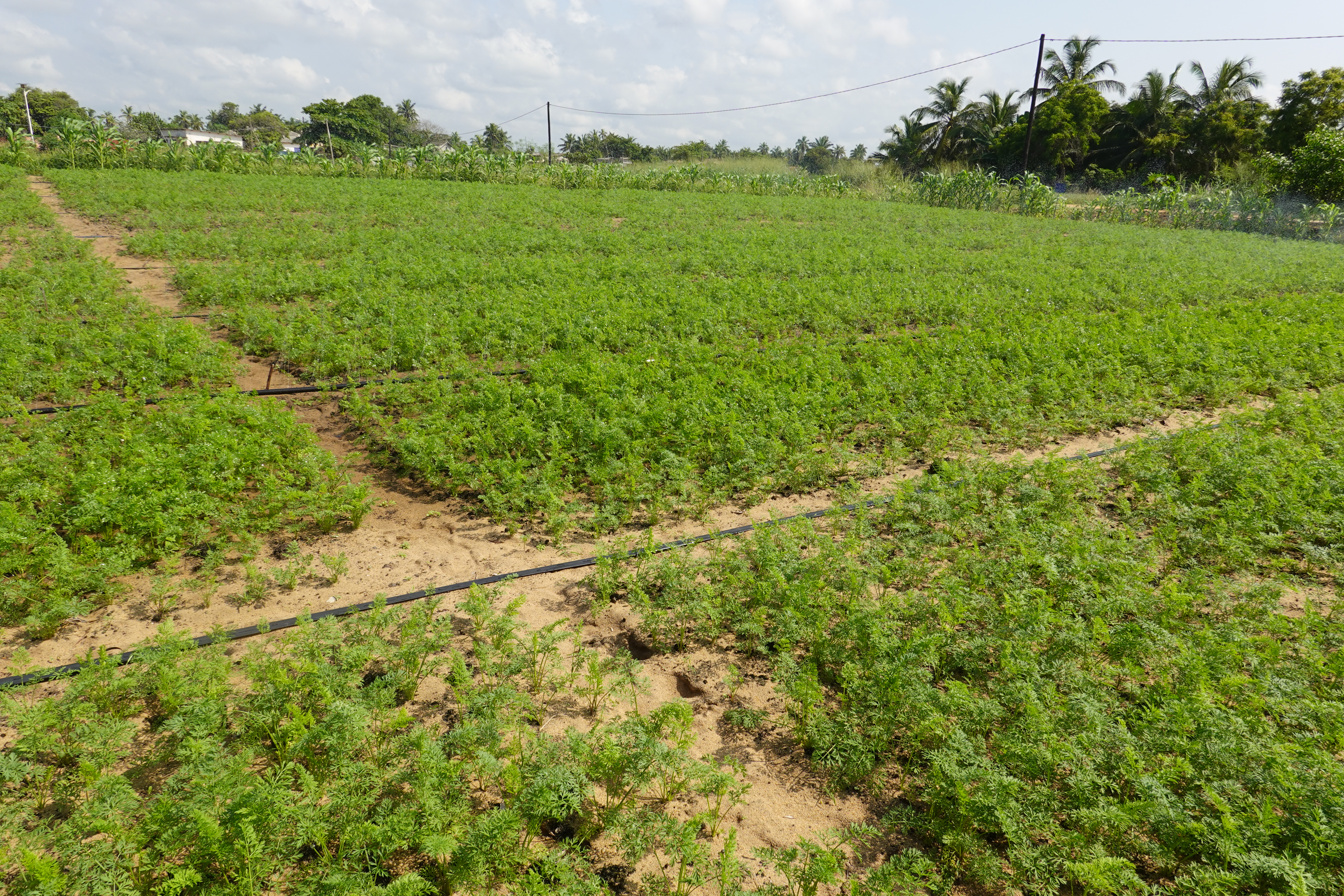
Carrot field in Grand-Popo

=== Vegetables ===
Vegetables in Benin are produced in many different systems and locations, but can be generally put in two distinct categories: 1) a lowland vegetable farming system in the rural areas and 2) an urban and peri-urban production system. In lowland cultivation, traditional vegetables such as tomato, pepper, onion, okra, and leafy vegetables are the most dominant type of vegetables produced. In the urban and peri-urban vegetable production system, vegetables may be both traditional and non-traditional (exotic). With the strong economic growth in Benin, the demand for non-traditional vegetables such as cabbage, carrot, lettuce, and cucumber has increased. Plot sizes are an average of .5 hectares (1.2 acres) where a variety of different vegetables are grown nearby the larger cities.

Vegetable production includes tomato, pepper, onion, okra across the country; and cabbage, carrot, lettuce, and cucumber growing in specific areas suitable for this type of crop. Leafy vegetables are grown year-round where there is water available. Waterways and river valley locations are prime vegetable growing sites, except during the flood season from September to December and the November to March dry season. The Cotonou area has 400 hectares (990 acres) of land allocated for peri-urban plots of vegetables, with producers working plots between .25 and .5 hectares (0.62 and 1.24 acres) each. This area has dependable ground water and produces year-round, with most of the production marketed in Cotonou or exported to Nigeria. The largest vegetable farm in Benin (50 ha (120 acres)) is located here in this coastal area just outside of Cotonou in Grand-Popo.

Vegetable production is meant for local consumption and export to neighboring countries, especially Nigeria. Import of vegetables from Burkina Faso and Niger increases during the off season between November and March.

Growers sell to wholesalers or retailers by unwritten agreement and almost never sell directly to end consumers. Most production goes to local consumption or over to Nigeria. During the dry season Burkina Faso and Niger produce vegetables for sale in Benin, tomatoes in particular.

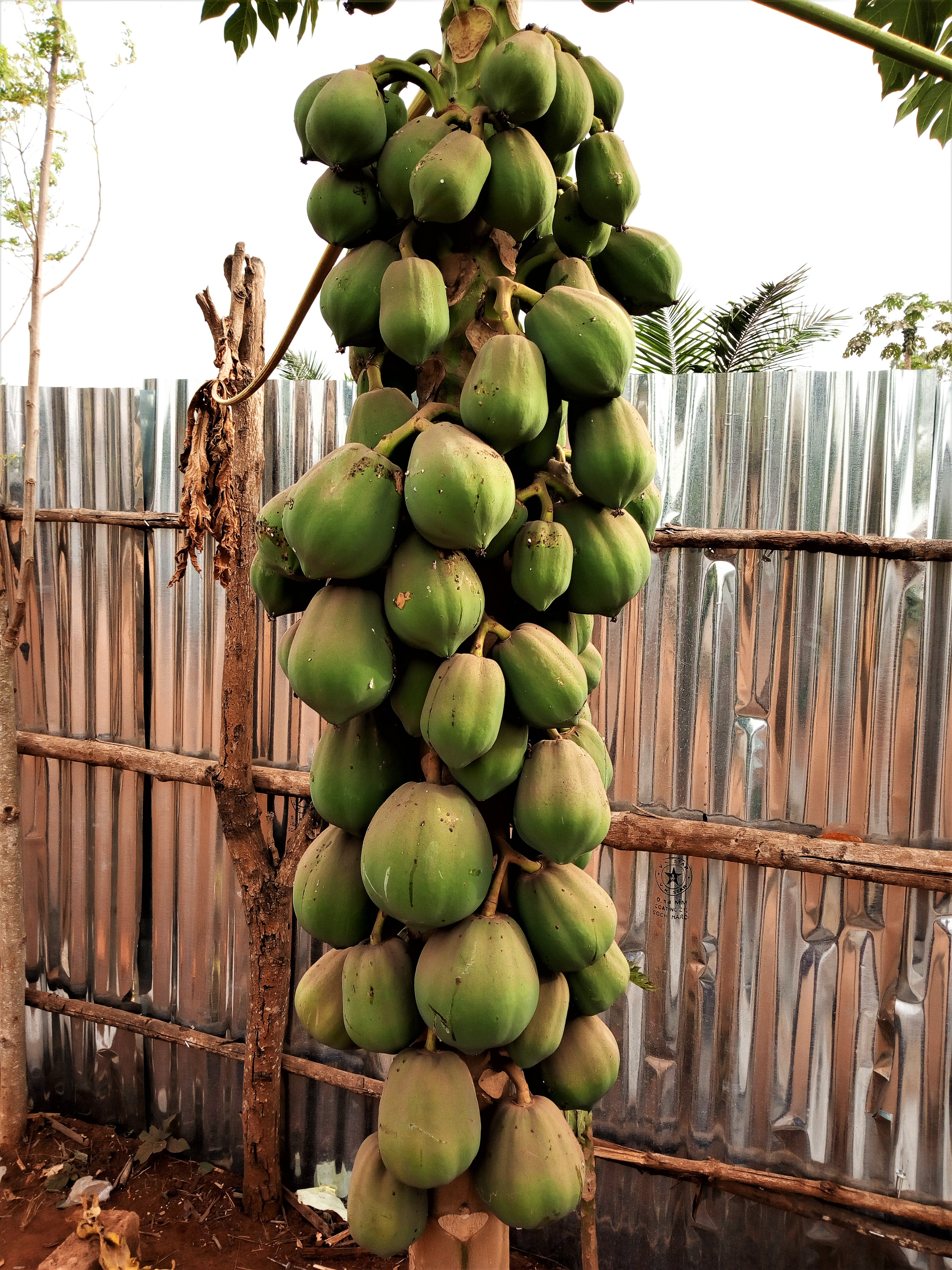
Papaya tree in Benin

=== Fruits ===
According to INRAB, the best fruit species in Benin are mango, papaya, banana, orange, avocado, guava, and pineapple, considering cost and income intensity, profitability and investment comparison, and financial competitiveness. Papaya, banana, and orange contribute more to producers' income and profitability, whereas increased pineapple production participates in jobs creation. From virtual non-existence in the 1980s to 222,000 tons of production in 2009, the pineapple sector now accounts for 1.2% of Benin GDP and 4.3% of the country's agricultural GDP after cotton and cashew nuts, ahead of shea butter and palm oil. The pineapple production zones are located in south, and growers fall into two groups, small with plots of 0.5 to 5 hectares (1.2 to 12.4 acres), and large with plots of 5 to 40 hectares (12 to 99 acres). Only 2% of Benin's pineapple production is exported to European markets. Some production is processed into juices locally, and the rest of the fresh pineapple is exported to neighboring countries, particularly Nigeria. In 2009, Benin's pineapple production reached 222,000 tons.

=== Production constraints ===
Farmers in Benin face many obstacles to increasing production. They include rudimentary growing systems, limited access to land in the peri-urban production zones, difficulty in obtaining appropriate land title deed or certificate of land occupancy, a lack of adequate credit, 25% or higher post-harvest losses during peak season production, a lack of coordinated groups to aggregate benefits in marketing and distribution, an absence of appropriate packaging systems for products, and an absence of specific vegetable inputs. Producers utilize the chemical fertilizers and pesticides that are only available for cotton on many other crops, as there are few or no alternatives. Farmers also encounter soil issues: 45% report infertile soils are the greatest problem, a lack of moisture was the next greatest soil issue at 34%, degraded soils were seen as problematic by 32%, and flooding was a problem for 25% of farmers.

- Inadequate input supply. A wide range of fertilizers are being used, especially for vegetable gardens. Imported artificial fertilizers, like urea and NPK, though highly esteemed, are expensive and therefore not widely used. Nitrogen fertilizer is also available as a locally produced brand and is substantially cheaper. However, some farmers cannot afford any of these products, and to enrich the soil they depended partly or wholly on household waste. Urban farmers that have access to chicken manure will use this manure because this is considered to be as effective as artificial fertilizers (high nitrogen content). Although the farmers pay for all these inputs, the costs are considerably lower than for artificial fertilizers.
- Lack of land title. The lack of land titles by most smallholder farmers hinders the ability to invest in equipment such as drip irrigation, or to get access to loans.
- Distrust among farmers. Farmers organized in cooperatives or farmers groups do not regularly work together for sale of their produce. There is a lack of trust among small farmers to aggregate produce and as a result farmers associations are not set up to improve for sales. They like to buy inputs together, but are not organized in selling their produce as a group. Thus, there is a lack of economies of scale to reach bigger and important markets. Aggregating of produce occurs at the traders' level as they develop long-term relationships with individual farmers, where farmers are price takers.
- Pests and disease management. Farmers face many challenges and have no extension services available. Although the use of chemical pesticides is fairly widespread, the amounts available are generally moderate and limited to those with access to cotton input supplies. Over time, several organic pesticides, notably extracts from the Neem tree, have been successfully introduced by a number of international NGOs. Additives such as wood ash and chicken manure have for a long time been known as repellents and are widely used.
- Access to finance. There are no specific agro-loans for smallholder farmers. The lack of land title and inadequate bookkeeping practices of farmers stymies their ability to acquire loans.
- Dependence on rain. Most production in Benin is primarily rain fed and in some cases manually irrigated when farms are in close proximity to major water sources. This dependence results in high seasonal availability of produce and lower prices due to an abundance of produce during the rainy season(s).

== Marketing ==
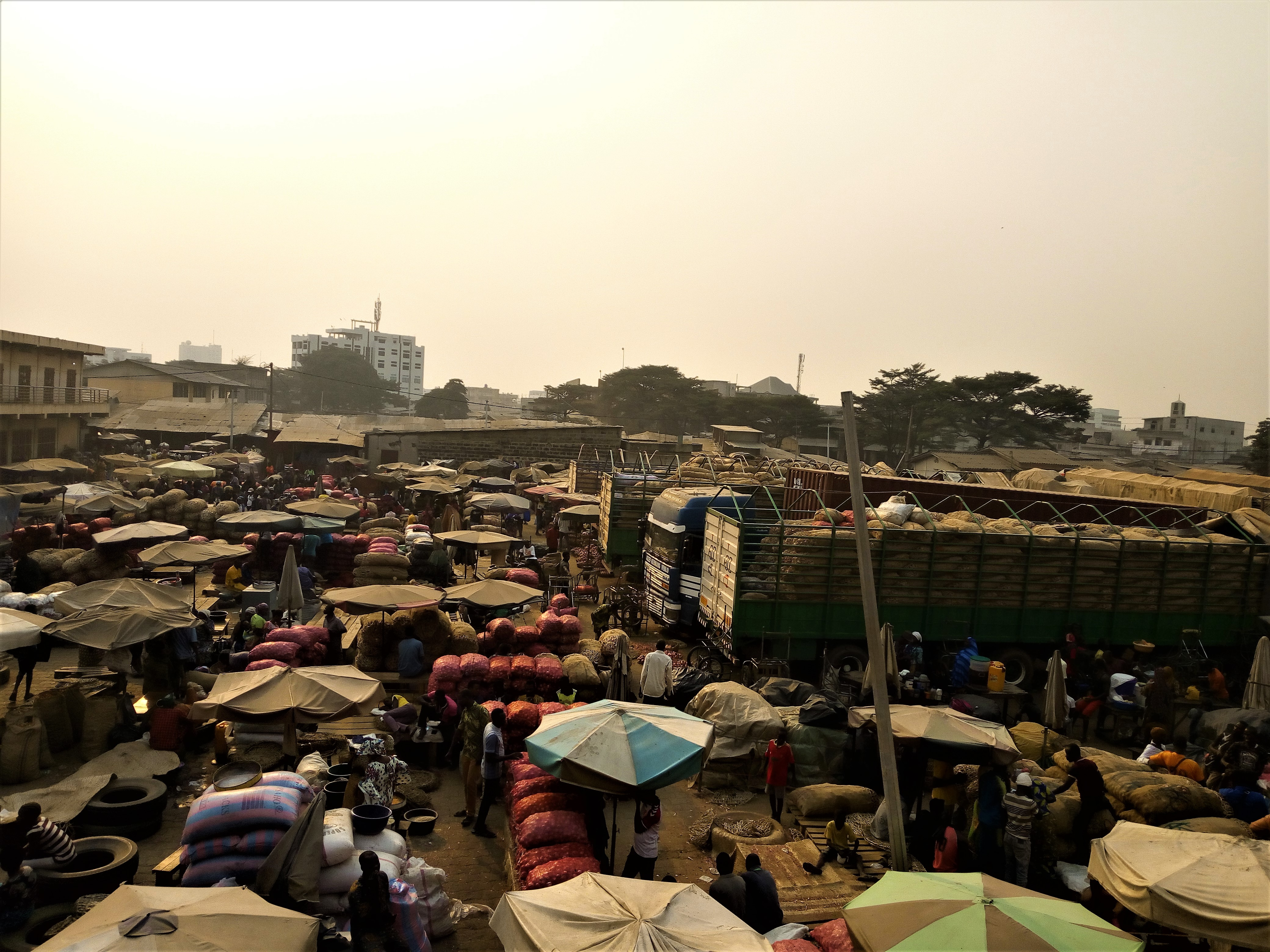
Dantokpa Market

Fresh (wet) markets occur in most towns and villages, usually surrounded by large numbers of small shops selling foods, consumer items, imported foods and goods, clothing, household goods, etc. With a large portion of the population producing much of their own food, particularly for starches, open markets are where the diet is rounded out with items not self-produced. For those with higher incomes, more of the food consumed is purchased at market. Most vegetables are in villages and town markets, which usually have a major day, or multiple days, where traders and retailers are active in selling perishables in particular. Fish, meats, staple starch crops, legumes, soy and milk cheeses, fruits, and vegetables are available in the market every week of the year in most places with significant variations in the quantity supplied. Staple crops are usually sold to retailers by wholesalers, who obtain them from the producers. Meat is sold by the butchers who source from the producers. The source of vegetables depends on the season. Regional trade keeps a selection of vegetables available, with price and quantity fluctuations depending on the season. Visits to markets in the Parakou and Nikki areas observed avocados from Lomé in Togo and red onions from Niger. Eastern border markets have many Nigerian traders coming into Benin to purchase fruits and vegetables for sale in Nigeria. Most of these transactions are not captured in either of the countries' statistical records. Vegetables traders/retailers obtain their products either from the intermediary traders or directly at the farm gate if possible. For many items there are unwritten agreements that producers will sell to retailers, not directly to consumers. Intermediaries buy at the farms and transport the products directly to their various market destinations. Women dominate the role of vegetable retailers at these open markets. Vegetable producers market much of their produce in bulk at harvest time because of the highly perishable nature of their products. In general, producers conduct all of their sales immediately after harvest. The long marketing channel of vegetables in the larger peri-urban and urban areas involves several types of intermediaries, from local traders to wholesalers. Studies by INRAB have shown that producers are more inefficient in marketing than in production. There is a lack of market participation of farmers and current barriers to entry by farmers limit their access to markets.

The development of supermarkets in Cotonou, the primary city of Benin, is still extremely low. Erevan is the only major supermarket/hypermarket based in Cotonou. Headquartered in France, Erevan imports 90% of products from France, either by air or sea freight depending on the commodity and level of demand. They pay extra costs to their freight forwarder to include door-to-door delivery service, since there are no third-party refrigerated transportation providers that provide that service. Erevan pays that extra cost to ensure that their product maintains European Union Standards for food safety and handling when perishable products are being transferred to their store. Some fresh products are locally procured, but this remains very limited.

== Food standards ==
There is no well-defined system for the elaboration of food standards and the Codex committee is not fully functional. Benin's food standards are aligned with international Codex Alimentarius standards.

== See also ==
- Fishing in Benin
