= Natta =

Natta may refer to:

- 29347 Natta, minor planet
- Natta (spider), genus of spiders
- Natta (surname)
- Natta Company, Indian theatre company
- Natta Konysheva (1935–2022), Russian painter
- Natta Nachan (born 1990), Thai javelinist
- Natta, Benin

== See also ==
- Nata (disambiguation)
- Netta (disambiguation)
