= Natas =

Natas may refer to:

- Natas (comics), a DC Comics master martial artist
- Natas (computer virus), a computer virus written by James Gentile
- Natas (group), a Detroit hip hop group consisting of Esham, Mastamind and T-N-T
- Natas Kaupas, American professional skateboarder
- Los Natas, an Argentine rock band
- National Academy of Television Arts and Sciences
- Akkineni Nageswara Rao, a veteran Indian Telugu film actor; sometimes nicknamed Natasamrat
- King Natas, the villain of the Dungeon Explorer video games

== See also ==
- Nata (disambiguation)
