= Nati =

Nati may refer to:

== People ==
- Nati (surname) (including a list of people with the name)
- Nati Seiberg (1956) an Israeli American theoretical physicist who works on string theory

== Places ==
- Nati' District a district of the Al Bayda Governorate, Yemen
- Punta Nati Lighthouse an active lighthouse on the Spanish island of Menorca
- Nati, village in Mongmit Township, Myanmar
- Informal name for Natitingou, Benin

== Other uses ==
- Nāti language, spoken in Malekula, Vanuatu
- Nati (dance), performed in the Indian state of Himachal Pradesh
- Nati (film), a 2016 Indian film
- Nati, a giant from List of jötnar in Norse mythology
- NATI (motorcycle), Russian research institute of car industry
- Nati stanchi, a 2002 Italian comedy film
- nickname of the Switzerland national football team
- nickname of Switzerland's national basketball team

== See also ==
- Nata (disambiguation)
- Nat (disambiguation)
