= Peter A. Reiling =

- Education: Georgetown University (B.S.F.S); University of California, Berkeley (M.B.A)
- Occupation: Business executive
- Title: Netflix (Vice President)
- Honours: Outstanding Social Entrepreneur

Peter A. Reiling is an American businessman and executive vice president for leadership at the Aspen Institute.

== Education ==
In 1979, Reiling earned a B.S. in Foreign Service (BSFS) from Georgetown University. Afterwards he joined the Peace Corps and was sent to Togo, West Africa. In 1982 he was offered a job with the USAID in Niger. After 5 years in Africa he moved back to the US and, in 1986, he obtained an MBA from the University of California, Berkeley, with additional studies at the Université libre de Bruxelles.

== Career ==
He joined TechnoServe in 1987. In 1992 he was asked to lead TechnoServe's offices in Ghana and in 1996 he became president and CEO of TechnoServe. In 1998 he completed the Henry Crown Fellowship Program of the Aspen Institute. In 2004 he left TechnoServe to work for the Aspen Institute and to build the Aspen Global Leadership Network.

Reiling is a former adjunct professor at the School of International and Public Affairs at Columbia University and guest speaker at the Tokyo Institute for Developing Economies. From 2004-2018, he served as Trustee of the Aspen Institute as well as Executive Vice President for Leadership and Seminar Programs and Executive Director of the Henry Crown Fellowship Program.

He is married to Denise Byrne and has two children.

== Affiliations ==
- Co-founder of the Africa Leadership Initiative (ALI)
- Co-founder of the Aspen Network of Development Entrepreneurs
- Chairman of the board of the CALI Foundation
- Board member of Georgetown University’s Beeck Center for Social Impact and Innovation
- Board member of ALI/East Africa, ALI/West Africa and ALI/South Africa, MELI and the China Fellowship Program
- Member of the Council on Foreign Relations
- Trustee, officer, and senior moderator of the Aspen Institute

== Honors ==
- "Outstanding Social Entrepreneur" by the Schwab Foundation for Social Entrepreneurship in Geneva
