= Manta, Benin =

Manta
- Arrondissement and town
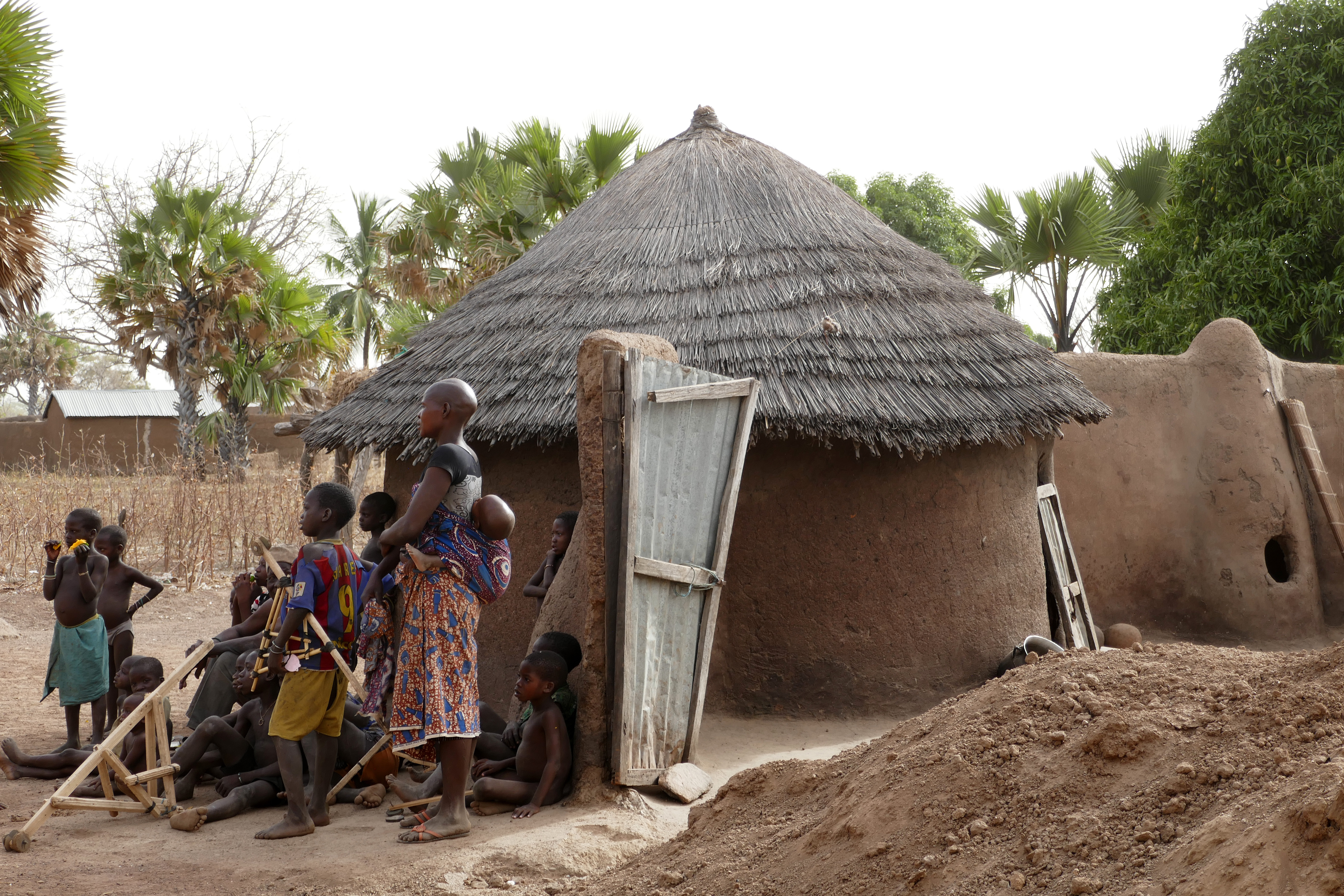
- Manta Village

- Location in Benin
- Coordinates: 10°21′23″N 1°6′20″E
- Country: Benin
- Department: Atakora Department
- Commune: Boukoumbè

Population (2013)
  - Total: 13,633
- Time zone: UTC+1 (WAT)

Manta is a town and arrondissement in the Atakora Department of northwestern Benin. It is an administrative division under the jurisdiction of the commune of Boukoumbè. According to the population census conducted by the Institut National de la Statistique Benin on 2013, the arrondissement had a total population of 13,633.

== Village ==
- Dikon Hein
- Dikouténi
- Dimatadoni
- Dimatima
- Dipokor
- Dipokor-Tchaaba
- Kouhingou
- Koukouakoumagou
- Koukouangou
- Koumadogou
- Kounatchatiégou
- Koutangou-Manta
- Koutchantié
- Takotiéta
- Tatchadiéta

== Education ==
Manta has a college.
