= Nata =

Nata or NATA may refer to:

== Places ==
- Nata, Botswana, a village in Central District of Botswana
- Nata, Cyprus, a small village near Paphos, Cyprus
- Natá, Coclé, a town and corregimiento in Natá District, Coclé Province, Panama
- Natá District, a district of Coclé Province, Panama
- Nata, Nzega, a ward of Nzega District, Tabora Region, Tanzania

== Music ==
- Nata, a musical scale in Carnatic music (South Indian classical music)
- Nata (band), a hard rock band from Guadalajara (Mexico) founded by Galo Ochoa
- Natanael Cano, "Nata" for short
  - Nata, en EP by Natanael Cano

== Foods ==
- Nata can be translated into Portuguese and Spanish as milk skin, the creamy layer that builds on top of milk.
- Nata de coco, a jelly-like food common in East and Southeast Asia
- Pastel de nata, a Portuguese delicacy

== Religion ==
- Nata, an alternate name for Nalakuvara, the divine son of the Buddhist deity Vaisravana
- Nata, an alternate name for the Chinese god Nezha, son of Heavenly King Li Jing, who is equated with Vaisravana

== Other ==
- NatA, the major eukaryotic N-terminal acetyltransferase
- National Aerospace Technology Administration, the North Korean space agency
- National Air Transportation Association, a public policy group representing general aviation interests in the United States
- National Aptitude Test in Architecture, a national examination for admission to undergraduate courses in architecture, India
- National Association of Testing Authorities, an Australian non-profit industry association that provides assessment, accreditation, and training services to laboratories and technical facilities
- National Athletic Trainers' Association, a professional membership association for certified athletic trainers in the US and Canada
- New Approach to Appraisal, a framework for assessing transport projects and proposals in the United Kingdom
- NewGrounds Annual Tournament of Animation, an animation competition
- Natlan (Chinese: 纳塔; pinyin: Nàtǎ), a fictional nation in the video game Genshin Impact.

== See also ==
- Natas (disambiguation)
- Nati (disambiguation)
- Nat (disambiguation)
- Natta (disambiguation)
- Naata (film), a 1955 Indian film by Deena Nath Madhok
