= Dipoli, Benin =

Dipoli
- Arrondissement and town
- Location in Benin
- Coordinates: 10°18′N 01°06′E
- Country: Benin
- Department: Atakora Department
- Commune: Boukoumbè

Population (2002)
  - Total: 16,235
- Time zone: UTC+1 (WAT)

Dipoli is a town and arrondissement in the Atakora Department of northwestern Benin. It is an administrative division under the jurisdiction of the commune of Boukoumbè. According to the population census conducted by the Institut National de la Statistique Benin on February 15, 2002, the arrondissement had a total population of 5,959.
