= Tabota, Benin =

Town in Atakora Department, Benin

Coordinates: 10°18′N 1°12′E

Tabota
- Arrondissement and town
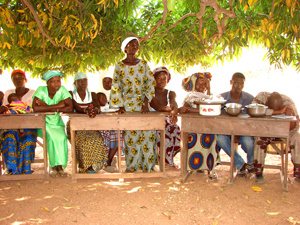
- Interactive map of Tabota
- Country: Benin
- Department: Atakora Department
- Commune: Boukoumbè

Population (2002)
  - Total: 8,811
- Time zone: UTC+1 (WAT)

Tabota is a town and arrondissement in the Atakora Department of northwestern Benin. It is an administrative division under the jurisdiction of the commune of Boukoumbè. According to the population census conducted by the Institut National de la Statistique Benin on February 15, 2002, the arrondissement had a total population of 8,811.
