= Deed =

Type of legal instrument in Common law

A deed is a legal document that is signed and delivered, especially concerning the ownership of property or legal rights. Specifically, in common law, a deed is any legal instrument in writing which passes, affirms or confirms an interest, right, or property and that is signed, attested, delivered, and in some jurisdictions, sealed. It is commonly associated with transferring (conveyancing) title to property. The deed has a greater presumption of validity and is less rebuttable than an instrument signed by the party to the deed. A deed can be unilateral or bilateral. Deeds include conveyances, commissions, licenses, patents, diplomas, and conditionally powers of attorney if executed as deeds. The deed is the modern descendant of the medieval charter, and delivery is thought to symbolically replace the ancient ceremony of livery of seisin.

The traditional phrase signed, sealed and delivered refers to the practice of using seals; however, attesting witnesses have replaced seals to some extent. An agreement under seal may also be called a contract by deed or a specialty; in the United States, a specialty is enforceable without consideration. In some jurisdictions, specialties have a liability limitation period of double that of a simple contract and allow for a third party beneficiary to enforce an undertaking in the deed.

== Requirements ==
At common law, to be valid and enforceable, a deed must meet several requirements:

- It must state on its face that it is a deed, using wording like "This Deed..." or "executed as a deed".
- It must indicate that the instrument itself conveys some privilege or thing to someone.
- The grantor must have the legal ability to grant the thing or privilege, and the grantee must have the legal capacity to receive it.
- It must be executed by the grantor in presence of the prescribed number of witnesses, known as instrumentary witnesses (this is known as being in solemn form).
- In some jurisdictions, a seal must be affixed to it. Originally, affixing seals made persons parties to the deed and signatures optional, but seals are now outdated in most jurisdictions, so the signatures of the grantor and witnesses are primary.
- It must be delivered to (delivery) and, in some jurisdictions, accepted by the grantee (acceptance).

Under the law of England and Wales, a deed may be delivered or otherwise handled in one of three ways:

- it may be delivered as an unconditional deed,
- it may be delivered as a deed in escrow, or
- it may be handed to an agent who has instructions to deal with it in a certain manner.

Deeds delivered unconditionally are irrevocable.

Section 46(2) of the UK's Companies Act 2006 states that a document executed as a deed by a company is presumed to be delivered upon execution, but this presumption can be rebutted if a contrary intention is proved.

Conditions attached to the acceptance of a deed are known as covenants. A deed indented or indenture is one executed in two or more parts according to the number of parties, which were formerly separated by cutting in a curved or indented line known as the chirograph. A deed poll is one executed in one part, by one party, having the edge polled or cut even, and includes simple grants and appointments.

== Specialties ==
In some jurisdictions, specialties have a liability limitation period of double that of a simple contract and allow for a third party beneficiary to enforce an undertaking in the deed, thereby overcoming the doctrine of privity. Specialties, as a form of contract, are bilateral and can therefore be distinguished from covenants, which, being also under seal, are unilateral promises.

== Deeds of conveyance ==
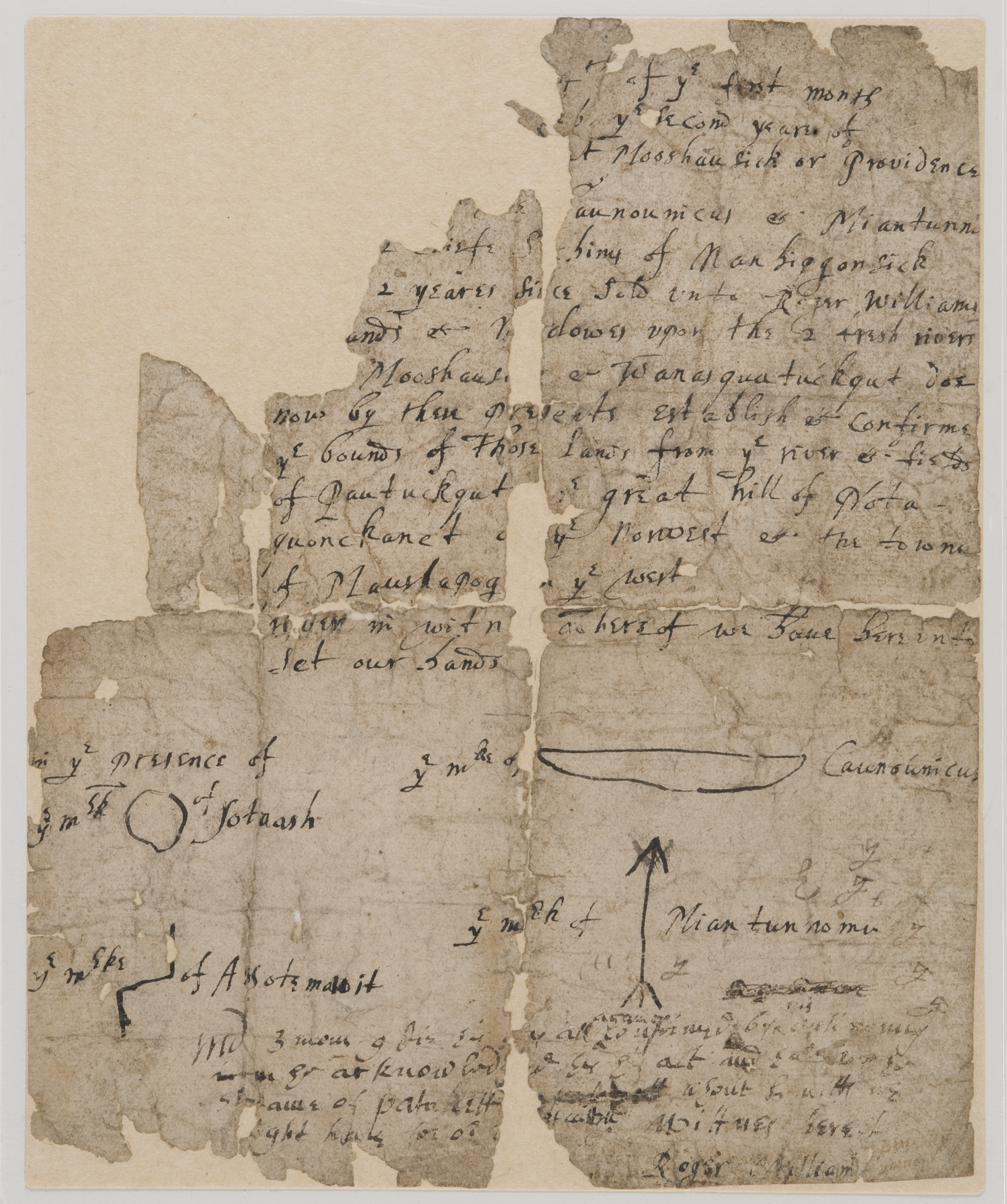
The original 1636 Indian deed creating the Colony of Rhode Island signed by Native American Chief Canonicus to Roger Williams

In the transfer of real estate, a deed conveys ownership from the old owner (the grantor) to the new owner (the grantee).

=== General and special warranty deeds ===
Deeds for real estate transfer can include various warranties. The precise name and nature of these warranties differ by jurisdiction. Often, however, the basic differences between them is the degree to which the grantor warrants the title. The grantor may give a general warranty of title against any claims, or the warranty may be limited to only claims which occurred after the grantor obtained the real estate. The latter type of deed is usually known as a special warranty deed. While a general warranty deed was normally used for residential real estate sales and transfers, special warranty deeds are becoming more common and are more commonly used in commercial transactions.

=== Bargain and sale deed ===
A third type of deed, known as a bargain and sale deed, implies that the grantor has the right to convey title but makes no warranties against encumbrances. This type of deed is most commonly used by court officials or fiduciaries that hold the property by force of law rather than title, such as properties seized for unpaid taxes and sold at sheriff's sale, or an executor.

=== Quitclaim deed ===
A so-called quitclaim deed is (in most jurisdictions) actually not a deed at all, but an estoppel disclaiming rights of the person signing it to property.

=== Deed of trust ===
In some jurisdictions, a deed of trust is used as an alternative to a mortgage. A deed of trust is not used to transfer property directly. It is commonly used in some states — California, for example — to transfer title to land to a “trustee”, usually a trust or title company, which holds the title as security ("in escrow") for a loan. When the loan is paid off, title is transferred to the borrower by recording a release of the obligation, and the trustee's contingent ownership is extinguished. Otherwise, upon default, the trustee will liquidate the property with a new deed and offset the lender's loss with the proceeds.

=== Deeds as alternatives to bankruptcy ===
- Deed of arrangement – document setting out an arrangement for a debtor to pay part or all outstanding debts, as an alternative to bankruptcy; (Australian law).
- Deed of assignment – document in which a debtor appoints a trustee to take charge of property to pay debts, partly or wholly, as an alternative to bankruptcy; (Australian law).

=== Sanad ===
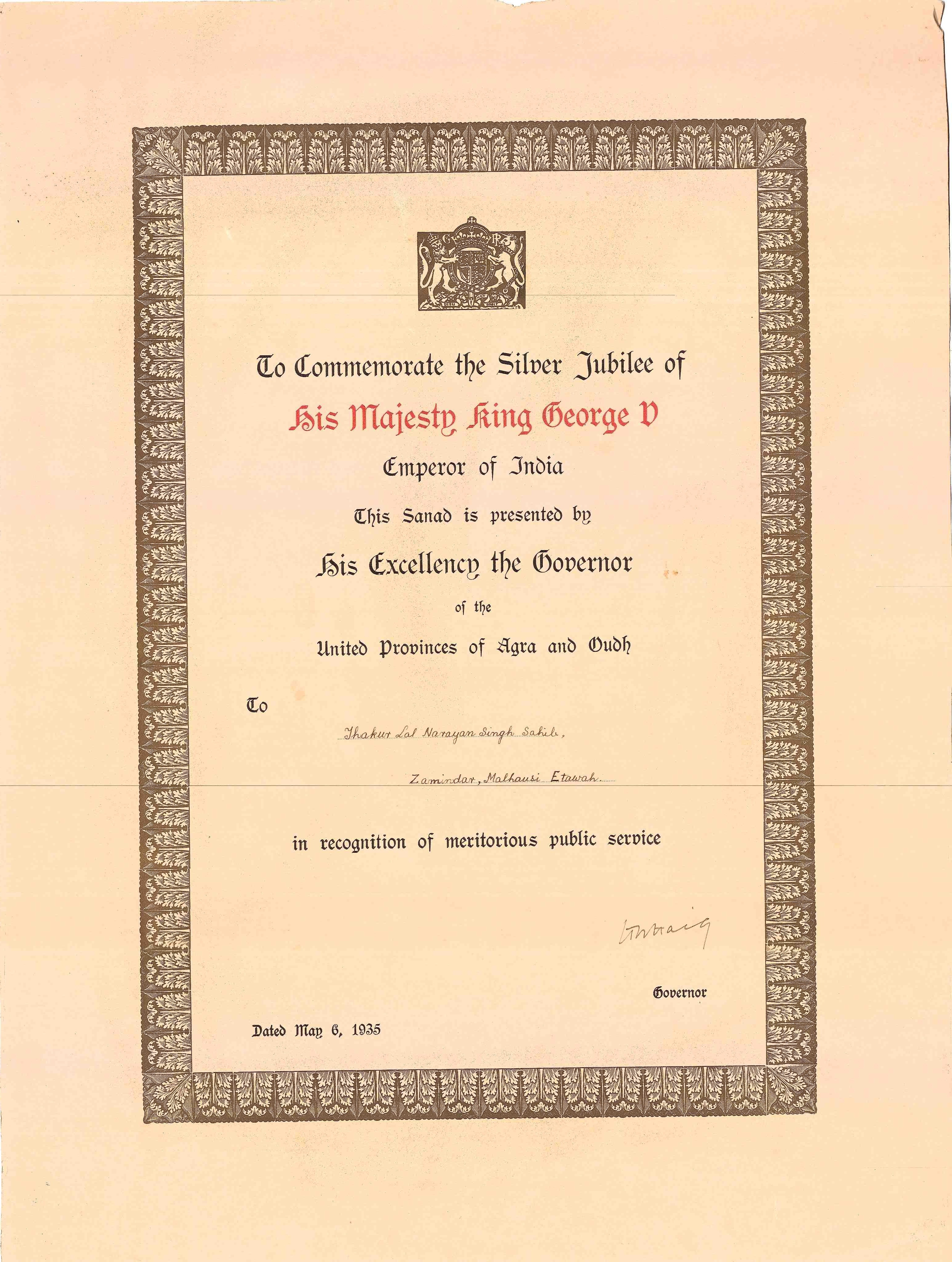
A sanad issued by the governor of the United Provinces of Agra and Oudh during the British Raj

Sanad, also spelt as sunnud, was a deed granted to the rulers of native princely states in British India confirming them in their ruling position in return for their allegiance to the British Raj.

==== Sanad of adoption ====
Since the extinction of the royal bloodline would be a ground for annexation of a principality by the British, some rulers were also granted sanads of adoption. Devised as a reward for loyalty to British rule in India, especially after the Indian rebellion of 1857, such deeds gave a ruler the right to adopt chosen heirs from local noble families in case of lack of direct issue. Among the rulers that were given sanads of adoption, Takht Singh, Jaswant Singh of Bharatpur, as well as the rulers of Nagod State, Samthar State and the Chaube Jagirs are worth mentioning.

== Structure of a deed ==
The main clauses of a deed of conveyance are:

- Premises
  - Parties clause – sets out the names, addresses, and descriptions (vendor/purchaser, grantor/grantee, transferor/transferee) of parties
  - Recitals – narrates in chronological order the previous ownership of the property being conveyed, starting with the earliest deed of title down to the contract of sale the conveyance gives effect to
  - Testatum – a command to witness which acknowledges the payment and receipt of the consideration and signals the beginning of the operative part; usually begins with "Now this Deed witnesseth"
- Operative part
  - Operative clause – vendor gives effect to the contract of sale by conveying his interest in land to the purchaser
  - Parcels clause – clause detailing the location and description of the property being conveyed
  - Habendum – clause indicating the estate (freehold, etc.) or interest to be taken by the grantee
  - Tenendum – "to have and to hold", formerly referring to the tenure by which the estate granted was to be held, though now completely symbolic
  - Reddendum – reserves something to grantor out of thing granted, such as rent, under the formula "yielding and paying".
  - Conditions
  - Warranty – grantor warrants the title to the grantee
    - general: when the warrant is against all persons
    - special: when it is only against the grantor, his heirs and those claiming under him
  - Covenants – binding limitations or promises
- Conclusion (or eschatocol) – execution and date
  - Testimonium (Scotland: testing clause) – attests to the due execution of a deed or instrument.
    - Examples:
      - England & Wales: In Witness Whereof, the parties to these presents have hereunto set their hands and seals.
      - Ireland: In Witness Whereof the parties hereto have hereunto set their hands and affixed their seals [the day and year first herein written].
      - Scotland: IN WITNESS WHEREOF these presents, consisting of this and the preceding pages, are subscribed by [me] at [place] on the [day] day of [month] Two thousand and [year] in the presence of [name] of [address].

== Recording ==
Usually the transfer of ownership of real estate is registered at a cadastre in the United Kingdom. In most parts of the United States, deeds must be submitted to the recorder of deeds, who acts as a cadastre, to be registered. An unrecorded deed may be valid proof of ownership between the parties, but may have no effect upon third-party claims until disclosed or recorded. A local statute may prescribe a period beyond which unrecorded deeds become void as to third parties, at least as to intervening acts.

=== Joint ownership ===
Ownership transfer may also be crafted within deeds to pass by demise, as where a property is held in concurrent estate such as "joint tenants with right of survivor-ship" (JTWROS) or "tenants by the entirety". In each case, the title to the property immediately and automatically vests in the named survivor(s) upon the death of the other tenant(s).

In most states joint tenancy with the right of survivor-ship requires all owners to have equal interests in the property, meaning upon sale or partition of the property, all owners would receive an equal distribution of the proceeds.

Joint ownership may also be by tenants in common (TIC). In some states, joint ownership is presumed to be as tenants in common unless the parties are married and the deed so states or the deed sets for joint tenants with right of survivor-ship. Upon death, the decedent's share passes to his or her estate.

A life estate is the right to use, possess and enjoy the property for a period of time measured by the natural life of a person or persons. When all life tenants are dead, the remainder-man holds full title.

=== Joint tenants with rights of survivor-ship vs. joint tenants in common ===
When deeds are taken as joint tenants with rights of survivor-ship (JTWROS) or joint tenants in common (TIC), any co-owner can file a petition for partition to dissolve the tenancy relationship. JTWROS deed holders always take the property in equal shares; therefore, if the partnership is dissolved through partition, the proceeds must be equally distributed between all of the co-owners without regard to how much each co-owner contributed to the purchase price of the property. No credits would be allowed for any excess contributions to the purchase price. For example, if A and B co-own property as JTWROS and A contributed 80% of the purchase price, A and B would still receive equal distributions upon partition. On the other hand, TIC deed holders may be granted at partition a credit for unequal contributions to purchase price. During either partition, credits may be awarded to any co-owner who may have contributed in excess of his share to the property expenses after taking deed to the property. Credits may be allowed for utilities and maintenance; however, credits for improvements may not be allowed unless the improvements actually added substantial value to the property.

=== Pardon as deed ===
In the United States, a pardon of the President was once considered to be a deed and thus needed to be accepted by the recipient. This made it impossible to grant a pardon posthumously. However, in the case of Henry Ossian Flipper, this view was altered when President Bill Clinton pardoned him in 1999.

=== Title deed ===
Germany operates a 'property register'. Title deeds are documents showing ownership, as well as rights, obligations, or mortgages on the property. Since around 2000, compulsory registration has been required for all properties mortgaged or transferred. The details of rights, obligations, and covenants referred to in deeds will be transferred to the register, a contract describing the property ownership.

=== Difference between a deed and an agreement ===
The main difference between a deed and an agreement is that the deed is generally signed by only one person / party. Examples of a deed are deeds of hyphenation for creating charge on movable properties in favor of the banks/financial institutions etc.

An agreement by its name suggests that there should be at least two parties signing/approving the same. Examples of an agreement are agreement to sale, loan agreement etc.

At common law, ownership was proven via an unbroken chain of title deeds. The Torrens title system is an alternative way of proving ownership. First introduced in South Australia in 1858 by Sir Robert Torrens and adopted later by the other Australian states and other countries, ownership under Torrens title is proven by possession of a certificate of title and the corresponding entry in the property register. This system removes risks associated with unregistered deeds and fraudulent or otherwise incorrect transactions. It is much easier and cheaper to administer, lowering transaction costs. Some Australian properties are still conveyed using a chain of title deeds – usually properties that have been owned by the same family since the nineteenth century – and these are often referred to as 'Old System' deeds.

=== Wild deeds ===
A deed that is recorded, but is not connected to the chain of title of the property, is called a wild deed. A wild deed does not provide constructive notice to later purchasers of the property, because subsequent bona fide purchasers cannot reasonably be expected to locate the deed while investigating the chain of title to the property. Haupt has stated that

Because title searching relies on the grantor/grantee indexes, it's possible that a deed won't be discovered even though it was recorded. "Example: Atwood sells his land to Burns, but Burns does not record his deed. Burns later sells the land to Cooper, and Cooper records her deed. But because the previous deed (the deed from Atwood to Burns) was not recorded, Cooper's deed is outside the chain of title. In a title search, someone looking up Atwood's name in the grantor index would find no indication that Atwood conveyed the property, and nothing would lead the searcher to Cooper's deed." A deed that is outside the chain of title is called a wild deed. The general rule is that a subsequent purchaser is not held to have constructive notice of a wild deed. In the example, Cooper's title is unprotected against subsequent good faith purchasers. Suppose Atwood were to fraudulently sell the same property to another person, Dunn. A court would rule that Dunn has good title to the property, not Cooper.

A wild deed has been described as a deed "executed by a stranger to the record title hung out in the air like Mahomet's coffin". Mahomet is an archaic spelling of Muhammad. There is a legend that the Prophet Muhammad's coffin was suspended without visible support from the ceiling of his tomb, just as a wild deed just hangs there, not touching the chain of title.

== See also ==
- Certificate of occupancy (land tenure)
- Covenant (law)
- Deed of settlement
- Deed poll
- Grant deed
- Quitclaim deed
- Warranty deed
