= Nati (surname) =

Nati is an Italian surname. Notable people with the surname include:

- Germano Nati (1946–2008), Eritrean politician
- Kimiora Nati (born 1988), New Zealand rugby league player
- Romolo Nati (born 1968), Italian architect and businessman
- Valerio Nati (born 1956), Italian professional boxer
