= Certificate of occupancy (land tenure) =

In several countries, a certificate of occupancy is a legal document that gives the holder certain rights to land. These can be a part of land reform processes. In Tanzania, for example, they are equivalent to 33-year leases and grant the holder the ability to mortgage the property. In Nigeria, all land is vested in the government under the Land Use Act of 1978, and certificates of occupancy are equivalent to 99-year leases entitling the holder to occupy the land. Mechanisms similar to certificates of occupancy include temporary occupancy permits (Botswana), certificates of land use (Thailand), and preemptive certificates (Thailand).

== See also ==
- Deed
