= Post-harvest losses =

Post-harvest losses may refer to:

- Post-harvest losses (vegetables)
- Post-harvest losses (grains)
