= Natas (computer virus) =

DOS computer virus

Malware details
- Technical name: Natas
- Type: Computer virus
- Isolation date: May 1992
- Origin: United States
- Author: James Gentile

Technical details
- Platform: DOS

Natas (Satan spelled backwards) is a computer virus written by James Gentile, a then-18-year-old hacker from San Diego, California who went by the alias of "Little Loc" and later "Priest". The virus was made for a Mexican politician who wanted to win the Mexican elections by affecting all the Mexican Federal Electoral Institute (IFE) computers with a floppy disk.

== Description ==
Natas is a memory-resident stealth virus and is highly polymorphic, that affects master boot records, boot sectors of diskettes, files .COM and also .exe programs.

== History ==
The virus first appeared in Mexico City in May 1992, spread by a consultant using infected floppy disks. The virus became widespread in Mexico and the southwest United States. The virus also made its way to the other side of the US, infecting computers at the United States Secret Service knocking their network offline for approximately three days. This led to an investigation of Priest and incorrect suspicion that the virus specifically targeted government computers.

Natas also infected computers in Canada, England, Russian Federation, Venezuela and Brazil.

== See also ==
- Computer virus
