= Natta (surname) =

Natta is a surname. Notable people with the surname include:

- Alessandro Natta (1918–2001), Italian politician
- Camille Natta (born 1977), French actress
- Giulio Natta (1903–1979), Italian chemist and Nobel laureate
- Mark Natta (born 2002), Australian soccer player
- Yumi Natta (born 1969), Japanese volleyball player

== See also ==
- Van Natta, surname
