= Dungeon Explorer =

Dungeon Explorer may refer to:

- Dungeon Explorer (1989 video game), developed by Atlus
- Dungeon Explorer (1995 video game), developed by Hudson Soft and Westone
- Dungeon Explorer II, developed by Hudson Soft
- Dungeon Explorer: Warriors of Ancient Arts, developed by Hudson Soft
