= Boukoumbé =

Boukoumbé Boukombé
- Commune
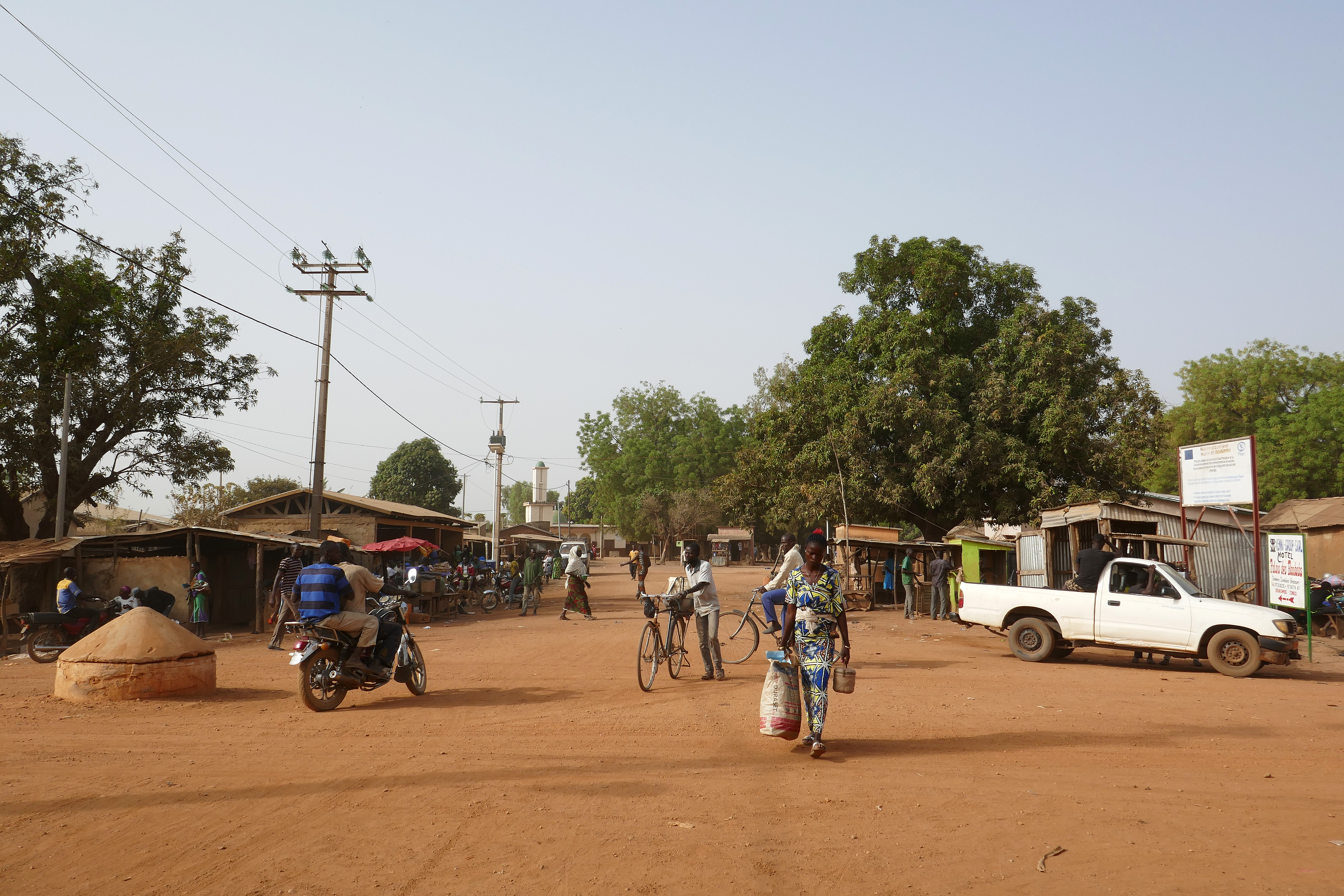

- Location in Benin
- Coordinates: 10°11′N 1°06′E
- Country: Benin
- Department: Atakora Department

Area
  - Total: 1,036 km^{2} (400 sq mi)
- Elevation: 223 m (732 ft)

Population (2013 census)
  - Total: 83,147
- Time zone: UTC+1 (WAT)

Boukoumbé ([bu.kum.be]), or colloquially Boukombé ([bu.kɔ̃.be]), is a commune of Atakora Department in northwestern Benin, on the border with Togo. It consists of 71 villages and urban districts organised into 7 arrondissements (including an arrondissement also named Boukoumbé). The commune is ethnically and religiously diverse, with the indigenous Somba people known for their unique traditional dwellings and cultural celebrations.

== Geography ==
The commune covers an area of 1,036 square kilometres and is situated less than 50 km southwest of Natitingou, the departmental capital. It borders the country of Togo to the west and south, and the communes of Tanguiéta and Natitingou to the north and east, respectively.

The commune is traversed by the Atakora mountain range, which includes the nearby Kousso-Kovangou Mountain, the highest point of Benin, peaking at 823 metres above sea level. The commune has a tropical climate with a pronounced rainy season from April to October and a dry season characterised by Harmattan winds from November to March.

== Administration ==
Boukoumbé is subdivided into 7 arrondissements: Boukoumbè, Dipoli, Korontière, Kossoucoingou, Manta, Natta, and Tabota. They contain 55 villages and 16 urban districts. The commune is led by Mayor Aldo N'Da Kouagou.

== Demographics ==
Boukoumbé has an ethnically diverse population that includes the indigenous Somba people, as well as the Aja, Bariba, Cotocoli, Dendi, Djerma, Fon, Fulani, Gangamba, Lamba, and Yoruba peoples. The populace also practices a variety of religions, with a strong following of local religions, alongside minority groups of Muslims, Catholics, and Protestants.

The indigenous Somba of Boukoumbé are known for their fortified earthen dwellings known as Tata Somba, distinctive dance forms such as Tipenti, and community festivals and rituals tied to births, circumcisions, funerals, weddings, and harvests.

The 2013 census recorded a population of 83,147 in Boukoumbé.

== Economy ==
Most residents are engaged in commercial farming. Cotton is the principal cash crop, but locally grown crops include sorghum, millet, fonio, rice, maize, yams, sweet potatoes, cassava, cowpeas, peanuts, and sesame. The Boukoumbé Market, among the largest in Benin, serves as a regional hub for trade in cereals, legumes, livestock, and traditional goods such as baobab and néré powder. Other economic activities include animal husbandry, artisan crafts, hunting, trade, and tourism.

== Transport ==
Boukoumbé is accessible via a 60-kilometre paved road from Natitingou, completed as part of national infrastructure investments. The road offers travelers stunning vistas and scenic bends as they enter the commune.
