= TechnoServe =

Nonprofit organisation in the USA

- Type: Nonprofit organization
- Founded: 1968
- Founder: Edward P. Bullard
- Headquarters: Washington, D.C., United States
- Area served: 29 countries
- Key people: William Warshauer, President and CEO; Paul E. Tierney Jr., Chairman
- Revenue: 85,197,660 United States dollar (2016)
- Total assets: 102,404,868 United States dollar (2022)
- Number of employees: 1,540
- Website: technoserve.org

TechnoServe is an international nonprofit that promotes business services for poverty in the developing world. It is a registered 501(c)(3) based in Washington, D.C., with over 1,540 employees across 29 countries worldwide.

== History ==
=== Early years ===
TechnoServe was founded in 1968 by businessman and philanthropist Ed Bullard after his experience volunteering at a hospital in rural Ghana. He was inspired to start an organization that would help hardworking people harness the power of private enterprise to lift themselves out of poverty. Bullard launched TechnoServe – short for “technology in the service of mankind” – in 1968 to help poor people by connecting them to information and market opportunities.

In 1969, TechnoServe undertook its first project, assisting the construction of a 2,000 square foot feed mill for the production of poultry and eggs in Honduras. TechnoServe helped locate sources of capital and an experienced feed mill operator to direct the first nine months of operation in order to secure the project’s growth and success.

By 1971, TechnoServe had begun work in several other countries across Latin America, the Caribbean and Africa. These early efforts marked the beginning of what would proliferate into more comprehensive projects across the globe over the next several decades.

== Notable projects ==
=== East Africa Dairy Development ===
Funded by the Bill & Melinda Gates Foundation and implemented in partnership with Heifer International, the East Africa Dairy Development project aims to double the dairy incomes of 179,000 smallholder farm families — or approximately one million men, women and children— in Kenya, Uganda and Rwanda within 10 years. The program facilitates improved dairy production, business practices, and market access by developing chilling plant hubs.

=== The Haiti Hope Project ===
The Haiti Hope Project is a five-year partnership designed to create sustainable economic opportunities for Haitian mango farmers and their families. The project aims to double the incomes of 25,000 smallholder mango farmers five years after they join the project. It is a public-private partnership of The Coca-Cola Company; the Multilateral Investment Fund (MIF), a member of the Inter-American Development Bank (IDB); the U.S. Agency for International Development (USAID); and TechnoServe.

=== Impulsa Tu Empresa ===
With support from the Argidius Foundation, Impulsa Tu Empresa aims to help more than 800 small and medium-sized enterprises develop their business. Through mentoring, business training and business plan competitions, the program aims to increase sales by $13 million and generate 750 new jobs in Guatemala, Honduras, Nicaragua and Burkina Faso.

=== Project Nurture ===
A partnership with The Coca-Cola Company and the Bill & Melinda Gates Foundation, Project Nurture is a five-year project that aims to help more than 50,000 small-scale mango and passion fruit farmers in Kenya and Uganda double their fruit incomes. In addition to identifying new market opportunities, TechnoServe advisors are working with farmers to improve productivity and develop strong farmer business groups.

=== Strengthening Rural Youth Development Through Enterprise ===
TechnoServe and the Mastercard Foundation have partnered on an $11.5 million, four-year program beginning in 2011 to help rural young women and men in East Africa transition to economic independence. The Strengthening Rural Youth Development through Enterprise (STRYDE) program delivers a comprehensive package of services including skills training, business development and mentoring to young people ages 18 to 30 in Kenya, Rwanda and Uganda, aiming to assist 15,000 people by the end of the program.

=== Technical Assistance Facility ===
TechnoServe serves as the manager of the Technical Assistance Facility (TAF), which supports the African Agriculture Fund, a private equity fund, to address food security challenges across Africa. TAF provides technical assistance to small- and medium-sized enterprises invested in by the African Agriculture Fund, and improves linkages between enterprises and smallholder outgrowers.
