= Dagaaba people =

Ethnic group in West Africa

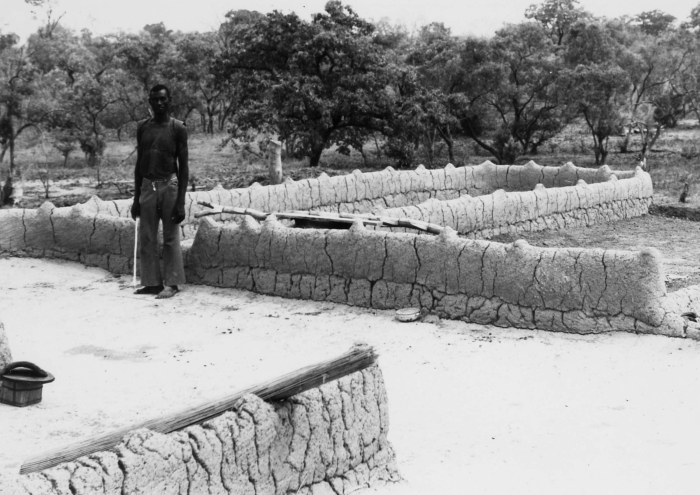
- Dagaaba man in front of traditional architecture, 1979

Total population
- 700,000 in Ghana; 388,000 in Burkina Faso

Regions with significant populations
- Primarily native to northern Ghana and southern Burkina Faso. Diaspora present in southern Ghana

Languages
- Dagaare language and dialects, English, French

Religion
- African traditional religion; Islam; Christianity

Related ethnic groups
- Birifor people

The Dagaaba people (singular Dagao, and, in northern dialects, Dagara for both plural and singular) are an ethnic group inhabiting north of the convergence of Ghana, Burkina Faso and Côte d'Ivoire. They primarily rely on small-scale agricultural farming plots and speak the Dagaare language, which consists of several dialects. There are over a million Dagaaba people across West Africa.

== Etymology ==
One historian, describing the former usage of "Dagarti" to refer to this community by colonials, writes: "The name 'Dagarti' appears to have been coined by the first Europeans to visit the region, from the vernacular root dagaa. Correctly 'Dagaari' is the name of the language, 'Dagaaba' or 'Dagara' that of the people, and 'Dagaw' or 'Dagawie' that of the land."

== Geographic distribution ==
Although sometimes divided into Northern and Southern Dagaare speakers, their combined population was estimated in 2003 at over one million spread across the Northwest corner of Ghana and Sud-Ouest Region in Southwestern Burkina Faso. The Southern Dagaare are a people of around 700,000 living in the western part of Upper West Region. The Northern Dagaare speakers, with an estimated population of 388,000 (in 2001) live primarily in Ioba Province, but also in Poni, Bougouriba, Sissili, and Mouhoun provinces. In Ghana, several waves of internal migration, beginning with the demand for labour in mines and cocao farms in the early 20th century, have brought a sizable Dagaaba population to towns in the southern part of the nation, notably Brong Ahafo Region. In modern Ghana, the Dagaaba homeland of the Upper West Region includes the Districts and towns of Nandom, Lawra, Jirapa, Kaleo, Papu, Nadowli, Daffiama, Wechiau and Hamile. Large communities are also found in the towns of Wa, Bogda, Babile, Tuna, Han, Zambo, and Nyoli.

== History ==
The source of Dagaaba communities in the pre-colonial era remain a point of debate. The evidence of oral tradition is that the Dagaaba are an outgrowth of the Mole-Dagbani group which migrated to the semi-arid Sahel region in the fourteenth century CE. They are believed to have further migrated to the lower northern part of the region in the seventeenth century. From well before the appearance of Europeans, the Dagaaba lived in small-scale agricultural communities, not centralised into any large state-like structure. Ethnological studies point to oral literature which tells that the Dagaaba periodically, and ultimately successfully, resisted attempts at conquest by states in the south of modern Ghana, as well as the Kingdoms of Dagbon, Mamprugu and Gonja in the north. One thesis based on oral evidence is that the Dagaaba formed as a break away faction of Dagbon under Na Nyagse. The colonial borders, demarcated during the Scramble for Africa, placed them in northwestern Ghana and southern Burkina Faso, as well as small populations in Ivory Coast.

=== Extra-community relations ===
Dagaaba communities have occasionally come into conflict with neighbouring groups, especially over land rights, as recently as the 1980s with the Sisala people and at earlier times with the Wala people. The latter, in alliance with the Wassoulou Empire of Diola Samory Toure, conquered much of Dagawie in the late 1890s, under the generalship of Sarankye Mori but was later defeated by the kaleo naa

Some of the southernmost Dagaaba villages were in the early 1890s under the authority of the Kingdom of Wala but then rebelled in 1894 and asserted their independence. They were however restored to the domains of the Wala Native Authority by the British in 1933.

== Society ==
Within the Dagawie homelands, the Dagaaba have traditionally formed sedentary agricultural communities. Modern Dagaaba lineages consist of ten clans encompassing over one million people.

=== Traditional politics ===
Traditional Dagaaba communities are based on the "Yir" subclan or household group, a series of which are clustered into the "Tengan", an earth deity shrine area. The Tengan system, a constellation of roles usually inherited within the same household group, is called the tendaalun. The head of these shrine area systems, the tengan sob (sometimes tindana) fulfilled the role of community elder and priest, along with the tengan dem, the ritual custodian and maintainer of the ritual center. Other priestly/elder roles within the tendaalun include the suo sob who performs ritual animal slaughter to the earth deity, the zongmogre who performs rituals at the sacred market centres, and the gara dana or wie sob who is ritual leader among hunting societies. These remain living forms of community in much of Dagaaba society, and influence, among other things, the community perception of land as held in spiritual custodianship, and different community resources falling under the custodianship of different authorities, lineages, and/or spiritual forces.

Until the latter part of the nineteenth century when institutional chieftaincy evolved (and was later imposed by colonial administration), broader Dagaaba communities functioned under a system of councils of elders.

Some Dagaaba communities maintain traditional ceremonial chieftainships, sometimes contesting. As recently as 2006, the "Council of Elders" of the Dagaaba community of Ghana attempted to unite various factions with the appointment of Naa Franklin Suantah, Principal Librarian of the Saint Louis Training College of Kumasi as chief of the Dagaaba community in Ghana.

=== Culture ===
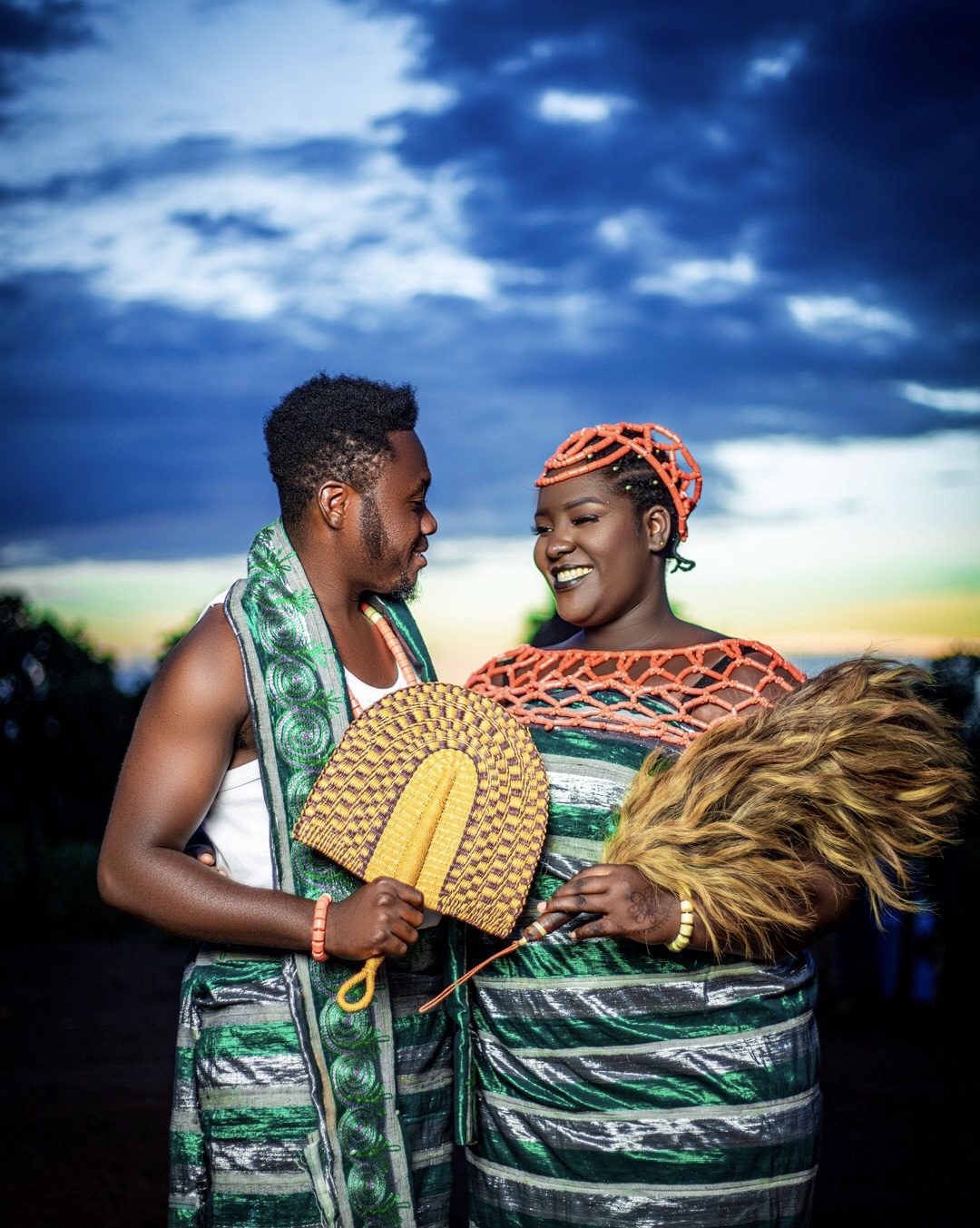
Dagaaba bride and groom with traditional attire

The Dagaaba, before the influence of the colonialist, were self-reliant in iron production and were very successful in mixed crops farming. They also developed sophisticated musical instruments including gyle (xylophones). The Dagaaba people are well known in a local beer making known as dāā Dagadāā, popularly called Pito.

=== Economics ===
Communities in Dagaaba homelands remain primarily small-scale agricultural, with family farming plots tilled by the family themselves. In the modern era, off-farm wage income is often used to supplement trade income and subsistence from farming. Fishing communities of Dagaaba persist along the Black Volta, a de facto boundary of Dagaaba lands. Because the communities are found along historic coast-to-Sahel trade routes, trade has long been an important occupation, but largely in local goods. Markets in larger towns are on Sundays, with others on a six-day cycle.

Some contemporary Dagaaba communities of northern Ghana are notable as the last West African communities to still use Cowrie shells as currency, alongside the modern Ghanaian cedi. Cowrie are used not only for traditional ornamental and ceremonial purposes (as other West African communities do), but also as an inflation proof form of internal savings and as a safe medium to trade across national (and currency) boundaries which may divide Dagaaba communities.

=== Oral literature ===
Oral literature has a long tradition with Dagaaba communities, and remains a living vehicle of education and acculturation in Dagaaba society. There are two main types of literature in Dagaaba society. They can broadly be categorized as secular literature consisting of stories, tales, proverbs and other oral genre and the sacred literature produced during ritual and religious services. The most important of these are bagr mythical narratives recitations and orations produced during initiation rituals and other religious services.

=== Religion ===
Dagaaba communities historically have practiced traditional religions, as well as Islam and Christianity. The Ghanaian Dagaaba have traditionally had a Cousinage/Joking relationship with the Frafra (Gurunsi) people.

The Dagaaba traditionally recognize the presence of Naaŋmene (supreme god) and Teŋgan (earth deity), among other deities. They believe rivers serve as the abode of deities and such supernatural beings can interact directly with the living. Blasphemy towards deities, especially Teŋgan, is believed to cause instant warnings, sickness, plague, and in extreme situations, death among civilians. Rivers, trees, hills, and animals, including the cow, awl, dove, and mud fish are believed to hold spiritual essence or power.

== Languages ==
They speak the Dagaare language, made up of Northern Dagara and Dagaari Dioula, both mainly spoken in Burkina Faso, as well as Southern Dagaare which is mainly spoken in Ghana, according to Ethnologue. Dagaare, Dagara, Waale (Southern Dagaare) and Birifor are four major dialects of the Dagaare language.

In northern areas, both the language and the people are referred to as Dagara. These languages share the autonym Dagaare (also spelled and/or pronounced as Dagaari, Dagarti, Dagara, or Dagao), and historically some non-natives have taken this as the name of the people.

Dagaare shares close similarites to other Gur languages of the Niger-Congo language family, such as Dagbanli, Mooré, Mampruli, and Kusaal.

== Bibliography ==
- Nuobepuor, Titus (4 June 2025). "The Dagaaba Traditional Belief System: A Documentary for Posterity". MSI Publishers. doi:10.5281/ZENODO.15590194.
