= Mampruli language =

Gur language of northern Ghana

Mampruli
- Ŋmampulli, Ŋmampurili
- Native to: Ghana, Togo, Burkina Faso, Ivory Coast, Mali
- Ethnicity: Mamprusi people
- Native speakers: 230,000 (2004)
- Language family: Niger–Congo?: Atlantic–Congo; Gur; Northern; Oti–Volta; Western-Oti/Volta; Southeastern; Mampruli

Language codes
- ISO 639-3: maw
- Glottolog: mamp1244

- People: Mamprusi
- Language: Mampruli
- Country: Mamprugu

The Mampruli language is a Gur language spoken in northern Ghana, Northern Togo, Burkina Faso, Ivory Coast and Mali by the Mamprusi people. It is partially mutually intelligible with Dagbani. The Mamprusi language is spoken in a broad belt across the northern parts of the Northern Region of Ghana, stretching west to east from Yizeesi to Nakpanduri and centred on the towns of Gambaga, Nalerigu and Walewale.

The language belongs to the Gur family which is part of the Niger–Congo language family, which covers most of Sub-Saharan Africa (Bendor-Samuel 1989). Within Gur it belongs to the Western Oti–Volta subgroup, and particularly its southeastern cluster of six to eight languages (Naden 1988, 1989). Closely related and very similar languages spoken nearby are Dagbani, Nanun, Kamara and Hanga in the Northern Region, and Kusaal, Nabit and Talni in the Upper East Region. Not quite so closely related are Farefare, Waali, Dagaari, Birifor and Safalaba in the Upper East and Upper West Regions and southwest of the Northern Region.

Comparatively little linguistic material on the language has been published; there is a brief sketch as an illustration of this subgroup of languages in Naden 1988. A collection of Mampruli proverbs has been published by R.P. Xavier Plissart, and a translation of the New Testament is in print, a sample of which can be read and heard online. There are also beginning Mampruli lessons in which the spoken language can be heard.

== Names ==
The general and accepted name for the language is Mampruli. The name Mamprusi Is mostly used to refer to the ethnic group who speak the language, and it is not accepted by native speakers to refer to the language.

== Other countries ==
Mampruli is also spoken at the border in the Savanes Region of Togo, across the Ghanaian border. It is also spoken by some emigrated communities in parts of Burkina Faso, Ivory Coast, and Mali.

== Dialects ==
There is comparatively little dialect variation. The western (Walewale to the White Volta) and Far Western (west of the White Volta, area have some variant pronunciation standards. The far Eastern dialect (Durili) is most notable for pronouncing [r] and [l] where the rest of Mampruli pronounces [l] and [r] respectively, and for some characteristic intonation patterns.

== Phonology ==
=== Vowels ===
Mampruli has ten phonemic vowels: five short and five long vowels:

	Front		Central		Back	
	short	long	short	long	short	long
High	i	iː			u	uː
Mid	e	eː			o	oː
Low			a	aː		

=== Consonants ===
		Labial	Alveolar	Palatal	Velar	Labial-velar
Nasal		m	n	ɲ	ŋ	ŋ͡m
Plosive	Voiceless	p	t		k	k͡p
Plosive	Voiced	b	d		ɡ	ɡ͡b
Fricative	Voiceless	f	s			
Fricative	Voiced	v	z			
Lateral			l			
Approximant		ʋ	r	j		

== Writing system ==
Mampruli is written in an orthography based on the Latin alphabet, with the addition of the letters ɛ, ŋ, ɔ. The literacy rate is fairly low. The orthography currently used represents a number of allophonic distinctions. There is a description of the process of formulating the orthography.

=== Alphabet ===
a	aa	b	d	e	ɛ	ee	f	g	'	gb	gy	h	i	k	kp	ky	l	m	n	ny	ŋ	ŋm	o	ɔ	oo	p	r	s	t	u	uu	w	y	z	’

== Grammar ==
Mampruli has a fairly conservative Oti-Volta grammatical system. The constituent order in Mampruli sentences is usually agent–verb–object. There is a simple, non-technical grammatical study.

== Lexicon ==
The rather unusual trilingual (Mampruli-Spanish-English) dictionary was superseded by the more-reliable simple glossary: a full-featured Mampruli dictionary is in course of preparation. A hundred-word sample can be seen on the Kamusi project site
