= Dagaare language =

Language

Dagaare
- Native to: Ghana, Burkina Faso
- Ethnicity: Dagaaba people
- Native speakers: (1.3 million cited 1999–2021)
- Language family: Niger–Congo?: Atlantic–Congo; Gur; Northern; Oti–Volta; Moré–Dagbani; Moré; Dagaare
- Dialects: Lober; Nura; Wule
- Writing system: Latin (Dagaare alphabet); Dagaare Braille

Language codes
- ISO 639-3: Variously: dga – Southern Dagaare dgd – Dagaari Dioula dgi – Northern Dagara
- Glottolog: sout2789 Central Dagaare daga1272 Dagaari Dioula nort2780 Northern Dagara
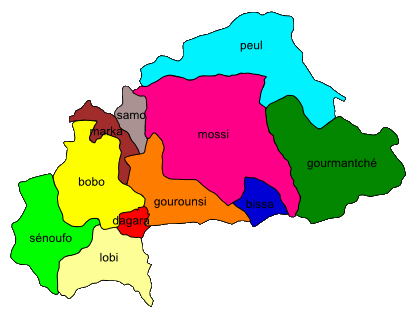
- Majority areas of Northern Dagara speakers, in red, on a map of Burkina Faso.

Dagaare is the language of the Dagaaba people of Ghana and Burkina Faso. It has been described as a dialect continuum that also includes Waale and Birifor. Dagaare language varies in dialect stemming from other family languages including: Dagbane, Waale, Mabia, Gurene, Mampruli, Kusaal, Buli, Niger-Congo, and many other sub languages resulting in around 1.3 million Dagaare speakers. Throughout the regions of native Dagaare speakers the dialect comes from Northern, Central, Western, and Southern areas referring to the language differently. Burkina Faso refers to Dagaare as Dagara and Birifor to natives in the Republic of Côte d'Ivoire. The native tongue is still universally known as Dagaare. Amongst the different dialects, the standard for Dagaare is derived from the Central region's dialect. Southern Dagaare (or Waale) also stems from the Dagaare language and is known to be commonly spoken in Wa and Kaleo.

Ethnologue divides Dagaare into three languages:

- Southern/Central Dagaare language, which is spoken mainly in Ghana
- Northern Dagara language, which is spoken mainly in Burkina Faso
- Dagaari Dioula, which is spoken mainly in Burkina Faso, and has significant influence from the genetically unrelated Dioula language
  Distribution of Dagaree Speakers

== Orthography ==
Dagara alphabet (Burkina Faso)
Uppercase
A	B	Ɓ	C	D	E	Ɛ	F	G	Gb	H	ʼH	I	Ɩ	J	K	Kp	L	ʼL	M	N	Ny	Ŋ	Ŋm	O	Ɔ	P	R	S	T	U	Ʋ	V	W	ʼW	Y	Ƴ	Z
Lowercase
a	b	ɓ	c	d	e	ɛ	f	g	gb	h	ʼh	i	ɩ	j	k	kp	l	ʼl	m	n	ny	ŋ	ŋm	o	ɔ	p	r	s	t	u	ʋ	v	w	ʼw	y	ƴ	z

Tones are indicated using diacritics:

- the grave accent for the low tone: ⟨à è ɛ̀ ì ɩ̀ ò ɔ̀ ù ʋ̀⟩ ;
- the acute accent for the high tone: ⟨á é ɛ́ í ɩ́ ó ɔ́ ú ʋ́⟩ ;
- and no accent for the middle tone.

Nasalization is indicated using the tilde. A nasalized vowel in high or low tone is surmounted by the tilde under the accent.

Dagaare alphabet (Ghana)
Uppercase
A	B	D	E	Ɛ	F	G	H	I	J	K	L	M	N	O	Ɔ	P	R	S	T	U	V	W	Y	Z
Lowercase
a	b	d	e	ɛ	f	g	h	i	j	k	l	m	n	o	ɔ	p	r	s	t	u	v	w	y	z

== Phonology ==
The consonant and vowel sounds in the Dagaare languages:

=== Vowels ===
	Front	Central	Back
Close	i		u
Near-close	ɪ		ʊ
Close-mid	e		o
Open-mid	ɛ		ɔ
Open		a	

=== Consonants ===
		Labial	Alveolar	(Alveolo-) Palatal	Velar	Labio- velar	Glottal
Nasal	plain	m	n	ɲ	ŋ	ŋ͡m	
Nasal	glottalized	ˀm					
Plosive/ Affricate	voiceless	p	t	t͡ɕ	k	k͡p	ʔ
Plosive/ Affricate	voiced	b	d	d͡ʑ	ɡ	ɡ͡b	
Fricative	voiceless	f	s				h
Fricative	voiced	v	z				
Fricative	glottalized						ˀh
Approximant	plain		l	j		w	
Approximant	glottalized		ˀl				

Allophones of /d/, /ɡ/ include [r] and [ɡ̆] or possibly [ɟ̆].

Ghanaian Dagaare has twenty-five consonants and two glides (semi-vowels). Glottalized /ˀh/, /ˀl/, and /ˀm/ occur in the northern dialect of Burkina Faso.

== Grammar ==
=== Tone ===
Dagaare is a tonal language with a two-level tone system with a downstep high tone. The Dagaare tone has two basic functions, namely a lexical and a grammatical function. Its lexical function concerns differences in lexical semantics, such that differing in tone but not in morphosyntactic form triggers different semantics. Its grammatical function is responsible for cases in which different tone markings on a segment result in different semantics of that expression.

==== Lexical function ====
Bá
„to go very fast“

Bà
„to fix the ground“

==== Grammatical function ====
Ò kùŋ gáá.
3.SG NEG.FUT come.PERF
„S/he will not go.“ (negative declarative sentence)

Ò kúŋ gáá.
3.SG NEG.HORT come.PERF
„S/he should not go.“ (negative hortative sentence)

=== Noun class system ===
Noun Class	Singular Form	Noun Stem	Plural Form
Class I	[-Vocal]		[-bɔ']
(+human cl.)	pɔ'ɤɔ' ('woman')	pɔ'g-	pɔ'ɤíbɔ' ('women')
Class II	[-Vocal]		[-rí]
IIa	[-é]		[-rí]
	bìé ('child')	bì-	bíírí ('children')
IIb	[-ó]		[-rí]
	dùó ('pig')	dò-	dòrí ('pigs')
IIc	[-í]		[-rí]
	síɤí ('hut')	síg-	síɤrí ('huts')
Class III	[-í]		[-Vocal]
IIIa	[-í]		[-é]
	gyìlí ('xylophone')	gyìl-	gyìlé ('xylophones')
IIIb	[-í]		[-ɔ']
	pɔ'lí ('path')	pɔ'-	pɔ'lɔ' ('paths')
IIIc	[-í]		[-á]
	váálí ('rubbish')	váál-	váálá ('rubbish')
Class IV	[-rʊʊ]		[-rì]
	pírʊʊ ('sheep')	pí-	píírì ('sheep')
Class V	[-∅]		[-rí]
	túú ('forest')	tùù-	túúrí ('forest')
Class VI	[-rì]		[-Vocal]
VIa	[-rì]		[-è]
	bírì ('seed')	bí-	bíè ('seeds')
VIb	[-rí]		[-ó]
	tóórí ('ear')	tóó-	tòbó ('ears')
VIc	[-rí]		[-á]
	yàgrí ('cheek')	yàg-	yàɤá ('cheeks')
Class VII	Nasal+Vocal		Nasal+Vocal
VIIa	[-ní]		[-mà]
	gání ('book')	gán-	gámà ('books')
VIIb	[-mʊ]		[-má]
	táamʊ ('bow')	tàn-	támá ('bows')
VIIc	[-ŋé]		[-ní]
	bìŋé ('pen')	bìŋ-	bìnní ('pens')
VIId	[-ŋó]		[-ní]
	bòŋó ('donkey')	bòŋ-	bònní ('donkeys')
VIIe	[-∅]		[-nɛɛ]
-count plurals	dɑ̃ɑ̃' ('pito')	dɑ̃ɑ̃'-	dɑ̃ɑ̃'nɛɛ ('pito')
Class VIII	[-áá]		[-í]
	gbíŋgbíláá ('drying spot')	gbígbíl-	gbíŋgbíllí ('drying spots')
Class IX	[-ù]		(no plural)
(derived n.)	Dúóù ('climbing')	dó-	
Class X	(no singular)		[-úŋ]
		bùùl-	búúlúŋ ('porridge')

=== Pronouns ===
==== Personal pronouns ====
In Dagaare, personal pronouns do not exhibit gender differences. For subject pronouns, there is a distinction between strong and weak personal pronouns. Moreover, there is a distinction between human and non-human forms for third person plural pronouns.

	Subject (Nom)		Object (Acc)
	Weak Form	Strong Form	
(human)			
1st SG	n	maa	ma
2nd SG	fo	foo	fo
3rd SG	o	onɔ	o
1st PL	te	tenee	te
2nd PL	yɛ	yɛnee	yɛ
3rd PL	ba	bana	ba
(non-human)			
3rd PL	a	ana	a

==== Reflexive pronouns ====
Reflexivity is expressed by the words mengɛ or mengɛ tɔr in singular and menne or menne tɔr in plural after any personal pronouns.

Weak reflexive pronouns	Strong reflexive pronouns
n mengɛ (tɔr) ('myself')	maa mengɛ ('me, myself')
fo mengɛ (tɔr) ('yourself')	foo mengɛ ('you, yourself')
o mengɛ (tɔr) ('him-/herself')	onɔ mengɛ ('s/he, him-/herself')
te menne (tɔr) ('ourselves')	tenee menne ('we, ourselves')
yɛ menne (tɔr) ('yourselves')	yɛnee menne ('you, yourselves')
ba menne (tɔr) ('themselves')	bana menne ('they, themselves')
a menne (tɔr) ('themselves', non-human)	ana menne ('they, themselves', non-human)

==== Reciprocal pronouns ====
Reciprocal pronouns in Dagaare consist of the forms tɔ, tɔ soba, taa and taaba. The most common form is taa.

Te nɔnɔ lá taa.
we love FOC RECP
„We love each other / one another.“

==== Relative pronouns ====
There is no distinction between human and non-human relative pronouns in Dagaare. For both the relative pronoun is nang.

A dɔɔ na nang wa.
DEF man COMP who come.PERF
„The man who came.“

A gane na nang le.
DEF book COMP which fall.PERF
„The book that fell down.“

==== Interrogative pronouns ====
Interrogative pronouns are formed by a root like [bo-] ('what, which') which combines with a suffix. Interrogative pronoun roots in Dagaare include also [yeŋ-] ('where'), [ʔaŋ-] ('who') and [wʊla-] ('how many').

Dagaare	English
bong, boluu	what
boo	which one, which of them
baboo, babobo	which of them (human)
aboo, abobo	which of them (non-human)
ang	who (human, singular)
ang mine	who (human, plural)

==== Possessive pronouns ====
Possession is expressed by the words toɔr and den in singular and deme in plural, meaning "own", combined with any personal pronoun.

Dagaare	English
n toɔr, den, deme	mine, my own
fo toɔr, den, deme	yours, your own
o toɔr, den, deme	his/hers, his/her own
te toɔr, den, deme	ours, our own
yɛ toɔr, den, deme	yours, your own
ba toɔr, den, deme	theirs, their own (human)
a toɔr, den, deme	theirs, their own (non-human)

==== Demonstrative pronouns ====
Similarly to the personal pronouns, there is a distinction between human and non-human forms for the third person plural pronouns.

Dagaare	English
nyɛ	this (one)
onɔng	that (one)
banang	those (ones) (human)
anang	those (ones) (non-human)
lɛ	like that (one)
nyɛɛ	like this (one)

==== Indefinite pronouns ====
Dagaare does not seem to have indefinite pronouns and rather combines a noun like "person" or "body" with the element kang in order to express indefinites like "somebody" or "someone".

Neɛ kang wa-ɛ lá.
person INDEF come-PERF FOC
„Someone has come.“

== Syntax ==
=== Word order ===
The canonical word order of Dagaare is SVO (subject-verb-object). This can be seen in the following examples showing an intransitive clause, a transitive clause including an adverb and a ditransitive clause.

Báyúó dà tòng lá tómɔ (zààméng).
Bayuo PST work FOC work yesterday
„Bayuo worked (yesterday).“

Dɛr nyuuri lá a kʊɔ wɪɛʊ.
Dɛr drink.IPFV FOC DEF water quickly
„Dɛr is drinking the water quickly.“

Zeɛmɛ dà kɔ / dà korɔ lá Naapɔge doge.
Ziema PST give.PFV / PST give.IPFV FOC Napog pot
„Ziema gave / is giving Napog a pot.“

=== Verb phrase ===
The VP in Dagaare consists of a preverbal particle encoding tense, the predicate, and a postverbal particle with a function yet to be fully investigated.

==== Preverbal particles ====
Daagare marks past and future tenses by the use of preverbal particles. Present tense is not marked or lexicalized in this language. These preverbal particles function like auxiliary verbs in Indo-European languages lexicalizing tense and aspectual features.

Badɛr dà kpi-e lá.
spider PST die-IPFV FOC
„The spider died.“

O na ngmɛ ma lá.
3.SG FUT beat 1.SG FOC
„S/he will beat me.“

Contrary to Indo-European languages like English, French and Norwegian, Dagaare exhibits the lexicalization of a habitual marker. While in the Indo-European languages this habitual marker is basically an adverb, in Dagaare it is realized as the preverbal particle mang. This preverbal particle can only occur after the subject, thus it is not an adverb, since adverbs are more flexible in the positions they can potentially occur in within the clause.

O mang ngmeɛ-rɛ ma lá yaga.
3.SG HAB beat-IPFV 1.SG FOC plenty
„S/he is always beating me a lot.“

==== Major particles ====
Tense, Aspect, Modal Particles	Dagaare
today (also: once upon a time)	da
one day away	zaa
two or more days away	daar
habitual	mang
still, not yet	nang
actually	sorong
once again, as usual	yaa
suddenly, just	deɛ
nonfuture negative	ba
future affix	na
future negative	kong
imperative subjunctive negative	ta
again	là

These preverbal particles are difficult to classify as temporal, aspectual, modal and polar, since the relationship between polarity and tense in the Mabia languages is very tight. This means that a particular preverbal particle can express a positive or negative action in the past (da) or a positive or negative action in the future (na). The na particle for instance does not only mark tense, but also positivity of an action. Its counterpart kong is not simply the negation of an action, but also indicating the tense of this action.

==== Main verb ====
The main verb in Dagaare consists of a verb stem and a suffix. This suffix encodes perfective or imperfective aspect. In this system, the speaker considers an action as either completed or not yet completed, irrespective of whether the action happens in the present or past tense. There is the verbal suffix form -ng in Dagaare, whose function is to affirm or emphasize the verbal action. This affix is in complementary distribution with the postverbal particle la, also shown in the subsection on this postverbal particle.

Ò dà kul-ee lá.
3.SG PST go.home-PERF.INTR FOC
„S/he went home.“

Ò dà kul-o lá.
3.SG PST go.home-IPFV FOC
„S/he was going home.“

Ò kul-o lá.
3.SG go.home-IPFV FOC
„S/he is going home.“

Most verb roots in Dagaare are monosyllabic and combine with inflectional affixes. As already mentioned, the main inflectional affixes in Dagaare express aspect. There are then three distinct inflectional affix forms, one imperfective or progressive affix (-ro) and two perfective or completive affixes (-∅, -e). Imperative forms are homophonous with the perfective transitive forms. An interesting aspect of the Mabia verbal system is that verbs can be classified into pairs of oppositions depending on causativity, transitivity, reversivity and other derivational processes.

==== Postverbal particle ====
The postverbal particle la mainly marks factivity, polarity, affirmation or even emphasis.* It usually occurs in postverbal position, but under particular pragmatic constraints it can also occur preverbally. The la particle is in complementary distribution with negative polarity particles.

*Note that the postverbal particle is glossed as FOC here. Since its glossing in the literature is not consistent and therefore its syntactic nature is not so clear, I thus propose that the postverbal particle may function as a focus marker, while previous research assumed it to be a factive marker.

Ò na kul lá.
3.SG FUT.POS go.home FOC
„S/he will not go home.“

Ò kong kul (*lá).
3.SG FUT.NEG go.home (FOC)
„S/he will not go home.“

Besides being in complementary distribution with negative polarity particles, there are four main constraints on the la particle in Dagaare. Firstly, it never occurs after adjuncts postverbally.

Bayuo dà gbir-ee lá velaa.
Bayuo PST sleep-PERF.INTR FOC good
„Bayuo slept well.“

*Bayuo dà gbir-ee velaa lá.
Bayuo PST sleep-PERF.INTR good FOC
„*Bayuo slept well.“

Secondly, it occurs before all full NP complements, but it never intervenes between any two full NPs nor follows them.

Ò dà ko lá Dɛre a gane.
3.SG PST give FOC Dere DEF book
„S/he gave Dere the book.“

*Ò dà ko Dɛre lá a gane.
3.SG PST give Dere FOC DEF book
„*S/he gave Dere the book.“

Thirdly, a pronominal complement must intervene between the verb and the postverbal particle. In this case the affixal form of the particle -ng is attached to the indirect object pronoun ma.

Ò dà ko ma lá a gane.
3.SG PST give 1.SG FOC DEF book
„S/he gave me the book.“

Ò dà ko mang a gane.
3.SG PST give 1.SG.FOC DEF book
„S/he gave me the book.“

*Ò dà ko lá ma a gane.
3.SG PST give FOC 1.SG DEF book
„*S/he gave me the book.“

Lastly, under pragmatic circumstances the particle can occur in certain positions within the clause in order to emphasize the role of particular elements. In the example below, the particle either occurs after the subject NP and before the verb in order to focus the subject and not the action of the sentence or the particle occurs postverbally in order to focus the action and not the subject of the clause.

Badɛre lá kpi.
spider FOC die.PERF
„The spider died.“

Badɛre kpi-e lá
spider die-PERF.INTR FOC
„The spider died.“

=== Questions ===
There are two types of questions in Dagaare. Usually, questions are formed by a question word in the sentence-initial position, but in a few cases there is either a question marker that has to occur in sentence-final position or the question word can appear in situ.

==== Ex situ ====
The Dagaare bong questions correspond to wh-questions in English, but since most of the question words in Dagaare start with the letter b, it makes no sense to refer to them as wh-questions as well and therefore one can refer to them as bong questions. These questions exhibit the question word ex situ and vary according to its Q-element.

Bòng lá dà è?
what FOC PST COP
„What happened?“

àng lá dà yíélì / yíélè?
who FOC PST sing.PFV / sing.IPFV
„Who sang / is singing?“

In some cases, the Q-element is followed not only by the particle lá, but additionally by the complementizer kà. This might indicate that the Q-element occupies the specifier position and the complementizer appears in the head position of the CP. The particle lá occurs in between both elements and might mark focus, in this case verbal focus.

Bòng lá kà fo mɛ?
what FOC SUBR 2.SG build.PFV
„What did you build?“

Lastly, multiple questions are highly marked in Dagaare. In these cases, one Q-element occurs ex situ and the other one(s) in situ.

??Àng lá dá bòng?
who FOC buy.PFV what
„Who bought what?“

??Àng lá gaa yeng?
who FOC travel where
„Who traveled where?“

==== In situ ====
Examples for a question that do not exhibit the question word ex situ are the so-called bee questions, which are known as yes-/no- questions in languages like English. These questions only require a yes- or no-answer instead of a more complex and informative answer. Bee is here the particular question marker, which has to appear obligatorily as the final element of the clause. These questions can express contrastive focus.

Dabuo gbire lá bee
Dabuo sleep.IPFV FOC Q
„Is Dabuo sleeping?“

Ai, Ayuo lá gbire.
no Ayuo FOC sleep.IPFV
„No, Ayuo is sleeping.“

Besides this type of question, there are cases, in which the question word can also appear in situ. These questions might correspond to echo questions.

Dɔɔsaa di lá bòng?
Doosaa eat FOC what
„What did Doosaa eat?“

Ò ba di bonzaa.
3.SG NEG eat nothing
„She ate nothing.“

==== Long distance extraction ====
In Dagaare the question word can cross a clause-boundary, which gives rise to long distance extraction. The following examples illustrates the potential positions within the clause, in which the question word can occur. Note that only in the second example below a focus marker occurs, which varies from la to na. Moreover, the two complementizers indicate the clause boundary across which the question word has been moved.

Bòng kà Ayuo sogri kà John dà kɔ?
what SUBR Ayuo ask SUBR John PST slaughter
„What did Ayuo ask that John slaughtered?“

Ayuo sogri na John bòng na ɔ nangkɔ.
Ayuo ask FOC John what FOC 3.SG REL.slaughter
„Ayuo asks what John slaughtered.“

Ayuo sogri kà bòng kà John kɔ.
Ayuo ask SUBR what SUBR John slaughter
„Ayuo asks what it is that John slaughters.“
