= Tony Naden =

British lexicographer

- Spouse: Dianne

Academic work
- Discipline: Linguistics
- Sub-discipline: Lexicography

Tony Naden is a British lexicographer who specializes on Western Oti-Volta subgroup of Gur languages. He has compiled dictionaries in the following languages: Dagbanli, Mampelle, Mõõré, Nabt, Talene, KaMara and Yarsi.

== Publications ==
- Marj Crouch and Tony Naden (1998). A semantically-based grammar of Vagla. LS Afrikanistik 1, Univ. Bayreuth. p. 185. OCLC 174505065.
- Naden, Tony (1 March 1997). "Polygyny: A Cross-Cultural Study". Journal of the Royal Anthropological Institute. 3 (1): 184. doi:10.2307/3034397. JSTOR 3034397. Archived from the original on 15 November 2018 – via HighBeam Research.
- Naden, Tony (1996). Time and the Calendar in Some Ghanaian Languages. University of Ghana. Institute of African Studies: Ghana Institute of Linguistics, Literacy, and Bible Translations. p. 130. OCLC 40768200.
- Naden, Tony (1993). "From Wordlist to Comparative Lexicography: The Lexinotes". Lexikos. 3: 167–190. doi:10.5788/3-1-1105.
- Naden, Tony (1984). Law in Some North Ghanaian Societies. Institute of African Studies, University of Ghana. p. 71. OCLC 17397104.
- Naden, Tony (1982). "Existence and possession in Bisa" (PDF). Studies in African Linguistics. 12 (2): 533–563. doi:10.1353/lan.2015.0047. S2CID 12117659.
- Naden, Tony (1980). "How to greet in bisa". Journal of Pragmatics. 4 (2): 137–145. doi:10.1016/0378-2166(80)90050-8.
- Naden, Tony (1979). "Explorations in applied linguistics". Journal of Pragmatics. 6 (2): 195–200. doi:10.1016/0378-2166(82)90031-5.
- Naden, Tony (1975). Collected Notes on Some North-Ghanaian Kinship Systems. The Institute. p. 77. OCLC 12808250.
- Naden, Tony (1974). Kinship Terminology and Some of the Social Correlates Or Outworkings of the Kinship System in Ghanaian Culture. Legon Institute of African Studies. p. 77. OCLC 254121053.
- Anthony Joshua (author), Tony Naden (Contributor) (1973). The grammar of Bisa : a synchronic description of the Lebir dialect. OLAC Language Resource Catalog.
