= Dagbani language =

Gur language of Northern Ghana

Dagbani
- Dagbanli
- Native to: Ghana, Togo
- Region: Kingdom of Dagbon
- Ethnicity: 5.6 million Dagomba (2021 census)
- Native speakers: 1.2 million (2013)
- Language family: Niger–Congo?: Atlantic–Congo; Volta-Congo; Savannas; Gur; Northern; Oti–Volta; Western; Southeastern; Dagbani
- Dialects: Nanuni (Nanumba); Tomosili; Nayahali
- Writing system: Latin, Ajami (Arabic)

Language codes
- ISO 639-3: dag
- Glottolog: dagb1246

- Person: Dagbana
- People: Dagbamba
- Language: Dagbanli
- Country: Dagbaŋ

Dagbani or Dagbanli is a Gur language spoken in Ghana and northern Togo. It has an estimated 1.17 million native speakers. Dagbani is the most widely spoken language in the northern half of Ghana, including among several acephalous ethnic groups historically under the authority of the King of Dagbaŋ, the Yaa-Naa. Dagbaŋ, located in the Northern Region of Ghana, is regarded as the oldest traditional kingdom in the country, and the Yaa-Naa serves as its paramount chief, presiding over the various communities within the Dagbaŋ area.

Dagbani is mutually intelligible with Mampruli and closely related to Nabit, Talni, Kamara, Kantosi, and Hanga, also spoken in Northern, North East, Upper East, and Savannah Regions. It is also related to the other members of the same subgroup spoken in other regions, including Dagaare and Wali, spoken in Upper West Region of Ghana, along with Frafra and Kusaal, spoken in the Upper East Region of the country.

In Togo, Dagbani is spoken in the Savanes Region on the border with Ghana.

== Etymology and naming ==
The form Dagbani is the most common in English, dating from the colonial and missionary period. These anglicized spellings were adopted by the Ghanaian education system and the Bureau of Ghana Languages.

In the language itself it is Dagbanli: Dagbamba refers to the people, Dagbanli to the language, and Dagbaŋ to the land. The suffix ‑li, used to derive language names, is common across the Mabia languages.

== Dialects ==
Dagbani has a major dialect split between Eastern Dagbani (Nayahali), centred on the traditional capital town of Yendi (Naya), and Western Dagbani (Tomosili), centred on the administrative capital of the Northern Region, Tamale. The dialects are, however, mutually intelligible, and mainly consist of different root vowels in some lexemes, and different forms or pronunciations of some nouns, particularly those referring to local flora.

== Phonology ==
=== Vowels ===
Dagbani has eleven phonemic vowels – six short vowels and five long vowels:

| | Front | Central | Back |
|---|---|---|---|
| Close | i | | u |
| Close-mid | e | ɘ | o |
| Open | | a | |

| | Front | Central | Back |
|---|---|---|---|
| Close | iː | | uː |
| Close-mid | eː | | oː |
| Open | | aː | |

Some researchers transcribe the mid-central vowel as /ɨ/. Allophonic variation based on tongue-root advancement is well attested for 4 of these vowels: [i] ~ [ɪ], [e] ~ [ɛ], [u] ~ [ʊ] and [o] ~ [ɔ].

=== Consonants ===
| | | Labial | Alveolar | Palatal | Velar | Labial-velar |
|---|---|---|---|---|---|---|
| Nasal | | m | n | ɲ | ŋ | ŋ͡m |
| Stop/ affricate | Voiceless | p | t | | k | k͡p |
| Stop/ affricate | Voiced | b | d | | ɡ | ɡ͡b |
| Fricative | Voiceless | f | s | | x | |
| Fricative | Voiced | v | z | | | |
| Lateral | | | l | | | |
| Sonorant | | | | j | | w |

- [x] mainly occurs phonemically among other Western dialects.
- /s/ debuccalizes as a glottal [h] when in intervocalic position. /ɡ/ debuccalizes as a glottal stop [ʔ] when in post-vocalic position.
- Sounds /k, ɡ, s, z/ are realized as [t͡ʃ, d͡ʒ, ʃ, ʒ] when preceding front vowels.
- /d/ can be heard as [ɾ] when in post-vocalic positions.

=== Tone ===
Dagbani is a tonal language in which pitch is used to distinguish words, as in gballi [ɡbálːɪ́] (high-high) 'grave' vs. gballi [ɡbálːɪ̀] (high-low) 'zana mat'. The tone system of Dagbani is characterised by two-level tones and downstep (a lowering effect occurring between sequences of the same phonemic tone).

== Orthography ==
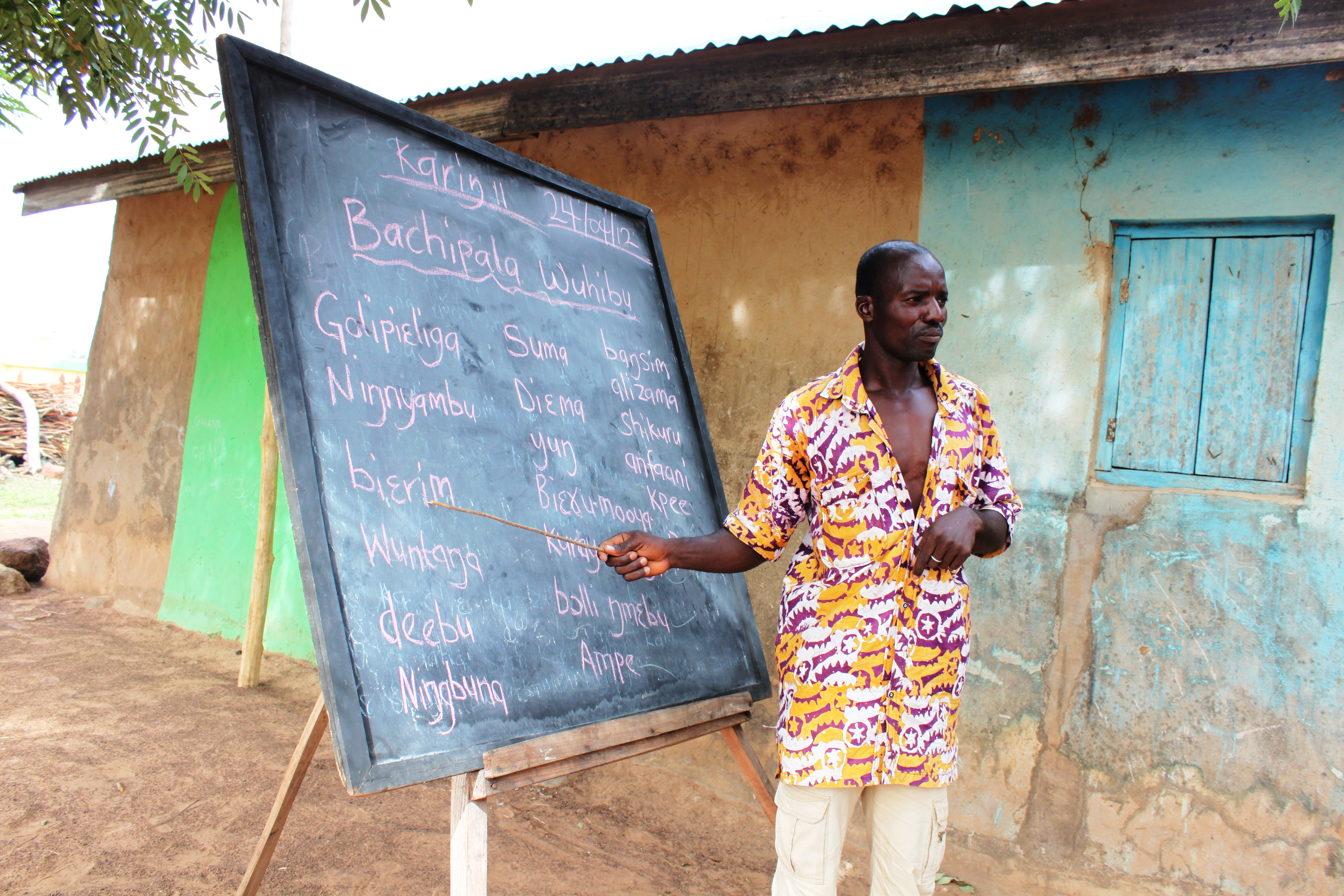
A teacher at School for Life, a project in northern Ghana

Dagbani was first written in Ajami script. In contemporary times it is mostly written in a Latin alphabet with the addition of the apostrophe, the letters ɛ, ɣ, ŋ, ɔ, and ʒ, and the digraphs ch, gb, kp, ŋm, sh and ny. Many of these distinctions are not phonemic, but are retained under the influence of neighboring languages. The literacy rate used to be only 2–3%. This percentage is expected to rise as Dagbani is now a compulsory subject in primary and junior secondary school all over Dagbaŋ. The orthography currently used (Orthography Committee /d(1998)) represents a number of allophonic distinctions. Tone is not marked.

| a | b | ch | d | e | ɛ | f | g | gb | ɣ | h | i | j | k | kp | l | m | n | ny | ŋ | ŋm | o | ɔ | p | r | s | sh | t | u | v | w | y | z | ʒ | ʼ |

== Grammar ==
Dagbani is agglutinative, but with some fusion of affixes. The constituent order in Dagbani sentences is usually agent–verb–object.

=== Lexicon ===
There is insight into a historical stage of the language in the papers of Rudolf Fisch, reflecting data collected during his missionary work in the German Togoland colony in the last quarter of the nineteenth century, especially the lexical list, though there is also some grammatical information and sample texts. A more modern glossary was published in 1934 by a southern Ghanaian officer of the colonial government, E. Foster Tamakloe, in 1934, with a revised edition by British officer Harold Blair. Various editors added to the wordlist and a more complete publication was produced in 2003 by an indigenopus scholar, Ibrahim Mahama. Meanwhile, the data was electronically compiled by John Miller Chernoff and Roger Blench (whose version is published online), and converted into a database by Tony Naden, on the basis of which the Dagbani-to-English bilingual lexicon with explanations is ongoing and can be viewed online. In February 2026, the Foundation for Indigenous & Oral Knowledge Archives (IOKA) launched a full-fledged online dictionary featuring a native Dagbani interface and monolingual definitions. Moving beyond earlier bilingual lexicons, this Wikidata-powered platform established a sovereign digital infrastructure that documents Dagbani independent of an English-language framework.

=== Noun class system ===
| Noun class | Example (SG) | Example (PL) | SG suffix | PL suffix | Gloss |
|---|---|---|---|---|---|
| 1 | tIb-li | tIb-a | -li | -a | ear |
| 2 | paG-a | paG-ba | -a | -ba | woman |
| 3 | gab-ga | gab-si | -ga | -si | rope |
| 4 | wab-gu | wab-ri | -gu | -ri | elephant |
| 5 | kur-gu | kur-a | -gu | -a | old |
| 6 | ko-m/kom- | ko-ma/kom-a | -m/ | -ma/-a | water |

=== Pronouns ===
Each set of personal pronouns in Dagbani is distinguished regarding person, number and animacy. Besides the distinction between singular and plural, there is an additional distinction between [+/- animate] in the 3rd person. Moreover, Dagbani distinguishes between emphatic and non-emphatic pronouns and there are no gender distinctions. While there is no morphological differentiation between grammatical cases, pronouns can occur in different forms according to whether they appear pre- or postverbally.

==== Non-emphatic pronouns ====
===== Preverbal =====
Preverbal pronouns serve as subjects of a verb and are all monosyllabic.

| Person | SG | PL |
|---|---|---|
| 1 | n | ti |
| 2 | a | yi |
| 3 [+animate] | o | bɛ |
| 3 [-animate] | di | di, ŋa |

===== Postverbal =====
Postverbal pronouns usually denote objects.

| Person | SG | PL |
|---|---|---|
| 1 | ma | ti |
| 2 | a | ya |
| 3 [+animate] | o | ba |
| 3 [-animate] | li | li, ŋa |

Given the fact that preverbal and postverbal pronouns do not denote two complementary sets, one could refer to them as unmarked or specifically marked for postverbal occurrence.

| Person | SG | | | PL | | |
|---|---|---|---|---|---|---|
| | Unmarked | | Marked | Unmarked | | Marked |
| 1 | n | | ma | | ti | |
| 2 | | a | | yi | | ya |
| 3 [+animate] | | o | | bɛ | | ba |
| 3 [-animate] | di | | li | di | (ŋa) | li |

==== Emphatic pronouns ====
Emphatic pronouns in Dagbani serve as regular pronouns in that they can stand in isolation, preverbally or postverbally.

| Person | SG | PL |
|---|---|---|
| 1 | mani | tinima |
| 2 | nyini | yinima |
| 3 [+animate] | ŋuni, ŋuna | bɛna, bana |
| 3 [-animate] | dini, dina | ŋana |

==== Reciprocal pronouns ====
Reciprocals are formed by the addition of the word taba after the verb.

Ti ŋmaai taba.
1PL cut each-other
„We cut each other.“

==== Reflexive pronouns ====
Reflexive pronouns are formed by the suffix -maŋa, which is attached to the non-emphatic preverbal pronoun.

O ŋmaagi o-maŋa.
3SG cut 3SG-REFL
„He cuts himself.“

The affix maŋa can also occur as an emphatic pronoun after nouns.

O zo maŋa.
3SG friend REFL
„His friend himself.“

==== Possessive pronouns ====
The possessive pronouns in Dagbani exactly correspond to the preverbal non-emphatic pronouns, which always precede the possessed constituent.

O yili.
3SG house
„His house.“

==== Relative pronouns ====
In Dagbani the relative pronouns are ŋʊn ("who") and ni ("which").

Bi-so ŋʊn zu baa la tʃaŋ-ja.
child REL steal.PFV dog DET go-PFV
„The child who stole the dog is gone.“

Ti ɲa bi-so ŋʊn zu baa la.
1PL see.PFV child REL steal.PFV dog DET
„We saw the child who stole the dog.“

The relative pronouns in Dagbani are not obligatory present and can also be absent depending on the context, as the following example illustrates.

Azima kaagi ji-li ʃɛli ni da la.
Azima visit.PFV house pro REL buy.PFV DET
„Azima visited the house which I bought.“

Azima kaagi ji-li la.
Azima visit.PFV house DET
„Azima visited the house which I bought.“

Relative pronouns in Dagbani can also be complex in their nature, such that they consist of two elements, an indefinite pronoun and an emphatic pronoun.

Bi-a so ŋʊn zu baa la tʃaŋ-ja.
child pro REL steal.PFV dog DET go.PFV
„The child who stole the dog is gone.“

Su-a ʃɛli din pa teebʊlʊ zʊʔʊ maa kabiya.
Knife pro REL be table.SG head DET break.PFV
„The knife which was on the table is broken.“

==== Interrogative pronouns ====
Interrogative pronouns in Dagbani make a distinction between human and non-human.

| Dagbani | English |
|---|---|
| bòn / bà | what |
| ŋùní | who |
| bòzùɤù | why |
| yà | where |
| díní | which |
| álá | how much |
| bòndàlì | when |
| sáhá díní | when |
| wùlà | how |

Additionally, interrogative pronouns inflect for number, but not all of them. Those inflecting for number belong to the semantic categories [ +THING], [ +SELECTION], [ +PERSON].

| Semantic Category | SG | PL | Gloss |
|---|---|---|---|
| [+PERSON] | ŋùní | bànímà | who/whom |
| [+SELECTION] | dìní | dìnnímà | which |
| [+THING] | bò | bònímà | what |

==== Demonstrative pronouns ====
Demonstrative pronouns in Dagbani make a morphological difference between the singular and plural form. The demonstrative pronoun ŋɔ moves to the specifier of the functional NumP and if Num is plural, then the plural morphem -nímá attaches to the demonstrative pronoun. If Num is singular, there is a zero morphem, such that the demonstrative pronoun does not differ in its morphological form.

| Demonstrative pronoun | SG | PL | Gloss |
|---|---|---|---|
| Proximal | ŋɔ | ŋɔnímá | this/these |
| Distal | ŋɔ há | ŋɔnímá há | that/those |

==== Indefinite pronouns ====
Dagbani distinguishes not only between singular and plural for indefinite pronouns, but also between [+/-animate]. Therefore, there are two pairs of indefinite pronouns. Indefinites are basically used in the same way as adjectives, as their morphological form is similar to that of nouns and adjectives. To express an indefinite like "something", the inanimate singular form is combined with the noun bini ("thing").

| | SG | PL | Gloss |
|---|---|---|---|
| [+animate] | <so> | <shɛba> | somebody |
| [-animate] | <shɛli> | <shɛŋa> | something |

== Syntax ==
=== Word order ===
Dagbani has a rigid SVO word order. In the canonical sentence structure, the verb precedes the direct and indirect object as well as adverbials. The clause structure exhibits varying functional elements projecting various functional phrasal categories including tense, aspect, negation, mood and the conjoint/disjoint paradigm.

Dawuni kú-r-í sòònsí máá.
Dawuni kill-IPFV-CONJ rabbits DEF
„Dawuni kills the rabbits.

Páɣà máá tí bíhí nyùlí zùŋò.
woman DET give.PFV children yam today
„The woman has given the children yam today.

=== Verb phrase ===
The VP in Dagbani consists of a preverbal particle encoding tense, aspect and mood, the main verb, and a postverbal particle which marks focus.

==== Preverbal particles ====
===== Major particles =====
| Tense, aspect, modal particles | Dagbani |
|---|---|
| today (also once upon a time) | də |
| one day away | sa |
| two or more days away | daa |
| habitual | yi |
| still, not yet | na |
| actually | siri |
| once again, as usual | yaa |
| suddenly, just | dii |
| non-future negative | bə |
| future affix | nə |
| future negative | ku |
| imperative subjunctive negative | de |
| again | lah |

==== Main verb ====
Each verb in Dagbani has two forms, a perfective and an imperfective form with very few exceptions. In general, the perfective form is the unmarked form, whereas the imperfective form corresponds to the progressive form, or in other words it refers to an action, which is still in progress. The perfective is nearly syncretic with the infinitive, which in turn has an /n-/-prefix. The imperfective is formed by the suffix /-di/.

The inflectional system in Dagbani is relatively poor as compared to other languages. There is no grammatical agreement, since number and person are not marked. Tense is marked only under certain constraints. Basically, Dagbani makes a distinction between future and non-future, however the main distinction does not concern Tense, but Aspect and occurs between perfective and imperfective.

==== Postverbal particles ====
The postverbal particle la marks presentational focus, rather than contrastive focus. In comparison to the postverbal particle in Dagaare, the function of this Dagbani particle is also not yet fully investigated. There are native speakers, who consider the particle to indicate that what is expressed to the hearer is not shared knowledge. Issah (2013) on the other hand argues that the presence of la asserts new information, while its absence indicates old information.

Napari da-Ø la loori.
Napari buy.PFV FOC lorry
„Napari has bought a lorry.“

Napari da-Ø loori.
Napari buy.PFV lorry
„Napari has bought a lorry.“

==== Conjoint / disjoint markers ====
| | Conjoint | Disjoint |
|---|---|---|
| Imperfective | Ò nyú-r-í kóm. 3SG drink-IPFV-CONJ water „He is drinking water.“ | Ò nyú-r-á. 3SG drink-IPFV-CONJ „He is drinking.“ |
| Perfective | Ò nyú-Ø kóm. 3SG drink.PFV-CONJ water „He drank water.“ | Ò nyú-yá. 3SG drink.PFV-CONJ „He drank.“ |

=== Questions ===
In Dagbani, the question word can either appear in situ or ex situ.

==== Ex situ ====
| Dagbani | Question words |
|---|---|
| Bɔ | what |
| Dini | which |
| Ya | where |
| Wula | how |
| ŋuni | who |
| ŋun | whose |
| Bɔ zuɤu | why |

The basic word order in Dagbani questions is SVO, such that the question word is fronted and followed by the focus marker ka. This is the unmarked form and accepted by many native speakers as "natural".

Ya ka a chana?
where FOC 2SG go.IPFV
„Where did you go to?“

Bɔ ka a bɔra?
what FOC 2SG want.IPFV
„What did you want?“

==== In situ ====
Yes-/no-questions in Dagbani are formed by the disjunction bee ('or'), which either conjoints two propositions or which occurs sentence-finally to indicate that the sentence with SVO order is actually a question.

A ni kana bee a ku kana?
2SG FUT come or 2SG NEG.FUT come
„Will you come or will you not come?“

A ni kana bee?
2SG FUT come or
„Will you come or not?“

In addition to yes-/no-questions, the question word can also occur in sentence-final position. This might correspond to echo questions.

Napari dá bò?
Napari buy.PFV what
„Napari bought what?“

Napari dá búá.
Napari buy.PFV goat
„Napari bought a goat.“

== Dagbani-language scholars ==
- Roger Blench
- Fusheini Hudu
- Tony Naden
- Knut Olawsky
