= Konni language =

Gur language of Ghana

Konni
- Koma
- Native to: Ghana
- Ethnicity: Koma
- Native speakers: 3,800 (2003)
- Language family: Niger–Congo?: Atlantic–Congo; Volta–Congo; Savannas; Gur; Northern; Oti–Volta; Buli–Koma; Konni

Language codes
- ISO 639-3: kma
- Glottolog: konn1242
- ELP: Konni

The Koma language, Konni, is a Gur language of Ghana. Yikpabongo is the main village of the Konni people. Another village is Nangurima.

Koma has vowel harmony. The nine vowel phonemes of Konni are grouped into two sets according to the ATR feature:

- +ATR /i u e o/
- −ATR /ɩ ʋ ɛ ɔ a/

Koma is related to Mampruli, Hanga and Buli.
