= Birifor people =

Ethnic group in Burkina Faso, Côte d'Ivoire, and Ghana

Birifor
Birifo, Malba

Total population
- 200,000 (est.)

Regions with significant populations
- Ghana, Côte d'Ivoire, Burkina Faso

Languages
- Southern Birifor, Northern Birifor, French

Religion
- Christianity, and Traditional African religion

Related ethnic groups
- Dagaaba, Mossi people

The Birifor people (also Birifo or Malba) are an ethnic group of about 200,000 in West Africa, primarily located in northern Ghana, southern Burkina Faso, and northern Côte d'Ivoire.

== See also ==
- Birifor language
