= Farefare language =

Gur language spoken in West Africa

Farefare
- Frafra
- Native to: Ghana, Burkina Faso
- Ethnicity: Frafra
- Native speakers: (660,000 cited 1991–2013)
- Language family: Niger–Congo?: Atlantic–Congo; Gur; Northern; Oti–Volta; Mooré–Dagbani; Mooré; Farefare
- Dialects: Gurenɛ; Nankani; Booni
- Writing system: Latin

Language codes
- ISO 639-3: gur
- Glottolog: fare1241

Distribution of Gurene speakers

Farefare or Frafra, also known by the regional name of Gurenɛ (Gurenne), is a Niger–Congo language spoken by the Frafra people of northern Ghana, particularly the Upper East Region, and southern Burkina Faso. It is a national language of Ghana, and is closely related to Dagbani and other languages of Northern Ghana, and also related to Mossi, also known as Mooré, the national language of Burkina Faso.

Frafra consists of three principal dialects, Gurenɛ (also written Gurunɛ, Gudenne, Gurenne, Gudeni, Zuadeni), Nankani (Naane, Nankanse, Ninkare), and Boone. Nabit and Talni have been mistakenly reported to be Frafra dialects.

== Names ==
The general and accepted name for the language is Farefare or Frafra. The varieties in Ghana are usually called "Gurene", and those in Burkina-Faso are called "Ninkare".

== Orthography ==
The Frafra language uses the letters of the Latin alphabet except for c, j, q, x, and with the addition of ɛ, ɩ, ŋ, ɔ, and ʋ. The tilde is used for showing nasalization in Burkina Faso, but in Ghana it is shown using the letter n. The two nasal vowels /ɛ̃/ and /ɔ̃/ are spelt with ẽ and õ respectively. All long nasal vowels only get their tilde written on the first letter.

Acute, grave, circumflex, caron, and macron are sometimes used in grammar books to indicate tone, but not in general-purpose texts. The apostrophe is used to indicate the glottal stop.

Examples of Gurunɛ orthography
Sound	Representation	Example	Meaning
/a/	a	ya /ja/	houses
/a:/	aa	gaarɛ /ga:ɹɛ/	a type of bean cake
/ɛ/	ɛ	ɛkɛ /ɛkɛ/	to fly
/e/	e	zoore /zo:ɹe:/	mountain/hill
/ɛ̃/	ẽ	tẽŋa	city
/ɪ/	ɩ	taablɩ /ta:blɪ/	table (French borrowing)
/i/	i	piika /pi:ka/	little
/ɔ/	ɔ	ɔɔrɔ /ɔ:ɹɔ/	cold
/o/	o	toma toma /to:.ma.to:.ma/	a greeting similar to "hi"
/ʊ/	ʋ	teebʋl /te:bʊl/	table (English borrowing)
/u/	uu	buulika /bu:lika/	morning

== Phonology ==
=== Consonants ===
Frafra has a system of 17 phonemes (or 19, counting /ɣ/, an allophone of /g/, and /ɾ/, an allophone of /d/):

		Labial	Alveolar	Velar	Glottal
Nasal		m	n	ŋ	
Plosive	fortis	p	t	k	ʔ
Plosive	lenis	b	d	ɡ	ʔ
Tap			(ɾ)		
Fricative	fortis	f	s		h
Fricative	lenis	v	z	(ɣ) (Note: Allophone of /g/ between lax vowels and is rarely represented in writing.)	h
Approximant		w	j		

The sound /ŋ/ appears in front of some words starting with /w/, leading them to change into the /j/ sound. /h/ only appears in loanwords, exclamations, and as an allophone of /f/. An example of both of these sound changes are weefo and yeho (both meaning "horse"). The only consonants Frafra words may end in are the two nasals /m/ and /n/.

==== Glottal stop ====
Glottal stops appear at the initial vowel of a word, but are not transcribed. Word-medially, vowel nasalization continues over the glottal stop. In rapid speech, the glottal stop is usually dropped, similar to how vowel hiatus gets dropped in Spanish.

Word medial glottal stops must be marked in writing.

==== Allophones ====
===== Allophones of /r/ =====
[d] and [ɾ] are two phonetic realizations of the same phoneme. [d] occurs at the beginning of words, and [ɾ] is its counterpart everywhere else.

===== Allophones of /g/ =====
[ɣ] is an allophone of /g/ that occurs after certain vowels. It is mostly written "g." Usage of the letter "ɣ" is quite rare.

===== Allophones of /j/ =====
[ɲ] is an allophone of /j/ that occurs before a nasal vowel. It is always written as "y."

==== Sandhi ====
This section will describe all the morpho-phonological sandhi processes that affect Frafra.

===== Nasals =====
Nasal consonants undergo assimilation, coalescence, and elision.

====== Assimilation at Point of Articulation ======
Nasals assimilate to the point of articulation of the occlusive the proceed.

- /m/ goes before /p/ and /b/
- /n/ goes before /t/ and /d/
- /ŋ/ goes before /k/

====== Coalescence ======
When a nasal is followed by /g/, the two consonants amalgamate.

- /n/ + /g/ = /ŋ/

This rule does not apply to compound words (e.g. tẽŋgãnnɛ "sacred land") or loanwards (e.g. maŋgo "mango")

====== Elision ======
Nasals disappear when they go before /f/

- /m/ + /f/ = /f/
- /n/ + /f/ = /f/

===== Stops =====
Two voiced stops become their unvoiced form. Remember that [ɾ] is the word-medial allophone of /d/

- /g/ + /g/ = /k/
- /r/ + /r/ = /t/

==== Sonorants ====
===== Vibrant assimilation =====
Vibrant consonants, also called taps, assimilate to a preceding lateral or nasal.

- /l/ + /r/ = /ll/
- /n/ + /r/ = /nn/
- /m/ + /r/ = either /nn/ or /mn/

===== Lateral assimilation =====
- /n/ + /l/ = /nn/
- /m/ + /l/ = /nn/

===== Combination of these processes =====
C designates any consonant, and N designates any nasal.

- Cm + r = Cn
- Cl + r = Cl

=== Vowels ===
Frafra has 9 oral vowels and 5 nasal vowels.

	Front		Central	Back	
	lax	tense	Central	lax	tense
Close	ɪ	i, ĩ		ʊ	u, ũ
Mid	ɛ, ɛ̃	e		ɔ, ɔ̃	o
Open			a, ã		
Diphthongs					

All Frafra vowels have a long form.

==== Vowel harmony ====
Like many Mande languages, Frafra features vowel harmony. When suffixes are added to word roots, the vowel in the root selects whether the suffix will use the tense or lax form. The exception is suffixes ending in "-a" because /a/ is neutral in Frafra, meaning that it is only one form. Prefixes do not exist in Frafra.

===== Where all vowels must be in harmony =====
In disyllabic words, both vowels are always in harmony. The same applies in vowel sequences.

===== Mid vowels =====
The lax vowel -a in noun and verb endings will change the tense vowels /e/ and /o/ to lax vowels /ɛ/ and /ɔ/.

===== Close vowels =====
When a suffix's vowel is close, and stem's vowel is close and tense, it causes the suffix's vowel to become tense.

For example, the locative postposition "-ʋm" becomes "-um" after the vowels /i/, /ĩ/, /u/, and /ũ/.

- pʋʋrɛ ("belly") > pʋʋrʋm ("inside the belly")
- nifo ("eye") > nifum ("inside the eye")

However, tense vowels that are not close do not affect "ʋm". Therefore poore ("back") becomes poorʋm ("behind").

The particle "nɩ," which goes after a verbs to mark the incomplete aspect, becomes "ni" after /i/, /ĩ/, /u/, and /ũ/.

== Grammar ==
=== Tone ===
Gurenɛ marks a high and a low tone. Changes in tone have an impact on either the lexical or grammatical function of a particular word.

==== Lexical Function ====
With low tones the word becomes a verb, whereas with high tones it is a noun.

vàlèŋà
"waist bead."

váléŋá
"spider"

==== Grammatical Function ====
The low tone on the preverbal tense marker wà indicates future, while the high tone on the same element indicates aspect.

Átáŋá wà nyù kò'òm lá.
Ataŋa FUT drink water DEF
"Ataŋa will drink the water."

Átáŋá wá nyù kò'òm lá.
Ataŋa ASP drink water DEF
"Ataŋa definitely drank the water."

=== Noun Classes ===
Nouns in Gurunɛ have different "classes" with regard to plurals:

Frafra Plurals
Genre	Class #s (sg./pl.)	Singular	Plural	Examples	Meaning
1st	1 / 2	-a	-ba	nẽra > nẽrba	person > people
1st	1 / 2	-a	-dõma	dɛɛma > dɛɛndõma naba > na'adõma yaaba > yaabdõma	in-law(s) chief(s) ancestor(s)
1st	Loanwords		-dõma	ãnkɔra > ãnkɔrdõma biki > bikidõma nõtɩ > nõtɩdõma sɛɛtɛ > sɛɛtɛdõma	water barrel(s) [Twi] ballpoint pen(s) [French] nut(s) [English] shirt(s) [English]
2nd	3 / 4	-a	-sɩ	tɩa > tɩɩsɩ	tree(s)
2nd	3 / 4	-ga	-sɩ	yɩbga > yɩbsɩ	younger sibling(s)
3rd	5 / 6	-go	-ro	boko > bogro võogɔ > võorɔ wɔbgɔ > wɔbrɔ	hole(s) leaf > leaves elephant(s)
3rd	5 / 6	-go	-to	deego > deto zuugo > zuto	room(s) / hut(s) / house(s) head(s)
3rd	5 / 6	-ko	-gro	bɔkɔ > bɔgrɔ	shoulder(s)
3rd	5 / 6	-lgo	-llo	bakolgo > bakollo	soothsayer's fetish(es)
3rd	5 / 6	-ŋo	-nno	Filippiŋɔ > Filippinno sõŋɔ > sõnnɔ Tɩntɩŋɔ > Tɩntɩnnɔ	island in the Philippines > The Philippines mat(s) one of the Netherlands > The Netherlands
4th	7/8	-le (if the stem ends in /l/)	-a	wille > wila zelle > zɛla	branch(es) egg(s)
4th	7/8	-ne (if the stem ends in /m/ or /n/)	-a	bẽmnɛ > bẽma dũnne > dũma gɩgnɛ > gɩgma kãnnɛ > kãna mã'anɛ > mã'ana yẽnnɛ > yẽna	calabash drum(s) knee(s) lion(s) spear(s) piece(s) of okra tooth > teeth
4th	7/8	-re	-a	busre > busa dĩire > dĩa gere > gɛa kũure > kũa loore > lɔa nõorɛ > nõa pʋʋrɛ > pʋa sore > sɔa sũure > sũa tʋbrɛ > tʋba	yam(s) forehead(s) thigh(s) hoe(s) vehicle(s) mouth(s) belly > bellies road(s) / trail(s) heart(s) ear(s)
4th	7/8	-te (if the stem ends in /r/)	-a	tagtɛ > tagra watɛ > wara watɛ > wara	sandal(s) brick(s) cloud(s)
5th (stem vowels change)	9/10	-fo	-i	lagfɔ > ligri mu'ufo > mũi naafɔ - niigi nifo > nini weefo/yeho > wiiri/yiri yoofo > yũuni	cowry shell > money rice grain > rice bovine(s) eye(s) horse(s) shea nut(s)
5th (stem vowels change)	9/10	-fo	-	sĩfo > sĩm zũfo > zũma	bee(s) fish(es)
6th (mostly animals and diminutives)	11/12	-la	-nto	bʋdibla > bʋdimto bʋtɩla > bʋtɩtɔ kɩɩla > kɩɩntɔ niila > niinto pɩɩla > pɩɩntɔ pugla > pugunto	boy(s) billy goat(s) guinea fowl(s) chick(s) lamb(s) girl(s)
(No distinction between plural and singular)	Class 13	-bo		kɩ'ɩbɔ bo'obo / bɔ'a	soap gift
Uncountable nouns	Class 14	-m		bɛglʋm bĩ'isũm dãam dabeem dõndʋ'ʋrʋm gẽem ɩɩlʋm kaam ko'om kɔm kũm mẽelʋm nõŋlʋm nõtõorʋm tɩɩm valʋm yaarʋm yɛm zẽem zɩɩm zom	mud breastmilk beer, alcohol fear urine sleep milk oil water hunger death dew love saliva medicine, remedy shame salt intelligence potash blood flour

=== Pronouns ===
==== Personal Pronouns ====
Person	Subject/Possessor	Object	Emphatic			
	SG	PL	SG	PL	SG	PL
1st	ma/n	tu	ma	tu	mam	tumam
2nd	fu	ya	fu	ya	fum	yamam
3rd	a	ba	e	ba	eŋa	bamam

==== Emphatic Pronouns ====
Only emphatic pronouns can appear in focus positions, whereas all other pronouns cannot appear in those positions. Emphatic pronouns are used in exclusive contexts, in which the speaker indicates that only one thing is true and not the other.

Mam ti a dikɛ bo.
1SG.EMPH FOC 1SG take give
"It is me that he gave it to."

Yamam n sagum loore lá.
2PL.EMPH FOC destroy lorry DEF
"It is you guys (not us) who destroyed the lorry."

==== Reciprocal Pronoun ====
The reciprocal pronoun is taaba and occurs postverbally.

Budaa lá pɔka lá nɔŋɛ taaba mɛ.
man DEF woman DEF love RECP FOC
"The man and the woman love each other."

==== Reflexive Pronouns ====
To form a reflexive pronoun in Gurenɛ the morphem -miŋa for singular or -misi for plural is attached to a particular personal pronoun. While in other Gur languages, the reflexive morphem is not sensitive to number, in Gurenɛ there exist two forms, one for each number.

Person	Reflexive Morphem SG	Personal Pronoun SG	Reflexive Pronoun SG	Reflexive Morphem PL	Personal Pronoun PL	Reflexive Pronoun PL
1st	-miŋa	n	nmiŋa	-misi	tu	tumisi
2nd	-miŋa	fu	fumiŋa	-misi	ya	yamisi
3rd	-miŋa	a	amiŋa	-misi	ba	bamisi

Amaa mami daa guri nmiŋa.
but 1SG PST hold.PST 1SG.REFL
"But I restrained myself."

Ba ka le ŋmɛ bamisi.
3PL NEG again beat 3PL.REFL
"They will not beat themselves again."

==== Relative Pronouns ====
There are two relative pronouns, ti and n. The former relativizes subjects, while the latter is used to relativize objects. Both pronouns are not sensitive to number or animacy, while this is the case in other Gur languages such as Dagbani for instance.

Budaa lá n wa'am kalam de là ma sɔ.
man DEF REL come here COP FOC 1SG father
"The man who came here is my father."

Budaa lá ti fu nyɛ là de là ma sɔ.
man DEF REL 2SG see FOC COP FOCɛ 1SG father
"The man that you saw is my father."

==== Interrogative Pronouns ====
Interrogative pronouns can either occur sentence-initially or sentence-finally.

Ani n di dia lá?
who FOC eat.PFV food DEF
"Who ate the food?"

Sukuu kɔma lá siŋɛ là bɛ?
school children DEF do FOC where
"Where did the students go?"

Beni dia ti ba kɔɔsa da'a?
what food that 3PL sell market
"What food are they selling at the market?"

Naafu lá de là alɛ?
cow DEF COP FOC how.much
"How much is the price of the cow?"

==== Demonstrative Pronouns ====
Each demonstrative pronoun refers to a single noun class.

Number	Gurenɛ	Gloss
SG	ina (CL1)	that/this
	kana (CL4)	that/this
	dina (CL5)	that/this
	kuna (CL7)	that/this
PL	bana (CL2)	these/those
	sina (CL4)	these/those
	tuna (CL8)	these/those
	buna (CL9)	these/those

== Syntax ==
=== Word Order ===
The word order in Gurenɛ is strictly SVO.

N wan kule beere.
1SG FUT go.home tomorrow
"I will go home tomorrow."

Dɔgeta lá wan lu ma.
doctor DEF FUT inject 1SG
"The doctor will inject me."

À bo ma ligeri lá.
3SG give 1SG money DEF
"S/he gave me the money."

=== Verb Phrase ===
The verb phrase (VP) consists of pre- and postverbal particles surrounding the verb. Preverbal particles encode aspect, tense, negation, and mood, such as imperative and conditional. Postverbal particles also encode aspect and tense, but in addition to that they can also encode focus. The order of particles within the VP is strictly organized as shown below. Moreover, the maximal amount of pre- and postverbal particles is also strictly defined. There can be at maximum five preverbal and two postverbal particles within one clause in Gurenɛ.

Time > Tense > Conditional > Aspectual > Future > Negation > Emphatic > Epistemic > Purpose > Verb > Tense > Focus/Affirmative/Completive/Directional

Nɛreba lá zaamtext_{1} nyaa_{2} kɔ'ɔm_{3} sirum_{4} ta_{5} iŋɛ ba'asum_{1} gaŋɛ mɛ_{2}.
people DEF yesterday then just surely in.order do certainly more AFF
"The people yesterday certainly did more than what was just expected."

==== Particles ====
There are a lot of particles in Gurenɛ, such that the total number is not fully clear. The following table provides an overview of the most common particles.

Aspect	Gurenɛ
now, after this	nyaa
in a determined way	wa
intention	ta
an action/event still lasts	naŋ
only	kɔ'ɔm
even	pugum
again	le
already	pìlum
just	kɔ'ɔm
rather	tugum
necessairly	yɛrum
instead	yi
ever	tabelɛ
as usual	ya'am
habitual	ná
Tense	
past	daa
two days ago	daarɛ
three days ago	datata
years ago	yuum
the next day	dagi
Imperative	
must	ta
need	wa
Conditional	
if	san

==== Verb ====
The verb in Gurenɛ consists of an obligatory stem or root, that can take one or more morphemes. Verbs appear either in the perfective or imperfective form, depending on its aspect. The perfective expresses actions in the present, whereas the imperfective denotes actions in the past or progressive.

Root/Stem/Infinitive		Perfective -ri	Imperfective -ra
		(single) closed event	open event
Gurenɛ	Gloss	follows Object/Adverb	follows Pronominal
nyu	drink	nyuuri	nyuura
da'	buy	da'ari	da'ara
lebe	return	leberi	lebera
dikɛ	take	dikɛri	dikɛra
pagesɛ	imitate	pagesɛri	pagesɛra
pa'alɛ	teach	pa'ali	pa'ala
di	eat	diti	dita
darɛ	disturb	dati	data
parɛ	be a lot	pati	pata
kiŋɛ	go	kini	kina
siŋɛ	walk	sini	sina
sigum	come down	sigeni	sigena

=== Question Formation ===
There are several ways of forming a question in Gurenɛ, but importantly the strict word order SVO is always to obey.

==== Ex situ ====
In subject questions the question word occurs as the first element of the clause and can either function as the subject or as the agent of the clause.

Ani n tum?
who FOC work.PFV
"Who worked?"

Ani n tun-i?
who FOC work-IPFV
"Who is working?"

==== In situ ====
In general, questions are formed by raising intonation of the final tone. Questions without an explicit question word have a clause-final question marker -ì.

Fʊ nyɛ ʔí-ì?
2SG see 3SG-Q
"Did you see him?"

Fʊ n nyɛ ʔí.
2SG FOC see 3SG
"You saw him."

==== Embedded ====
Questions can be embedded and are then preceded by the complementizer tí.

Má m sokè ʔì tí 3SG nyɛ Ádʊŋɔ.
1SG FOC ask 3SG SUBR 3SG see Adongo
"I asked him whether he had seen Adongo."

Má m sokè ʔì lá-à ánɪ tì à nyɛ-ɛ`.
1SG FOC ask 3SG TOP-Q whom SUBR 3SG see-Q
"I asked him whom he saw."

==== Multiple Questions ====
Question can also be formed by more than one question word. In these cases one question word occurs ex situ and the other(s) in situ. Again, a question word can only appear ex situ, if it replaces the subject or agent of the clause.

Ani n da (*là) beni?
who FOC buy.PFV FOC what
"Who bought what?"

*Beni ti ani da?
what FOC who buy.PFV
"*What bought who?"

Napari *(n) da yire.
Napari FOC buy.PFV house
"Napari bought a house.."

==== Long distance extraction ====
Question words in Gurenɛ can also cross clause boundaries, such that they originated in the embedded clause and have been fronted to the clause-initial position.

Beni ti Ama soke ti John kõregɛ ya *(là).
what FOC Ama ask SUBR John slaughter COMPL FOC
"What did Ama ask that John slaughtered?"

Beni ti Ama spoke ti John kõregɛ-ri/-*ra ya *(là)?
what FOC Ama ask SUBR John slaughter-IPFV COMPL FOC
"What did Ama ask that John is slaughtering?"

Beni ti Ama bɔta ti John kõregɛ?
what FOC Ama want SUBR John slaughter
"What did Ama ask that John slaughtered?"

== Greetings ==
Gurunɛ	Phonetic	English
Bulika	/bulika/	morning (Greeting in the morning)
Wuntɛɛŋa	/wʊn.tɛ:.ŋa/	sun (Greeting around noon)
Zaanuurɛ	/za:jʋɻɛ/	Evening (Greeting in the evening)
Zaare	/za:r̝e/	Welcome
Tuuma Tuuma	/to:.ma.to:.ma/	a greeting similar to "Hello" (every time of the day)
Nambaa	/ˈnaːm.ba:/	Response to these greetings

== Geography ==
Continents
English	Gurunɛ
Africa	Afrika
America	Amerika
Antarctica	Antartika
Asia	Asia
Australia	Australia
Europe	Europa
Oceania	Okeania

Solemitẽŋa means "land of the white man" and is used to refer to all non-African countries.

Soleminɛ is theoretically referring to all non-African languages, however it is only used to refer to English.

== Bibliography ==
- Atintono, Samuel (2011). Verb Morphology: Phrase structure in a Gur Language (Gurenɛ). Saarbrücken: Lambert Academic Publishing.
- Bodomo, Adams, Hasiyatu Abubakari & Samuel Alhassan Issah (2020). Handbook of the Mabia Languages of West Africa. Glienicke: Galda Verlag
- Kropp-Dakubu, M.E., S. Awinkene Antintono, and E. Avea Nsoh, A Gurenɛ–English Dictionary and accompanying English–Gurenɛ Glossary
- Kropp-Dakubu, M.E. (2009). Parlons farefari (gurenè): langue et culture de Bolgatanga (Ghana) et ses environs. Paris: L`Harmattan
- Niggli, Idda; Niggli, Urs (2007). De la phonologie à l'orthographe : Le ninkãrɛ au Burkina Faso. SIL.
- Ninkare Frafra Dictionary
