= Small capital I =

Additional letter of the Latin alphabet

- Ɪ ɪ

Usage
- Writing system: Latin script
- Type: Alphabetic
- Sound values: [ɪ]
- In Unicode: U+A7AE, U+026A

History
- Descendants: ᵻ; ᶧ; ᶦ

Other
- Writing direction: Left-to-Right

Small capital I is an additional letter of the Latin alphabet, a small capital form of ⟨I⟩ with crossbar serifs. Although ⟨ɪ⟩ is usually an allograph of the Latin letter ⟨I i⟩, it is considered as an additional letter in the African reference alphabet and has been used as such in some publications in the Kulango languages in Côte d'Ivoire in the 1990s. In the International Phonetic Alphabet, the lowercase small capital I /ɪ/ is used as the symbol for the near-close near-front unrounded vowel, like the letter i in the word "fit".

== Encoding ==
Until Unicode 8.0.0 (2015), uppercase I with crossbars was not yet encoded. To fill out the gap, a number of fonts contained a non-standard glyph, or used a code point from Private Use Area of Unicode. But this oddity has gone since the 9.0 version of Unicode (2016).

- Unicode:
  - Capital Ɪ: U+A7AE Ɪ LATIN CAPITAL LETTER SMALL CAPITAL I since Unicode 9.0.0 (2016)
  - Lowercase ɪ: U+026A ɪ LATIN LETTER SMALL CAPITAL I since Unicode 1.0
- ISO 6438:
  - Capital Ɪ: missing
  - Lowercase ɪ: 0xBF

== Glyphs ==
Examples of I (both majuscule and small caps) with crossbars.

In serif (and some other) typefaces the letter "ɪ" usually has two crossbars, which distinguishes it from the lowercase "ı" (dotless I), otherwise homoglyphical, but whose upper serif has another configuration.

== See also ==
- Dotless I ⟨I, ı⟩
- Latin Iota ⟨Ɩ, ɩ⟩

== Bibliography ==
- Pascal Boyeldieu, Stefan Elders, Gudrun Miehe. 2008. Grammaire koulango (parler de Bouna, Côte d’Ivoire). Köln: Rüdiger Köppe. ISBN 978-3-89645-610-6.
- Diocèse de Bondoukou Nassian. 1992. Syllabaire koulango: réservé aux élèves des cours bibliques en Koulango (Inspiré par les syllabaires de la Société Internationale de Linguistique, collection: « Je lis ma langue », Nouvelles Éditions Africaines / EDICEF). Nassian: Diocèse de Bondoukou.
- Ahoua, F., & Adouakou, S. (2009). Parlons agni indénié. Côte d’Ivoire. Paris: L’Harmattan.
- UNESCO. 1980. Alphabet africain de référence. Paris: UNESCO, Secteur de la Culture et de la Communication.
