= Notre language =

Gur language spoken in Benin

Nootre
- Boulba
- Native to: Benin
- Native speakers: 1,500 (2002)
- Language family: Niger–Congo?: Atlantic–Congo; Gur; Northern; Oti–Volta; Moré–Dagbani; Nootre

Language codes
- ISO 639-3: bly
- Glottolog: notr1240
- ELP: Notre

Nootre, also known as Boulba, is a Gur language of Benin.
