= Kamusi project =

Collaborative online dictionary

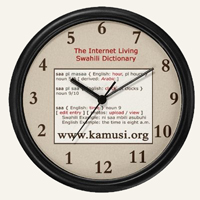
Swahili clock as provided by the Kamusi Project

The Kamusi Project is a cooperative online dictionary which aims to produce dictionaries and other language resources for every language, and to make those resources available free to everyone. Users can register and add content. "Kamusi" is the Swahili word for dictionary. It belongs to Kamusi Project International based in Geneva.

The project was started in 1994 at the Council on African Studies at Yale University (United States) as an online dictionary of the Swahili language under the name of the "Internet Living Swahili Dictionary" by its founder and present director Martin Benjamin. Since restructuring in 2014 the Swahili vocabulary is no more accessible.

In 2007 the project spun off from Yale. Since 2009 it has been run jointly by Kamusi Project International, a non profit association registered in Geneva, Switzerland, and Kamusi Project USA, a 501(c)(3) organization. From 2013 through 2017, it also had an academic base at the Distributed Information Systems Laboratory at EPFL in Lausanne.

Since 2010 programming and the Swahili-English database have been expanded to incorporate other languages. Kamusi project is open to build interconnected dictionaries for all existing languages. The project was knocked offline for a year beginning in mid-2015 when its server was unable to handle the data load for expanding to multiple languages. After reprogramming within a graph database paradigm, service was restored and opened to many new languages in 2016, though conversion of the original Swahili data to the new system continues to languish due to lack of funds.

Kamusi was recognized by the Obama administration as a launch partner in the White House Big Data Initiative in 2013.

In 2017, the project began an experimental technical development wing called Kamusi Labs that grows the project through volunteer internship projects with students from universities around the world.

In 2017 the project distributed more than 60,000 entries between Swahili and English via a mobile app called "English Swahili Dictionary Fr", and had concept-linked data containing 1,769,137 terms across 43 languages. In addition to the kamusi.org website, this data, comprising 1806 bilingual dictionaries, is available for free to the public via the Kamusi Here! app on Android and iPhone, KamusiBot on Facebook, and EmojiWorldBot on Telegram. Arabic, Assamese, Basque, Bengali, Bodo, Bulgarian, Catalan, Croatian, Czech, Danish, Dutch, English, Galician, Greek, Gujarati, Hindi, Irish, Italian, Kannada, Kashmiri, Konkani, Malayalam, Mamprusi language Mandarin Chinese, Meitei, Marathi, Nepali, Oriya, Persian, Portuguese, Punjabi, Romanian, Russian, Sanskrit, Northern Sotho, Slovak, Spanish, Tamil, Telugu, Tswana, Urdu, Venda, Xhosa, and Zulu
