= Southern Birifor language =

Gur language spoken in Ghana and Ivory Coast

Southern Birifor
- Birfoɔr
- Native to: Ghana, Ivory Coast
- Ethnicity: Birifor
- Native speakers: 190,000 (2017)
- Language family: Niger–Congo?: Atlantic–Congo; Gur; Northern; Oti–Volta; Moré–Dagbani; Moré; Dagaare–Birifor; Birifor; Southern Birifor
- Writing system: Latin (Southern Birifor alphabet)

Language codes
- ISO 639-3: biv
- Glottolog: sout2790

Southern Birifor is a Gur language of the Niger–Congo family. It is spoken by about 200,000 people, mainly in Ghana, particularly in Upper West and Northern regions, with perhaps ten thousand in Zanzan district of Ivory Coast.

== Phonology ==
=== Vowels ===
	Front	Central	Back
Close	i iː ĩ ĩː		u uː ũ ũː
Near-close	ɪ ɪː ɪ̃ ɪ̃ː		ʊ ʊː ʊ̃ ʊ̃ː
Close-mid	e eː ẽ ẽː		o oː õ õː
Open-mid	ɛ ɛː ɛ̃ ɛ̃ː		ɔ ɔː ɔ̃ ɔ̃ː
Open		a aː ã ãː	

=== Consonants ===
		Labial	Alveolar	Palatal	Velar	Labio- velar	Glottal
Plosive/ Affricate	voiceless	p	t	c	k	k͡p	
Plosive/ Affricate	voiced	b	d	ɟ	ɡ	ɡ͡b	
Fricative	voiceless	f	s				h
Fricative	voiced	v					
Nasal	plain	m	n	ɲ	ŋ	ŋ͡m	
Approximant	plain		l	j		w	
Approximant	glottal		ˀl	ˀj		ˀw	
Trill			r				

== Orthography ==
It is written in this alphabet:

Majuscules
A	Ã	B	C	D	E	Ẽ	Ɛ	Ɛ̃	F	G	Gb	H	I	Ĩ	Ɩ	Ɩ̃	J	K	Kp	L	ʹL	M	N	Ny	Ŋ	Ŋm	O	Õ	Ɔ	Ɔ̃	P	R	S	T	U	Ũ	Ʋ	Ʋ̃	V	W	ʹW	Y	ʹY
Minuscules
a	ã	b	c	d	e	ẽ	ɛ	ɛ̃	f	g	gb	h	i	ĩ	ɩ	ɩ̃	j	k	kp	l	ʹl	m	n	ny	ŋ	ŋm	o	õ	ɔ	ɔ̃	p	r	s	t	u	ũ	ʋ	ʋ̃	v	w	ʹw	y	ʹy
Phonetic value
a	ã	b	c	d	e	ẽ	ɛ	ɛ̃	f	ɡ	ɡ͡b	h	i	ĩ	ɪ	ɪ̃	ɟ	k	k͡p	l	ˀl	m	n	ɲ	ŋ	ŋ͡m	o	õ	ɔ	ɔ̃	p	r	s	t	u	ũ	ʊ	ʊ̃	v	w	ˀw	j	ˀj

Long vowels are written double.
