= Fusheini Hudu =

Dr. Fusheini Hudu
- Fusheini Hudu Angulu

Academic background
- Education: The University of British Columbia; University of Alberta; University of Ghana

Academic work
- Discipline: Linguist
- Sub-discipline: Phonology
- Institutions: University of Ghana; University of Education

Fusheini Hudu Angulu is a Ghanaian linguist and specialist in Dagbani language phonology. He lectures at the University of Ghana department of Linguistics.

== Publications ==
- Hudu, Fusheini (2005). Number Marking in Dagbani.
- Proceedings of WSCLA XII: the twelfth workshop on structure and constituency in languages of the Americas : Lethbridge, Alberta, Canada, March 30-April 1, 2007. undefined Workshop on Structure and Constituency in Languages of the Americas, Seok Koon Chin, Fusheini Hudu (eds.). Vancouver: University of British Columbia, Dept. of Linguistics. 2008.
- Hudu, Fusheini (2010). Dagbani tongue-root harmony: a formal account with ultrasound investigation (Thesis). University of British Columbia. doi:10.14288/1.0071197. hdl:2429/27777.
- Hudu, Fusheini (2012). "Dagbani focus particles, a descriptive study". Journal of West African Languages. 39 (1): 97–129.
- Fusheini Hudu (2013). "Dagbani tongue-root harmony: triggers, targets and blockers". Journal of African Languages and Linguistics. 34 (1): 47–73. ISSN 0167-6164.
- Hudu, Fusheini (2014). "ATR] feature involves a distinct tongue root articulation: Evidence from ultrasound imaging". Lingua Lingua. 143 (2): 36–51. doi:10.1016/j.lingua.2013.12.009. ISSN 0024-3841.
- Fusheini Hudu (2014). "What is the Phonological Word in Dagbani? A Positional Faithfulness Account". Universitas (University of Ghana). 3 (1): 1–44. doi:10.4314/gjl.v3i1.1. OCLC 5704940036. Wikidata Q56687408.
- Fusheini Hudu (2016). "A phonetic inquiry into Dagbani vowel neutralisations". Journal of African Languages and Linguistics. 37 (1): 59–89. ISSN 0167-6164.
