= Buli language (Ghana) =

Gur language of Ghana

Buli
- Kanjaga
- Native to: Ghana
- Speakers: 170,000 (2013)
- Language family: Niger–Congo?: Atlantic–Congo; Gur; Northern; Oti–Volta; Buli–Koma; Buli

Language codes
- ISO 639-3: bwu
- Glottolog: buli1254
- ELP: Buli

The Distribution of Buli Speakers.

Buli, or Kanjaga, is a Gur language of Ghana primarily spoken in the Builsa North District and Builsa South District, located in the Upper East Region of the country. It is an SVO language and has 200,000 speakers.

The Buli dialects are not well researched and claims about these dialects are therefore inconsistent. One dialect is Chuchuliga, spoken in the northern part of Ghana close to Navrongo. This dialect is influenced by Kasem, which is another Gur language spoken in the Upper East Region of northern Ghana and in Burkina Faso. Chuchuliga has specific morphological features such as the lack of diphthongs, a richer nominal morphology and the lack of low tones, which are similar to other varieties of Buli. According to Ethnologue, Buli does not show dialectal variation and is reportedly similar to Konni, which is spoken in the districts of Nangurima and Yikpabongo. Moreover, Buli is lexically similar to Mampruli (77%).

== Phonology ==
=== Consonants ===
		Labial	Alveolar	Palatal	Velar	Labial-velar
Nasal		m	n	ɲ	ŋ	ŋ͡m
Stop	Voiceless	p	t	tʃ	k	k͡p
Stop	Voiced	b	d	dʒ	ɡ	ɡ͡b
Fricative	Voiceless	f	s			
Fricative	Voiced	v	z			
Lateral			l			
Approximant			r	j		w

=== Vowels ===
	Front		Central	Back
High	i			u(ː)
Mid	e(ː)	ø(ː)	ɘ	o(ː)
Low			a(ː)	

=== Tones ===
There are three tonal levels in Buli, i.e. high, mid and low, and the tone phenomena are very complex. Words deviate from their basic tonal patterns when they occur in a syntactic schema.

	Toneme
High level	˦
Weak high falling	˦˧
Heavy high falling	˦˨
Mid level	˧
Mid peaking	˧˦˧
Mid falling	˧˨
Mid dipping	˧˨˧
Low level	˨
Heavy low rising	˨˦
Weak low rising	˨˧

=== Lexical function ===
Bāng
'bangle'

bàng
'lizard'

=== Grammatical function ===
Ateng a chēng yabanga.
'Ateng is going to the market.'

Ateng a chèng yabanga.
'Ateng was going to the market.'

== Grammar ==
=== Noun class system ===
There are four singular classes and five plural classes. While the singular class identifiers are not markers of number, the plural markers mark number. This classification is based on semantics rather than morphology. Items in class one are [+human ] and the suffixes do not mark number, but they mostly serve as determiners. The items in all other classes are [-human] and their plural suffixes mark number.

Class	Singular	Plural	Example	Semantics
I	wà	bà	núr 'man'	human / loan words
II	dì	ŋà	yérí 'house'	dependent entities (body parts, fruits, languages)
III	kà	sì	bàŋ̩ 'lizard'	ethnonyms, trees, diminuitives
IV	kù	tì	síuk 'path'	animals, instruments, mass and abstract nouns
V	bù	-		trees, body parts. animals, liquids, abstract

=== Pronouns ===
==== Personal pronouns / possessive pronouns ====
In Buli, there is a distinction between speaker, hearer and topic. The speaker corresponds to the first person, while the hearer is second person. Topic on the other hand refers to the third person, but is treated differently from first and second person in that the third person form corresponds to a nominal class pronoun. In contrast, the first and second person pronouns are formed by a strong or weak person pronoun form. In general, these pronouns show number agreement. Moreover, the topic forms not only express person and number, but also gives rise to the differentiation between the five singular and four plural forms of the noun class system.

There is a distinction between strong and deficient (weak) pronouns which differ in their tonal appearance. The strong forms have a high tone, whereas the deficient forms have a low tone. An overview of the inventory of the personal pronouns in Buli is given in the table below.

Pers/Num/CL	Strong forms	Deficient (weak) forms
1SG	mí	ǹ (mə)
2SG	fí	fì (fə)
3SG.CL1	wá	wà
3SG.CL2	dí	dì
3SG.CL3	ká	kà
3SG.CL4	kú	kù
3SG.CL5	bú	bù
1PL	támà	tì
2PL	námà	nì
3PL.CL1	bá	bà
3PL.CL2	sí	sì
3PL.CL3	tí	tì
3PL.CL4	ŋá	ŋà

For the singular first and second person pronouns, there are three different forms. The pronouns in deficient form mə and fə can only appear in object function, while the pronouns ǹ and fì can only serve as subjects. The pronouns in strong form on the other hand can appear in both subject and object position.

Asouk nàgì mə/fə.
Asouk hit 1SG/2SG
'Asouk hit me/you.'

*Mə/fə nágí Asouk.
1SG/2SG hit Asouk
'I/you hit Asouk.'

Ǹ nàgì Asouk.
1SG hit Asouk
'I hit Asouk.'

*Asouk nàgì ǹ.
Asouk hit 1SG
'Asouk hit me.'

Mí nágí Asouk.
1SG hit Asouk
'I hit Asouk.'

Asouk nàgì mí.
Asouk hit 1SG
'Asouk hit me.'

Furthermore, the person pronouns shown in the table above can also be used as possessive pronouns, meaning that they are homonymous. The example below shows that the possessive pronoun can either appear as an independent element or it can be clitically bound with the noun.

Mí bìmbìlī lē ǹnā.
1SG pot CONJ DEM:DET
'This is my pot.'

M-bìmbìlī lē ǹnā.
1SG-pot CONJ DEM:DET
'This is my pot.'

==== Absolute pronouns ====
Pronouns that refer to entities, independent of a verbal predicate, always have to appear in the strong form. In these contexts, there is no possible option of cliticalization, because the focus marker ká as the only preceding element does not obligatorily need to be present. The following examples illustrate this fact.

(Ká) mí.
FOC 1SG
'It's me.'

*(Ká) ǹ.
FOC 1SG
'It's me.'

(Ká) fí.
FOC 2SG
'It's you.'

*(Ká) fì.
FOC 2SG
'It's you.'

(Ká) wá.
FOC 1PL
'It's us.'

*(Ká) wà.
FOC 1PL
'It's us.'

==== Reflexive pronouns ====
In order to express reflexivity in Buli, an additional particle, dék, is used, which can either follow the strong form of a pronoun or it can clitically bind with the deficient form of a pronoun. The strong form is used in order to express logophoric reference, while the deficient form is used in cases, in which the agent and the patient of a predicate are coreferent. An overview of the reflexive pronouns is given in the table below.

Pers/Num/CL	Strong forms	Deficient (weak) forms
1SG	mí dék	ǹ=dēk
2SG	fí dék	fì=dēk
3SG.CL1	wá dék	wà=dēk
3SG.CL2	dí dék	dì=dēk
3SG.CL3	ká dék	kà=dēk
3SG.CL4	kú dék	kù=dēk
3SG.CL5	bú dék	bù=dēk
1PL	támà dék	tì=dēk
2PL	námà dék	nì=dēk
3PL.CL1	bá dék	bà=dēk
3PL.CL2	sí dék	sì=dēk
3PL.CL3	tí dék	tì=dēk
3PL.CL4	ŋá dék	ŋà=dēk

Mí nàg ǹ-dēk.
1SG hit 1SG-REFL
'I hit myself.'

Mí zágí mí dék yìtìyā.
1SG rise 1SG REFL get.up
'I got up (myself).'

Bà-wèènì àyēn bá dék lè jām.
3PL.CL1-say COMP 3PL.CL1 REFL FUT come
'They said that they themselves will come.'

==== Reciprocal Pronouns ====
The particle dék expressing reflexivity in a construction with a pronoun can also be used in reciprocal contexts. In order to disambiguate the expression, the reciprocal nominal element chāāb can be used in object position.

Bà-nàg ká bà-dēk.
3PL.CL1-hit FOC 3PL.CL1-REFL
'They hit themselves/each other.'

Tì-ɲà chāāb.
1PL-see REC
We saw each of us.

==== Demonstrative Pronouns ====
In general, there are two demonstrative pronouns in Buli, dɛ, lá.

===== Dɛ =====
The demonstrative form dɛ is used in contexts in which an entity to which the pronoun refers to is visible. The form itself can be translated to 'here'. The pronoun is adjoined to the definite noun as a suffix.

Bà-bòrà-ā nāg gɔgtàŋā máástàwàdɛ nē dèrì tààm ...
3PL.CL1-LOC.be.there-IPFV hit dance.PL:DEF master:DEF.there CONJ immediately pass ...
'While they drummed to the dance, the teacher immediately came ...'

For this demonstrative form, there also exists a second, more complex form. The basis of the form comes from a noun class pronoun, to which the demonstrative is adjoined as a suffix and the morpheme ɲā is optionally prepended. An overview of the demonstrative noun class pronouns formed with dɛ is given below.

CL	SG	PL
1	(ɲā) wādɛ	(ɲā) bādɛ
2	(ɲā) dīdɛ	(ɲā) sīdɛ
3	(ɲā) kādɛ	(ɲā) tīdɛ
4	(ɲā) kūdɛ	(ɲā) ŋādɛ
5	(ɲā) būdɛ	---

===== Lá =====
In contexts, in which the entity to which the demonstrative refers to is not visible, the form lá is used. This demonstrative form is also formed by a noun class pronoun, to which the demonstrative also adjoins as a suffix. This demonstrative can be translated to that. An overview of these forms is given in the table below and an example for a context in which the demonstrative lá is used is given as well.

CL	SG	PL
1	wálá	bálá
2	dílá	sílá
3	kálá	tílá
4	kúlá	ŋálá
5	búlá	---

The demonstrative can also form a compound with a preceding noun.

Bà-nē ɲɛ dílá nùè-lā ...
3PL.CL1-CONJ do CL2.SG:DET finish-DET ...
'After they finished that ...'

Mí bísáŋá à yāā ká yí-dílá yīkā.
1SG child.PL:DET IPFV like FOC song-CL2.SG:DET sing.N
'My children love to the sing the song.'

==== Interrogative pronouns ====
===== Which =====
The interrogative pronoun for 'which' is formed by the pronoun form of the noun classes with the suffix -nà.

CL	SG	PL
1	wànà	bànà
2	dìnà	sìnà
3	kànà	tìnà
4	kùnà	ŋànà
5	bùnà	---

===== Who =====
The singular and plural forms of the first noun class interrogative pronouns ('which') are used as the question word for human referents 'who?'. Note that the abbreviation INT denotes interrogativity.

Ká wànàà?
FOC CL1.SG.which.INT
'Who is that?'

===== How much/many =====
In order to express 'how much/many', the interrogative form of the second class singular dìnà is used. It can either appear with the focus marker only or preceded by a substantive as antecedent.

Ká dìnàà?
FOC how.much.INT
'How much/many?'

Jà-nàlìŋkàdɛ à da-ká dìnàà?
Thing-pretty:DEF.here & sell-FOC how.much.INT
'How much is this pretty thing?'

The interrogative form can also combine with the strong form of the personal pronouns from the noun classes in order to function as an adnominal quantifier of a preceding noun.

Nídɔābā bà-dìnà àlē jàmìyāā?
man.PL CL1.PL-how.many &:CONJ come:ASS.INT
'How many men came?'

===== What =====
The interrogative form for what is bɔà, which can either form a compound or which modifies a following noun.

Ká yí-bɔà àtè fàà wōŋ fì-yīī?
FOC song-what &:CONJ 2SG.IPFV say.COMP 2SG-sing.INT
'What song are you going to sing?'

Ká bɔàn yìīlì àtè fàà wōŋ fì-yīī?
FOC what song &:CONJ 2SG.IPFV say.COMP 2SG-sing.INT
'What song are you going to sing?'

===== How =====
The interrogative pronoun for how is sɛ`, that appears in a position preceded by the focus marker ká.

Fí ɲɛ-kú ká sɛ?
2SG do-CL4.SG FOC how.INT
'How did you do it?'

===== Where =====
There are two local question words in Buli, lèē and bɛɛ. The former relates to locations of entities, while the latter is used adverbially.

Fì-yènní lèē?
2SG-house:DET where.INT
'Where is your house?'

Fàà chēŋ ká bɛɛ?
2SG.IPFV go FOC where.INT
'Where are you going (to)?'

===== When =====
For the temporal interrogative pronoun there exist several forms in Buli. One form is a compound consisting of the noun tám 'time' and the question word for 'what'. Another and more precise form like 'which day/month/...?' can be formed by the interrogative form for 'which' and a noun like 'day', as dà-dìnàà. Alternatively, there is a third form, dìmpōɔ/dìsàpō, which refers to a more general point in time.

Ká tám-bɔà tè wà-kpìì?
FOC time-what CONJ CL1.SG-die.INT
'When did he die?'

ɔ-jàm ká dà-dìnàà?
CL1.SG-come FOC day-CL2.SG.which.INT
'When did he come?'

Wà-kpìì ká dìmpōɔ?
CL1.SG-die.INT FOC when.INT
'When did he die?'

== Syntax ==
=== Word order ===
Buli has a strict subject–verb–object (SVO) word order with optional focus/wh-movement and no pro-drop. In the following, an intransitive clause with an adverb is given, a transitive clause with an adverb and the word order paradigm in an embedded clause. All examples confirm the basic word order of SVO.

Mí ɲú-ká ɲwūlì.
1SG drink-FOC quickly
'I drank quickly.'

Núrúwá kàlì mɔātī (ká) fì.
Person:DET sit himself.next (FOC) 2SG
'The man lives next to you.'

Asibi wìen āyīn Asouk dìgì làmmú.
Asibi say COMP Asouk cook meat.DEF
'Asibi said that Asouk cooked the meat.'

=== Verb phrase ===
The verbal system in Buli is characterized by tonal inflection and relatively simple segmental verb morphology. Most of the verbs have a single segmental basic form, to which either a preverbal or postverbal particle is added and a specific tone in order to mark different aspects, modes, affirmation as well as negation.

==== Preverbal particles ====
Preverbal particles mainly mark aspect and polarity. Note that the absence of a preverbal particle indicates perfective aspect.

===== Á, À =====
The preverbal particle á, à marks imperfective aspect. In the subjunctive, the particle á is used, while its counterpart with low tone à is used in the indicative. In the example below, this particle thus occurs in subjunctive or in indicative, respectively.

Núŕmá á bōb nííŋá.
Person.PL:DET SUBJ tie cow.PL:DEF
'The people should tie the cows (again).'

Núŕmá à bōb nííŋá.
Person.PL:DET IPFV tie cow.PL:DEF
'The people should tie the cows (again).'

===== Lè =====
The preverbal particle lè marks future tense. It can either attach to a preceding pronoun or it can occur as an independent particle.

Tì-lè wēēn núrú-mbàlá.
1PL-FUT say Person-DEM.3PL.CL1:DET
'We will inform the other people.'

Tììmū lè bōlisi.
tree:DEF FUT cut
'The tree will be cut.'

===== Kán, kàn =====
This preverbal particle kán, kàn is a preverbal negative marker. Similarly to the tone pattern of the preverbal particle á, à, in the subjunctive the preverbal particle kán has a high tone on the vowel, while in the indicative it has a low tone, kàn.

Ǹ-kàn bàntí-fùʔ.
1SG-NEG say.goodbye-2SG.NEG
'I will not say goodbye to you.'

==== Postverbal particles ====
Postverbal particles in Buli mainly express affirmation and negation.

===== Ya =====
The postverbal particle yā expresses assertion and is used in cases in which there is no preverbal particle, thus in perfective aspect. In contrast to the preverbal particles, this postverbal particle has to attach to the verb and cannot appear as an independent particle. The following example illustrates that the speaker expresses a particularly surprising aspect of the facts. Moreover, predicates marked with this particle are used by speakers as an unexpected or unforeseeable change of situation, occasionally also adverbially translated as 'just now', 'immediately' or 'suddenly'.

Bà-bòlìsì tììmū-yā.
3PL.CL1-trim tree:DEF-ASS
'They trimmed the tree.'

===== Kámā =====
This particle expresses affirmation. The focus marker kà seems to be contained in the morphem ká-, while the morphem -mā seems to be an element with unknown function.1 The emphatic function of this particle is to establish a relation between a truth value of a proposition and an expression from the previous context of the discourse, (i.e. 'indeed, really'). It seems that this particle expresses verum focus, but according to Schwarz (2005) it is an outstanding issue to investigate whether varying positions of the particle in the clause lead to semantic-pragmatic effects.

Mí ɲá-wá kámā.
1SG see-3SG.CL1 AFF
'I really saw him.'

===== Là =====
The postverbal particle là is formally identical with the demonstrative pronoun lá and also has an emphatic function. In Schwarz (2005), the use of this particle is described as the use of emphasis on the subject, which is characterized to a particular degree by the facts predicated on it as standing out from the crowd of potential alternatives. In the examples below this particle stresses the property of being late and having a big nose.

Fì-bèní-là.
2SG-be.late-EMPH
'You are really late.'

Fì-ɲōnní zùà-là.
2SG-nose:DEF big-EMPH
'Your nose is very big.'

=== Negation ===
Negation in Buli is expressed by two negative markers, one occurs preverbally and the other one postverbally. The first example below illustrates negation in the perfective, while the second example illustrates negation in the imperfective. In both examples, there is a preverbal negative marker and a postverbal one, similar to other negation systems like in French ne ... pas.

Fí àn dìgi lām ā.
2SG NEG cook meat NEG
'You didn't cook the meat.'

Fí kàn dìgi lām ā.
2SG NEG cook meat NEG
'You don't cook the meat.'

==== Preverbal negative markers ====
The following table gives an overview of the preverbal negative markers that appear between the subject and the negated verb. The negative markers for the imperative II and the future tense differ only in tones, such that in the imperative II the tone on the vowel is low and the tone on the end is high, while in the future tense it is the exact opposite. The form of the indicative II is the form that deviates the most from the other forms. According to Schwarz (1999), the negative marker àn is associated with a verb in the perfective aspect, while the negative marker kàn is associated with imperfective aspect.

Tense	Buli
Imperative I	kàá kūrī
Imperative II	kàń kūrī
Future	káǹ kūrī
Indicative I	kàn kūrī
Indicative II	àn kùríyà

==== Postverbal negative markers ====
Contrary to preverbal negative markers, it is not obligatory for postverbal negative markers to show up. These rather stress the negated clause.

===== Postverbal glottal stop =====
All negated predicates in Buli have a hard glottal stop at the end of the clause. This glottal stop stresses the negation at the end of the clause and thus functions as a second negative marker. This glottal stop is not always included in the glossing.

Wá-kàn kpì dōnláʔ.
3SG.CL1-NEG die year.DEM.NEG
'He will not die this year.'

===== (Y)ā =====
For reasons of completeness, the postverbal negative marker (y)ā is listed here as well.

Fí àn dìgi lām ā.
2SG NEG cook meat NEG
'You didn't cook the meat.'

Fí kàn dìgi lām ā.
2SG NEG cook meat NEG
'You don't cook the meat.'

=== Questions ===
==== Ex situ ====
Questions that exhibit the question word ex situ are formed by the order QVO, in which the particle ká can optionally precede the question word. Note that this particle is homonymous with the focus marker ká. In subject questions, the particle ālì obligatorily follows the subject wh-phrase, whereas in non-subject questions the particle ātì immediately follows the non-subject wh-phrase.

(Ká) wānā *(ālì) dìg lāmmúː?
Q who PTC cook meat.DEF
'Who cooked the meat?'

(Ká) bwā *(ātì) bíːká dìgìː?
Q what PTC child.DEF cook
'What is it that the child cooked?'

==== In situ ====
In questions, in which the question word occurs in situ, the particle ká obligatorily precedes the question word or the phrase containing the question word, respectively.

Bíːká dìg *(ká) bwāː?
child.DEF cook Q what
'What did the child cook?'

Bíːká tè *(ká) wānā lāmmúː?
child.DEF give Q who meat.DEF
'Who did the child give meat to?'

Bíːká dìg lāmmú *(ká) bɛ̄ː?
child.DEF cook meat.DEF Q where
'Where did the child cook the meat?'

Bíːká dìg lāmmú tē *(ká) wānā:?
child.DEF cook meat.DEF give Q who
'Who did the child cook meat for?'

==== Embedded ====
In embedded questions the question word remains in situ and is embedded via the complementizer āsī, which only occurs in embedded contexts. In declarative contexts the complementizer āyīn is used.

Mary bèg āsī John dìg *(ká) bwāː.
Mary ask SUBR John cook Q what
'Mary asked what John has cooked.'

Mary à-bā āsī John dìg *(ká) bwāː.
Mary IPFV-wonder SUBR John cook Q what
'Mary wonders what John has cooked.'

==== Multiple questions ====
In ex situ, in situ and embedded questions it is possible to have more than one question word. In multiple questions, the particle ká precedes the highest wh-containing phrase.

Ajohn tè ká wān bwāː?
Ajohn give Q who what
'Who did John give what?'

(Ká) wānā ālì dìg bwāː?
Q who PTC cook what
'Who cooked what?'

(Ká) bwā ātì wānā dìgìː?
Q what PTC who cook
'What is it that who cooks?'
