= Knut Olawsky =

German linguist

Knut J. Olawsky is a German linguist and author of aspects of Dagbani language grammar. He chaired the Dagbani Orthography Committee in 1998 that developed a unified spelling system for the Dagbani language.

== Publications ==
- Olawsky, Knut (1997) 'Interaction of tone and morphology in Dagbani' (unpublished)
- Olawsky, Knut J. (1999). Aspects of Dagbani Grammar: With Special Emphasis on Phonology and Morphology. LINCOM Europa. ISBN 978-3-89586-638-8.
- Olawsky, Knut J. (1996). An Introduction to Dagbani Phonology. SFB 282.
- Olawsky, Knut J. (2003). "What is a word in Dagbani?". In R. M. W. Dixon and Alexandra Y. Aikhenvald (ed.). Word: A Cross-Linguistic Typology. Cambridge: Cambridge University Press. pp. 205–226.
