= Northern Birifor language =

Gur language spoken in Burkina Faso, Ghana and Ivory Coast

Malba Birifor
- Bɩrfʋɔr
- Native to: Burkina Faso, Ivory Coast
- Ethnicity: Birifor
- Native speakers: (110,000 in Burkina Faso cited 1993)
- Language family: Niger–Congo?: Atlantic–Congo; Gur; Northern; Oti–Volta; Moré–Dagbani; Moré; Dagaare–Birifor; Birifor; Malba Birifor
- Writing system: Latin (Malba Birifor alphabet)

Language codes
- ISO 639-3: bfo
- Glottolog: malb1235

Northern Birifor or Malba Birifor is a Gur language of the Niger–Congo family. It is spoken by a few hundred thousand people, mainly in the southwest of Burkina Faso, particularly in the provinces of Bougouriba, Ioba, Noumbiel and Poni and in eastern Ivory Coast.

== Phonology ==
=== Vowels ===
	Front	Central	Back
Close	i iː ĩ ĩː		u uː ũ ũː
Near-close	ɪ ɪː ɪ̃ ɪ̃ː		ʊ ʊː ʊ̃ ʊ̃ː
Close-mid	e eː ẽ ẽː		o oː õ õː
Open-mid	ɛ ɛː ɛ̃ ɛ̃ː		ɔ ɔː ɔ̃ ɔ̃ː
Open		a aː ã ãː	

=== Consonants ===
		Labial	Alveolar	Palatal	Velar	Labio- velar	Glottal
Plosive/ Affricate	voiceless	p	t	c	k	k͡p	
Plosive/ Affricate	voiced	b	d	ɟ	ɡ	ɡ͡b	
Implosive	voiced	ɓ					
Fricative	voiceless	f	s				h
Fricative	voiced	v					
Nasal	plain	m	n	ɲ		ŋ͡m	
Approximant	plain		l	j		w	
Approximant	glottal		ˀl	ˀj			
Trill			r				

== Orthography ==
It is written in this alphabet:

Majuscules
A	Ã	B	Ɓ	C	D	E	Ẽ	Ɛ	Ɛ̃	F	G	Gb	H	I	Ĩ	Ɩ	Ɩ̃	J	K	Kp	L	ʹL	M	N	Ny	Ŋm	O	Õ	Ɔ	Ɔ̃	P	R	S	T	U	Ũ	Ʋ	Ʋ̃	V	W	Y	Ƴ
Minuscules
a	ã	b	ɓ	c	d	e	ẽ	ɛ	ɛ̃	f	g	gb	h	i	ĩ	ɩ	ɩ̃	j	k	kp	l	ʹl	m	n	ny	ŋm	o	õ	ɔ	ɔ̃	p	r	s	t	u	ũ	ʋ	ʋ̃	v	w	y	ƴ
Phonetic value
a	ã	b	ɓ	c	d	e	ẽ	ɛ	ɛ̃	f	ɡ	ɡ͡b	h	i	ĩ	ɪ	ɪ̃	ɟ	k	k͡p	l	ˀl	m	n	ɲ	ŋ͡m	o	õ	ɔ	ɔ̃	p	r	s	t	u	ũ	ʊ	ʊ̃	v	w	j	ˀj

Long vowels are written double but without doubling the nasal tilde, e.g. ⟨ẽe⟩ for /ẽː/
