= Latin iota =

Letter of the Latin alphabet

Latin Iota
- Ɩ ɩ

Usage
- Writing system: Latin script
- Type: Alphabetic
- Sound values: [i̙]; [ɪ]; [ɪ̟]
- In Unicode: U+0196, U+0269

History
- Development: Ι ι: Ɩ ɩ
- Descendants: ᵼ; ᶥ

Other
- Writing direction: Left-to-Right

Sample "Ɩɩ" from various typefaces.

Latin iota (majuscule: Ɩ, minuscule: ɩ) is a letter of the Latin alphabet, based on the lowercase of the Greek letter iota (ι).

== Usage ==
It was formerly used in the International Phonetic Alphabet to represent [ɪ] (the vowel in English "bit"). It was replaced by a small capital I (ɪ) in 1989, but it can still be found in use in some later works. Other variations are used for phonetic transcription: ⟨ᵼ⟩, ⟨ᶥ⟩.

In Sinological phonetic notation, Latin Iota is used for a Near-close front unrounded vowel [ɪ̟]

Ɩ has been adopted as a letter in the alphabets of some African languages, such as Gurunɛ, Kabiyé or Mossi. Its capital form has a hook to distinguish it from capital I. The accented italic form ɩ is very often indistinguishable from the italic letter small I i in serif fonts.

In Kabiyé, it is used to represent the sound [i̙] ([i] with retracted tongue root)

== See also ==
- l
- ı
- ɪ
