= Mooré =

Gur language of Burkina Faso

- More, Mossi
- Mòoré
- Native to: Burkina Faso, Benin, Ivory Coast, Ghana, Mali, Togo, Niger
- Ethnicity: Mossi
- Native speakers: 12 million (2012–2022)
- Language family: Niger–Congo?: Atlantic–Congo; Volta-Congo; Savannas; Gur; Northern Gur; Oti–Volta; Western Oti-Volta; Northwestern; Mooré
- Writing system: Latin (Mooré alphabet); Minim Dag Noore

Official status
- Official language in: Burkina Faso

Language codes
- ISO 639-2: mos
- ISO 639-3: mos
- Glottolog: moss1236
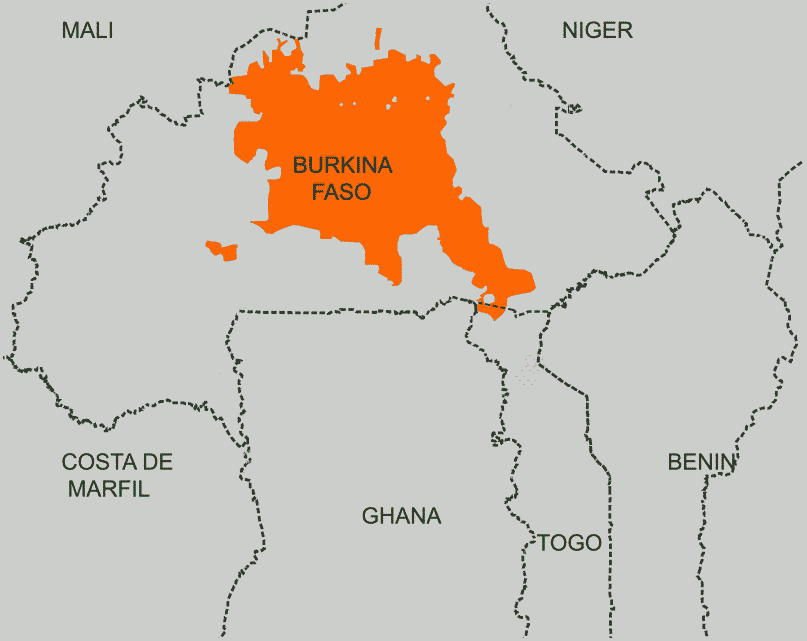
- Majority areas of Mooré speakers (see also on a map of Burkina Faso)

- Person: Moaaga
- People: Mosse
- Language: Mòoré
- Country: Moogho

A Mooré speaker speaking Mooré and Dioula, recorded in Taiwan. Video 1 min:23 sec, 2018.

Mooré, also known as Mossi, is a Gur language of the Oti–Volta branch and one of the four official languages of Burkina Faso. It is the language of the Mossi people, spoken by approximately 6.46 million people in Burkina Faso, as well as Ghana, Ivory Coast, Benin, Niger, Mali, and Togo as a native language, but with many more L2 speakers. Mooré is spoken as a first or second language by over 50% of the Burkinabé population and is the main language in the capital city of Ouagadougou. It is closely related to Frafra, and less related to Dagbani.

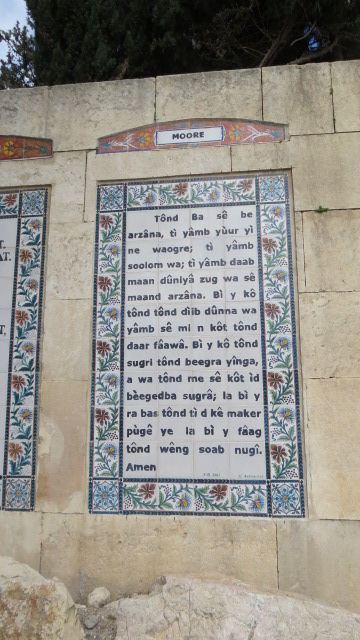
The Lord's Prayer in Mooré translation (Church of the Pater Noster)

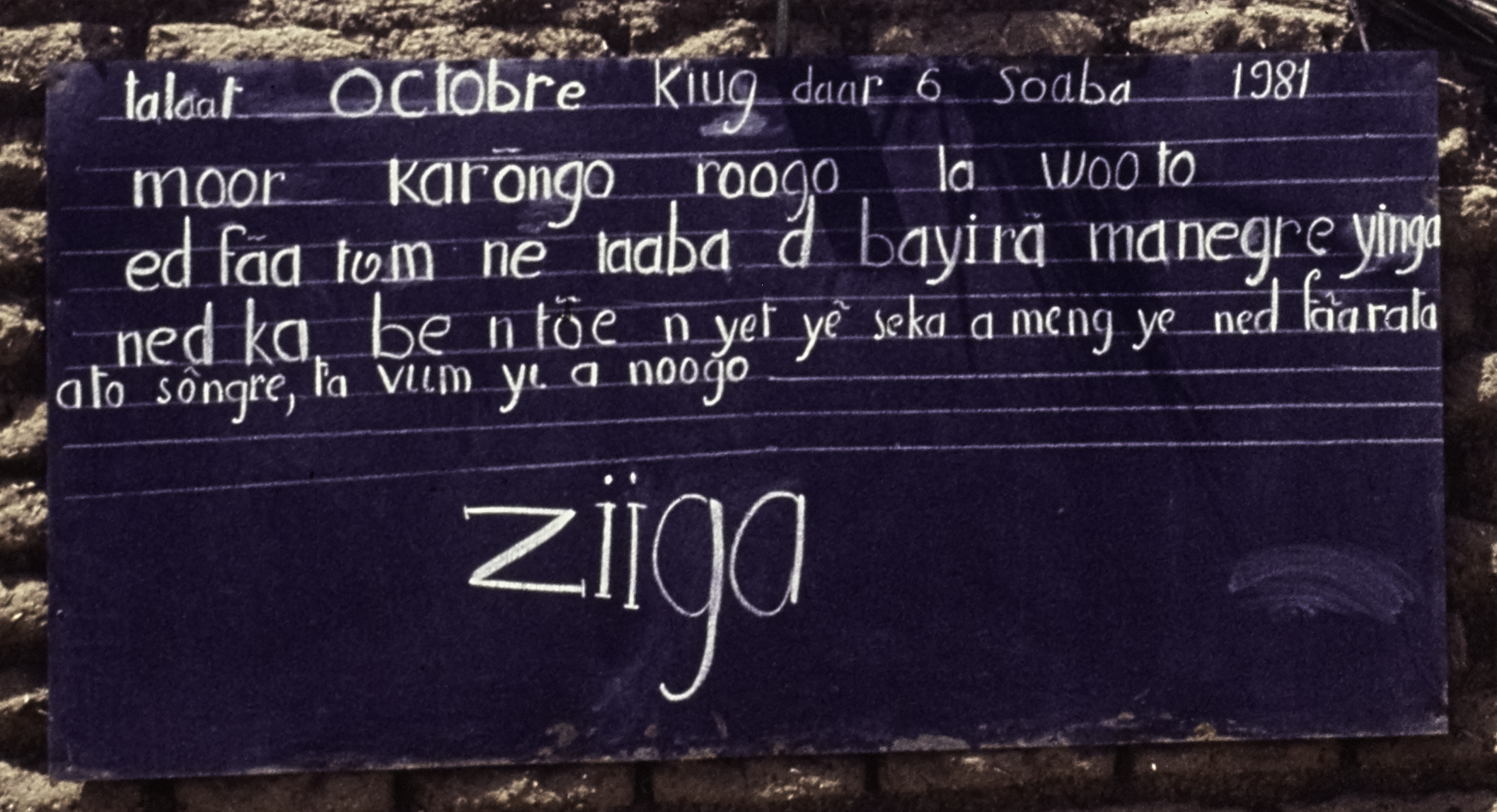
Blackboard with text in Mooré, including use of the letter Ʋ (v with hook)

== Phonology ==
The Mooré language consists of the following sounds:

=== Vowels ===
Vowel phonemes
| | Front | Back |
|---|---|---|
| Close | i | u |
| Near-close | ɪ | ʊ |
| Close-mid | e | o |
| Open | a | |

- All vowels other than /e/ and /o/ may be nasalized.
- All vowels (oral and nasal) may be short or long.
- Other linguists include the vowels /ɛ/ and /ɔ/. Here, they are analysed as diphthongs: /ɛ/ is considered to be [ea], and /ɔ/ is considered to be [oa].

=== Consonants ===
Consonant phonemes
| | | Labial | Alveolar | Palatal | Velar | Glottal |
|---|---|---|---|---|---|---|
| Nasal | | m | n | ɲ | | |
| Plosive | voiceless | p | t | | k | ʔ |
| Plosive | voiced | b | d | | ɡ | |
| Fricative | voiceless | f | s | | | h |
| Fricative | voiced | v | z | | | |
| Vibrant | | | r | | | |
| Approximant | | | l | j | w | |

- The semivowel /j/ ⟨y⟩ is realized as a nasal [ɲ] in front of nasal vowels.

== Orthography ==
In Burkina Faso, the Mooré alphabet uses the letters specified in the national Burkinabé alphabet. It can also be written with the newly-devised Goulsse alphabet.

Burkinabé Mooré alphabet
| Majuscule | A | ʼ | B | D | E | Ɛ | F | G | H | İ | Ɩ | K | L | M | N | O | P | R | S | T | U | Ʋ | V | W | Y | Z |
| Minuscule | a | ʼ | b | d | e | ɛ | f | g | h | i | ɩ | k | l | m | n | o | p | r | s | t | u | ʋ | v | w | y | z |
| IPA | a | ʔ | b | d | e | ɛ | f | ɡ | h | i | ɪ | k | l | m | n | o | p | r | s | t | u | ʊ | v | w | j | z |
