= Safaliba language =

Gur language of Ghana

Safaliba
- Native to: Ghana
- Native speakers: 5,000 (2013)
- Language family: Niger–Congo?: Atlantic–Congo; Gur; Northern; Oti–Volta; Moré–Dagbani; Moré; Safaliba

Language codes
- ISO 639-3: saf
- Glottolog: safa1243

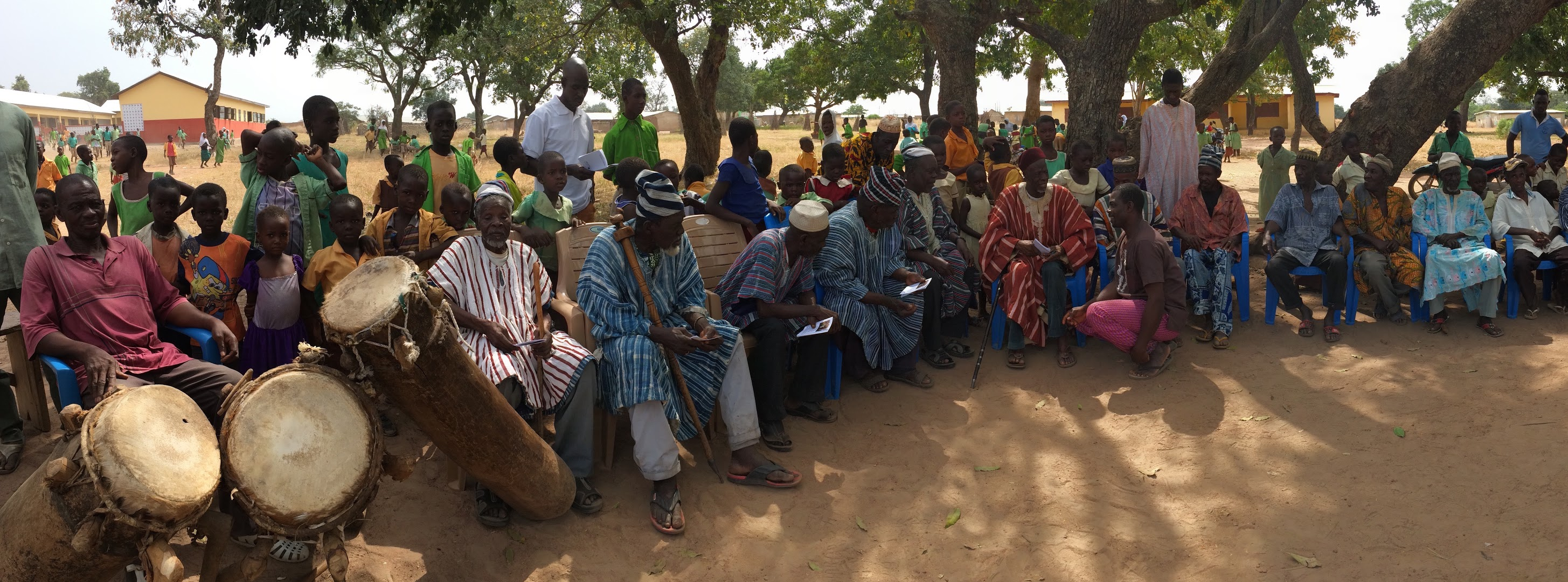
Safaliba Drumming

Safaliba is a Gur language of Ghana.

A recent project has developed a writing system for the language in order to enable its use in adult education and early school instruction. The Safaliba writing system is based on the work (1996) of Edmund Kuŋi Yakubu, a Safaliba teacher and activist; a few changes in that system were made by Paul and Jennifer Schaefer, based on their phonological work, but the writing system for the most part stayed the same. Safaliba audio recordings have been documented, transcribed, and discussed in Sherris, Schaefer, and Aworo (2018).

A social media page on Safaliba literacy activism in Mandari, Ghana, can be found at this link.
