= Wala Native Authority =

Division of the British colony of Gold Coast

The Wala Native Authority was a division of the British colony of Gold Coast established in 1933. It basically corresponded in its boundaries to those of the Kingdom of Wala in 1892, thus reversing the successful rebellion by the Dagarti in the northern part of Wala in 1894.

It had an area of 3,362 square miles.

The Wala Native Authority had 14 divisions.

== Sources ==
- Ivor Wilks, Wa and the Wala: Islam and polity in northwestern Ghana (Cambridge: Cambridge University Press, 1988), p. 10-11.
