= Kantosi language =

Gur language of Ghana

Kantosi
- Native to: Ghana, Burkina Faso
- Native speakers: 6,300 (2020)
- Language family: Niger–Congo?: Atlantic–Congo; Gur; Northern; Oti–Volta; Moré–Dagbani; Dagbani; Kantosi

Language codes
- ISO 639-3: xkt
- Glottolog: kant1249
- ELP: Kantosi

Kantosi, also known as Yare (Yarsi), is a Gur language of Ghana.
