= Oti–Volta languages =

Gur language subgroup of Burkina Faso

Oti–Volta
- Geographic distribution: Burkina Faso, northern Ghana and Benin
- Linguistic classification: Niger–Congo?: Atlantic–Congo; Savannas; Gur; Northern; Oti–Volta

Language codes
- ISO 639-3: –
- Glottolog: otiv1239

The Oti–Volta languages form a subgroup of the Gur languages, comprising about 30 languages of northern Ghana, Benin, and Burkina Faso spoken by twelve million people. The most populous language is Mooré, the national language of Burkina Faso, spoken by over 55% of Burkina Faso’s 20 million population and an additional 1 million in neighboring countries such as Ghana, Ivory Coast, Niger, and Mali.

The family is named after the Oti and Volta rivers.

== Languages ==
The internal classification of Oti–Volta, as worked out by Manessy 1975–79 and Naden 1989 (Williamson & Blench 2000) is as follows:

- Oti–Volta
  - Buli–Koma: Buli, Konni
  - - Eastern (Somba): Biali, Mbelime, Tammari (Ditammari), Waama
    - - Western (Mole–Dagbani, Mabia)
        - Nootre
        - Northwest: Mõõré, Frafra, Safaliba, Wali, Dagaare–Northern Birifor–Southern Birifor
        - Southeast: Dagbani, Hanga, Kamara, Kusaal, Nabit, Talni, Mampruli, Kantosi
      - - Gurma: Ngangam, Gourmanchéma, Moba (Bimoba), Ntcham (Akaselem), Nateni, Miyobe, Konkomba
        - Yom–Nawdm: Nawdm, Yom

Native Dagbani speakers assert that Dagbani is mutually intelligible with Dagaare, Frafra, Mamprusi, and Wali, but in the case of Dagaare, Frara and Wali it is rather the case that many people can understand some of a language which is not their mother tongue. These languages are not mutually intelligible with Mõõré or Kusaal (a language spoken in Bawku West District and adjacent areas).

=== Bodomo (2017) ===
Bodomo (2017) refers to the Western Oti–Volta group (and also including Buli–Koma) as Central Mabia. The term Mabia is a portmanteau of the two lexical innovations ma- 'mother' + bia 'child'.

The following is a classification of the Central Mabia languages from Bodomo (2017), as cited in Bodomo (2020). Bodomo's Central Mabia group consists of 7 subgroups.

- Central Mabia
  - Dagaare
    - Dagaare
    - Waale
    - Northern Birifor
    - Southern Birifor
    - Safaliba
  - North
    - Moore
  - Mid-Central
    - Mabiene
    - Nankanè
    - Nabit
  - South
    - Dagbane
    - Mampruli
    - Nanuni
  - Kusaal
    - Kusaal
    - Talni
  - Buli–Konni
    - Buli
    - Konni
  - Hanga–Kamara
    - Hanga
    - Kamara

== See also ==
- List of Proto-Oti-Volta reconstructions (Wiktionary)
- List of Proto-Eastern Oti-Volta reconstructions (Wiktionary)
- List of Proto-Central Oti-Volta reconstructions (Wiktionary)

== Bibliography ==
- Bodomo, Adams, Hasiyatu Abubakari and Samuel Alhassan Issah (2020). Handbook of the Mabia Languages of West Africa. Glienicke: Galda Verlag. ISBN 978-3-96203-118-3.
