= Latin epsilon =

Letter of the Latin alphabet

- Ɛ ɛ

Usage
- Writing system: Latin script
- Type: Alphabetic and logographic
- Sound values: [ɛ] [e̙] [ʕ]
- In Unicode: U+0190, U+025B

History
Development
A28
        - Ε ε ϵ
          - Ɛ ɛ

Other
- Writing direction: Left-to-Right

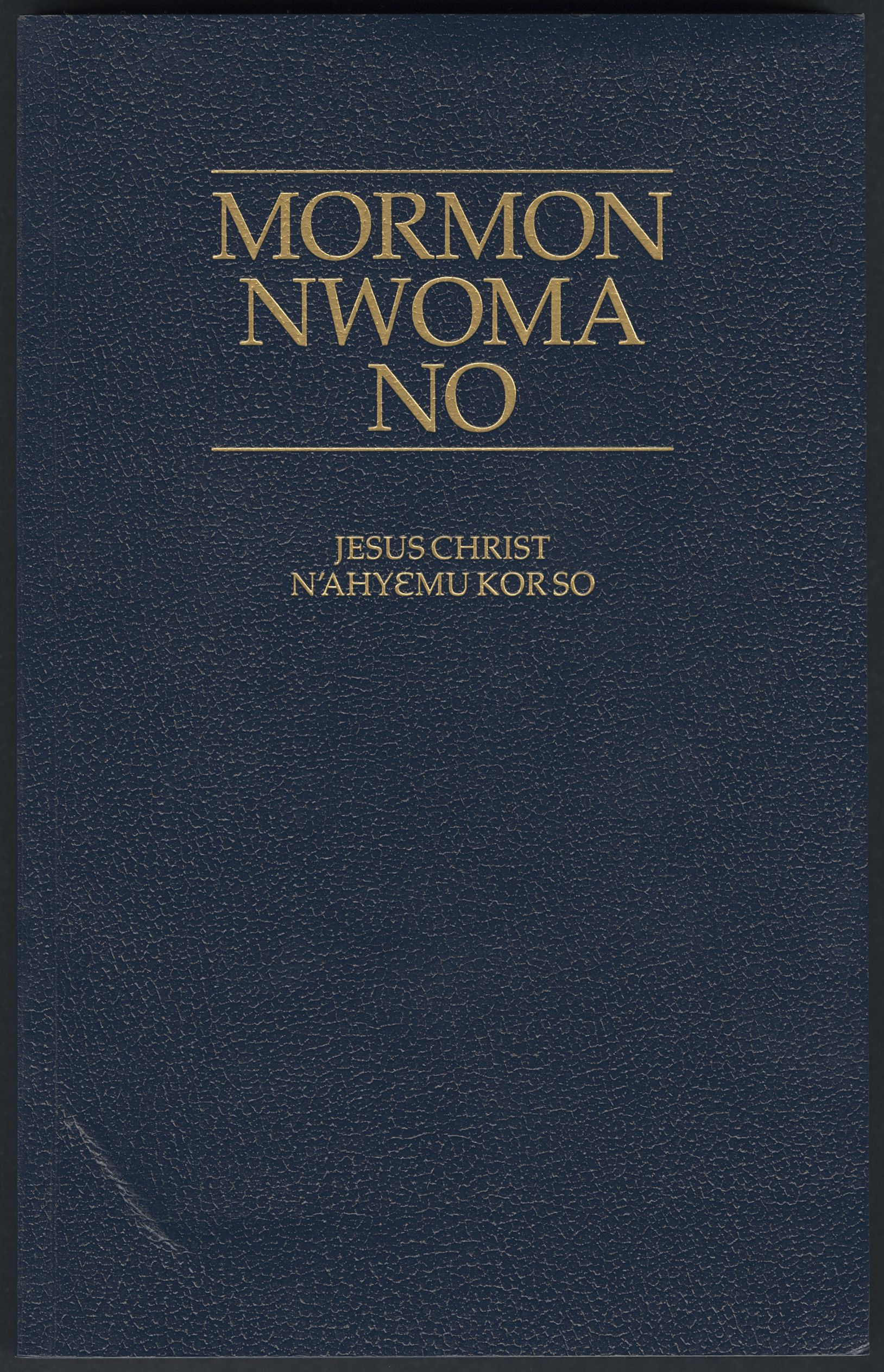
Fante translation of the Book of Mormon; note the use of the Latin epsilon in the word N'AHYƐMU.

Latin epsilon or open E (majuscule: Ɛ, minuscule: ɛ) is a letter of the extended Latin alphabet, based on the lowercase of the Greek letter epsilon (ε). It was introduced in the 16th century by Gian Giorgio Trissino to represent the pronunciation of the "open e" (the letter e pronounced as the open-mid front unrounded vowel) in the Italian language; this use of the letter has since become the standard in IPA notation. Since the 20th century, the letter also occurs in the orthographies of many Niger–Congo and Nilo-Saharan languages, such as Ewe, Akan, Lingala, Dinka and Maasai, for the vowel [ɛ] or [e̙], and is included in the African reference alphabet.

In the Berber Latin alphabet used in Algerian Berber school books, and before that proposed by the French institute INALCO, it represents a voiced pharyngeal fricative [ʕ]. Some authors use ƹayin ⟨ƹ⟩ instead; both letters are similar in shape with the Arabic ʿayn ⟨ع⟩.

== Usage ==
The International Phonetic Alphabet (IPA) uses various forms of the Latin epsilon:

- U+025B ɛ LATIN SMALL LETTER OPEN E represents the open-mid front unrounded vowel
- U+025C ɜ LATIN SMALL LETTER REVERSED OPEN E represents the open-mid central unrounded vowel
  - U+1D08 ᴈ LATIN SMALL LETTER TURNED OPEN E was historically used between 1907–1979
- U+025D ɝ LATIN SMALL LETTER REVERSED OPEN E WITH HOOK represents the rhotacized open-mid central vowel
- U+025E ɞ LATIN SMALL LETTER CLOSED REVERSED OPEN E represents the open-mid central rounded vowel
  - U+029A ʚ LATIN SMALL LETTER CLOSED OPEN E was historically used in 1921 and 1993

The Uralic Phonetic Alphabet uses various forms of the Latin epsilon:

- U+1D08 ᴈ LATIN SMALL LETTER TURNED OPEN E
- U+1D4B ᵋ MODIFIER LETTER SMALL OPEN E
- U+1D4C ᵌ MODIFIER LETTER SMALL TURNED OPEN E

There are capital forms for usage in standard alphabets:

- U+0190 Ɛ LATIN CAPITAL LETTER OPEN E
- U+A7AB Ɜ LATIN CAPITAL LETTER REVERSED OPEN E

== List of languages that use Latin epsilon ==
=== Niger–Congo ===
Akan, Bambara, Baule, Dagbani, Dogon, Douala. Ewe, Fante, Frafra, Fon, Ga, Jula, Kabiye, Kpelle, Kuya, Lingala, Loma, Mende, Moore, Soninke, Twi, Vai, Yoruba (in Benin)

=== Nilo-Saharan ===
Dinka, Maasai, Nuer, Songhai, Zarma.

== Unicode ==
Latin epsilon is called "Open E" in Unicode.

It looks similar to the lowercase epsilon.

Character information
Preview	Ɛ		ɛ	
Unicode name	LATIN CAPITAL LETTER OPEN E		LATIN SMALL LETTER OPEN E	
Encodings	decimal	hex	dec	hex
Unicode	400	U+0190	603	U+025B
UTF-8	198 144	C6 90	201 155	C9 9B
Numeric character reference	&#400;	&#x190;	&#603;	&#x25B;

== See also ==
- Open O
- Writing systems of Africa (section on Latin script)
- Open-mid front unrounded vowel which utilises the letter
- Greek Epsilon
- Cyrillic Epsilon Ԑ in the Cyrillic script
