= Hanga language =

Language spoken in Ghana

Hanga
- Native to: Ghana
- Native speakers: 6,800 (2003) (4,100 in the traditional area, 2003)
- Language family: Niger–Congo?: Atlantic–Congo; Gur; Northern; Oti–Volta; Moré–Dagbani; Dagbani languages; Hanga

Language codes
- ISO 639-3: hag
- Glottolog: hang1258
- ELP: Hanga

Hanga is a Gur language of Ghana. The people of Hanga are found in the Savannah Region of Ghana.

== Example text ==
The Lord's Prayer
English	Hanga
Our Father in heaven, hallowed be your name. Your kingdom come, your will be done, on earth, as it is in heaven. Give us this day our daily bread, and forgive us our debts, as we also have forgiven our debtors. And lead us not into temptation, but deliver us from evil.	Ti ba Naawunni n ba Alizaana puwa, ti kpabira e yuuri du, ka e naalim o ta, niriba ba niŋuba e kiperi, a yi durinye ŋa puwa, a maa seema ba n niŋina a, a yi Alizaana puu la. Taaru zaa tira ti ti bindira, ka che ti yabeeri paŋŋi ti, a maa seema ti gba n che yabeeri, a paŋina ti taaba, ka da ti Sitaana daama o yomsira ti, ka e moligi ti, a yi yabeeri niŋi.

== Bibliography ==
- Hunt, Geoffrey (23 June 2017) [27 February 2017]. "Hanga dictionary". Webonary. Community-reviewed draft. SIL International.
