= Kamara language =

Gur language of Ghana

Kamara
- Native to: Ghana
- Ethnicity: 5,000 (2003)
- Native speakers: 3,000 (2003)
- Language family: Niger–Congo?: Atlantic–Congo; Gur; Northern; Oti–Volta; Moré–Dagbani; Dagbani languages; Kamara

Language codes
- ISO 639-3: jmr
- Glottolog: kama1357
- ELP: Kamara

Kamara is a Gur language of Ghana.
