= Open O =

Letter of the Latin alphabet

Ɔ
- Ɔ ɔ

Usage
- Writing system: Latin script
- Type: Alphabetic and Logographic
- Language of origin: Dagbani language, Ewe language, Lingala language, Yucatec Maya language
- Sound values: [ɔ] [tsʼ]; [ʔ]
- In Unicode: U+0186, U+0254

History
- Development: C c: Ɔ ɔ
- Transliterations: Ꙡ

Other
- Writing direction: Left-to-Right

Open o or turned c (majuscule: Ɔ, minuscule: ɔ) is a letter of the extended Latin alphabet. In the International Phonetic Alphabet, it represents the open-mid back rounded vowel. It is used in the orthographies of many African languages using the African reference alphabet.

The Yucatec Maya language used Ɔ to transcribe the alveolar ejective affricate [t͡sʼ] consonant in the orthography of the Colonial period. Now dz or tsʼ is preferred.

It is also used to transcribe the glottal stop [ʔ] in romanization of Mingrelian.

== Unicode ==
Character information
Preview	Ɔ		ɔ	
Unicode name	LATIN CAPITAL LETTER OPEN O		LATIN SMALL LETTER OPEN O	
Encodings	decimal	hex	dec	hex
Unicode	390	U+0186	596	U+0254
UTF-8	198 134	C6 86	201 148	C9 94
Numeric character reference	&#390;	&#x186;	&#596;	&#x254;

On the macOS US Extended keyboard, ɔ and Ɔ can be typed with ⌥ Option+: followed by c or C.

== Related characters ==
=== Descendants and related characters in the Latin alphabet ===
- Ɔ with diacritics: ɔ́ ɔ̀ ɔ̃ ᶗ
- Uralic Phonetic Alphabet-specific symbols related to Ɔ:
  - U+1D10 ᴐ LATIN LETTER SMALL CAPITAL OPEN O
  - U+1D12 ᴒ LATIN SMALL LETTER SIDEWAYS OPEN O
  - U+1D53 ᵓ MODIFIER LETTER SMALL OPEN O

=== Similar looking letters ===
The first of these Claudian letters is the antisigma.

Open o looks like a reversed letter 'C'. Claudius introduced a Ɔ (the antisigma) with the intention of replacing bs and ps.

Definition from Aasen (1873), Norsk ordbog med dansk forklaring, showing the Danish explanatory symbol ⟨ɔ:⟩.

The Scandinavian explanatory symbol (forklaringstegnet) can be typeset using the open o followed by a colon, thus: ɔ:. It is used to mean "namely", "id est", "scilicet" or similar.

This letter is often used to refer to the Copyleft official sign, which looks like an open o with a circle around it.

== See also ==
- Open E
- Writing systems of Africa § Latin script
- Omicron
