= Talni language =

Gur language spoken in Burkina Faso and Ghana

Talni
- Tallensi
- Native to: Ghana, Burkina Faso
- Native speakers: 100,000? (2015)
- Language family: Niger–Congo?: Atlantic–Congo; Gur; Northern; Oti–Volta; Moré–Dagbani; Dagbani; Talni

Language codes
- ISO 639-3: None (mis)
- Glottolog: taln1239

Talni (Talene), or Tallensi, is a Gur language of Burkina Faso and Ghana.
