= Wali language (Gur) =

Gur language spoken in Ghana

Wali
- Waali, Waale, Waalii
- Native to: Ghana
- Region: Upper West Region, Northern Region
- Ethnicity: Wala
- Native speakers: 85,000 (2013)
- Language family: Niger–Congo?: Atlantic–Congo; Gur; Northern; Oti–Volta; Moré–Dagbani; Moré; Wali
- Dialects: Fufula; Yeri Waali; Cherii; Bulengee; Dolimi
- Writing system: Latin

Language codes
- ISO 639-3: wlx
- Glottolog: wali1263

Wali (Waali, Waale, Waalii) is a Mabia or Gur language of Ghana that is spoken mainly in and nearby the town of Wa, the capital town of the Upper West Region, Ghana. In the Upper West Region, there are two predominant ethnic groups, the Mole Dagbon (75.7%) and the Grusi (18.4%). The Wala (16.3%) of the Mole Dagbon and the Sissala (16%) of the Grusi are the major subgroupings in the region.

The people of Wa are believed to have migrated from The Ancient Mali to settle in today's Wa, the western part of the Upper Region of Ghana.

On 14 October 2026, the Waali-language edition of Wikipedia went live.

== Orthography ==
Wali is written in the Latin alphabet using three orthographies: by the Ghana Institute of Languages, by the Ghana Institute of Linguistics, Literacy and Bible Translation (GILLBT), and by the Baptist Mid-Missions. The Baptist Mid-Missions system uses the basic alphabet with the addition of the apostrophe to mark different vowel quality, and the other two systems use the special letters ε, ɩ, ɔ, ʋ, and ŋ.
