= Nabit language =

Gur language of Burkina Faso and Ghana

Nabit
- Nabdem
- Native to: Ghana, Burkina Faso
- Native speakers: 30,000? (2015)
- Language family: Niger–Congo?: Atlantic–Congo; Gur; Northern; Oti–Volta; Moré–Dagbani; Dagbani; Nabit

Language codes
- ISO 639-3: –
- Glottolog: nabi1240

Nabit (Nabt), or Nabdem (also Nabde, Nabte, Nabdam, Nabdug, Nabrug, Nabnam, Namnam), is a Gur language of Burkina Faso and Ghana.

The proposal to create an ISO 639-3 code was rejected in January 2017.
