= Languages of Burkina Faso =

- Ethnolinguistic map of Burkina Faso
- Official: "National languages" (Note: The 2024 amended transitional charter of Burkina Faso, adopted under President Ibrahim Traoré, removed French as the country's sole official language and mentions "all national languages of Burkina Faso" would serve as official languages of the country while not naming any of those languages. Burkinabe authorities have specifically promoted the Mossi language since Traoré's rule.)
- Semi-official: French, English (working languages)
- Indigenous: Mande languages, Gur languages, Senufo languages, Wara–Natyoro languages, Hausa, Hassaniya Arabic, Humburi Senni, Siamou, Tamasheq, Western Plains Dogon
- Foreign: Punjabi, Spanish, German, Italian, Hindi, Hebrew, Arabic, Chinese, Portuguese, Japanese, Russian, Danish, Dutch
- Signed: American Sign Language; Burkina Sign Language

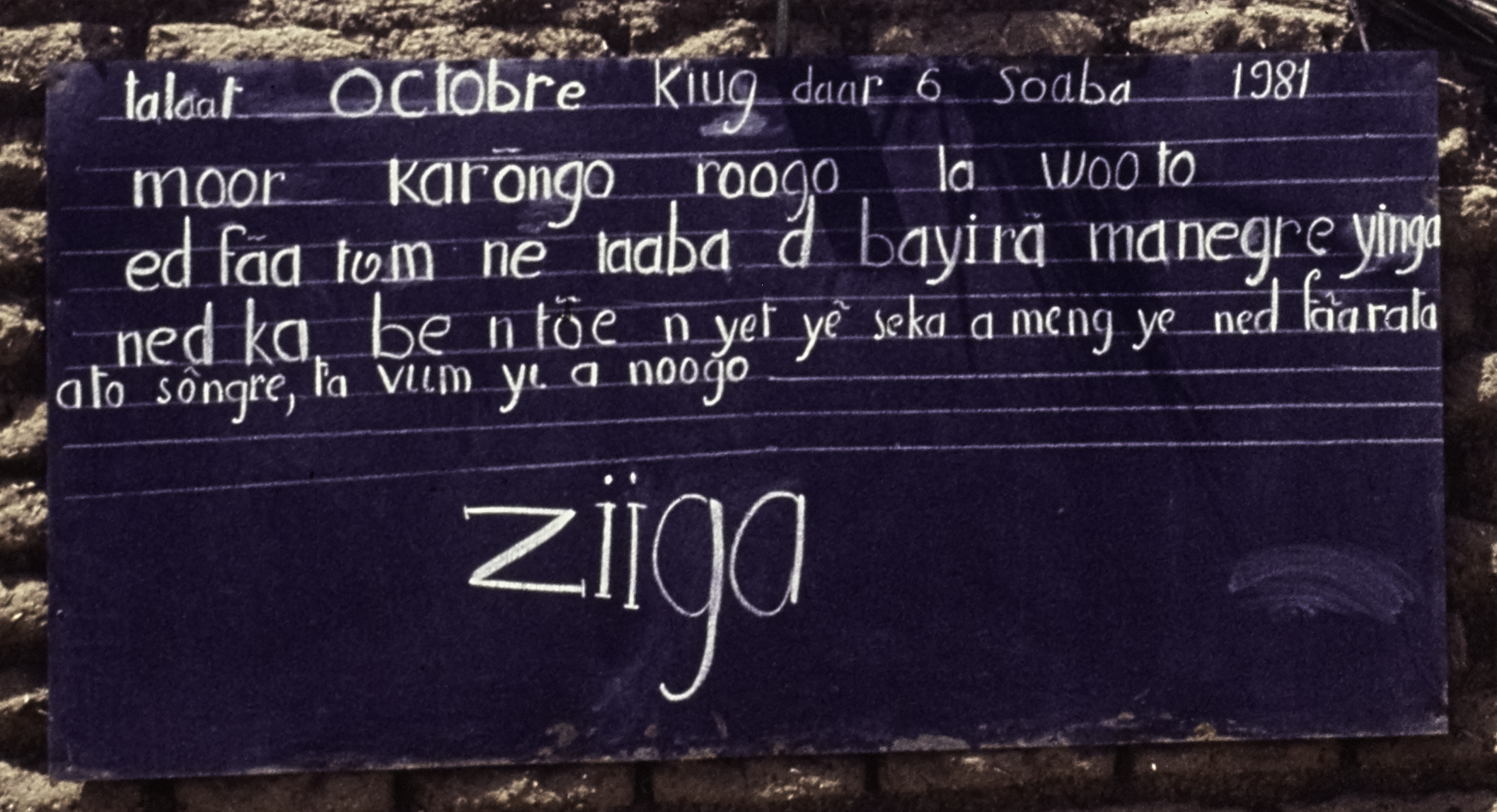
Blackboard with text in Mooré, the most spoken language in the country.

Burkina Faso is a multilingual country. An estimated 70 languages are spoken there, of which about 66 are indigenous. Mooré or the Mossi language is spoken by about 52.5% of the population, mainly in the central region around the capital, Ouagadougou.

In the west, Mande languages are widely spoken, the most predominant being Dyula (also spelled Jula or Dioula), others including Bobo, Samo, and Marka. Fulani is spoken in the north, however it is widely spoken throughout the country as a lingua franca. Gourmantché is spoken in the east, while the Bissa language is spoken in the south.

In 2024, the Francophone population of Burkina Faso represents 22.8%, which is approximately 5,379,000 people. Among them, 1.3% (around 302,000 individuals) speak French as their first language. Additionally, 5,063,000 people, or 21.5% of the total population of 23,550,000, use French as a second language.

Education for the deaf in Burkina uses American Sign Language, which was introduced by the deaf American missionary Andrew Foster. The Burkina Sign Language is used in Ouagadougou.

== Official and indigenous languages ==
Mooré is the most widely spoken official language in the country, with 48 percent of Burkinabe being speakers as of 2008 and is a lingua franca. In 1998, Mooré, Dyula, and Fula were official languages. This caused consternation with speakers of the other languages, who have protested it as an injustice.

The country's name was taken from words in two of the official languages, with ‘Burkina’ meaning ‘man of integrity’ in Mooré and ‘Faso’ meaning ‘father’s house’ in Dyula.

Fula is the lingua franca in many parts of Burkina Faso. It is widely spoken in the north and east of the country as a first language, with 8.36 percent of the population able to speak it. Dyula is also a lingua franca and is widely used as a trading language, particularly in the west and in Bobo-Dioulasso. A 2014 survey reported that 5.7% of the population speaks Dyula as their dominant language at home, but the number of L2 speakers is likely much higher. Bissa is spoken by 2.85% of the population.

Most spoken languages belong to either the Mande or Gur families. In rural areas of Burkina Faso, one's native language is typically used for common activities. In large towns, most people are multilingual. Although not recognized as an official language, Gourmanché is spoken by 5.51% of the population. Other important minority languages include Bwamu, spoken by 1.91%, Dagara, spoken by 1.76%; and Samo, spoken by 1.66%. Dagara is spoken in the southwestern part of Burkina Faso and borrows heavily from French and, to a lesser degree, English.

Endangered languages include:

- Jalkunan [aka Dyala, Dyalanu, Jalkuna]
- Kalamsé [aka Kalemsé, Kalenga, Sàmòmá]
- Khe [aka Kheso, Bambadion-Kheso,]
- Khisa [aka Komono, Khi Khipa, Kumwenu]
- Natioro [aka Koo'ra, Natyoro, Natjoro]
- Pana (Burkina Faso) [aka Sama,]
- Pongu [aka Pongo, Pangu, Arringeu]
- Sininkere [aka Silinkere, Silanke,]
- Tiéfo [aka Foro, Tyefo, Tyeforo]
- Wara [aka Wára, Ouara, Ouala]

== Working languages ==
The working languages are French, which was introduced when France colonized Burkina Faso in 1919, and English. In December 2023, the government of Burkina Faso adopted a bill revising the Constitution regarding language. Indigenous languages were set as official languages, while French was made a "working language" only. French is a language of instruction in the nation's schools. However, fewer than 15 percent of the population uses French on a day-to-day basis. Despite this low percentage, there is a high amount of support in keeping French as a language of instruction because it provides children a pathway to social mobility and assures continued economic support for education. In fact, according to a 1998 report, “Burkinabe saw no interest in sending their children to school to learn a language that they already spoke at home”.

== See also ==
- African French
- Education in Burkina Faso
