= Lobi people =

West African ethnic group

Lobi
Total population
- 741 000 (2025)

Regions with significant populations
- Ivory Coast: 378 000
- Burkina Faso: 352 000
- Ghana: 11 000

Languages
- Lobi

Religion
- Animism

Related ethnic groups
- Gouin, Turka

The Lobi belong to an ethnic group who originated in the area of present-day Ghana. Starting around 1770, many Lobi peoples migrated into southern Burkina Faso and later into Côte d'Ivoire. The group consists of a little over a 1,000,000 people. They make up about 2.4 percent of the Burkina Faso population. The exact percentage of Lobis in Ghana and Ivory Coast is hard to quantify since they are often counted as part of larger groups like the Mole-Dagon of Ghana. Estimates however point to around 250,000 Lobis in both of these countries. [The Lobi people speak two main languages, which are the Miiwo and Birifor. Miiwo is widely spoken in Burkina Faso and Cote d'Ivoire while a majority of Lobis in Ghana speak Birifor. Oftentimes, people use the language Birifor interchangeably with Lobi, especially in Ghana.

== Background ==
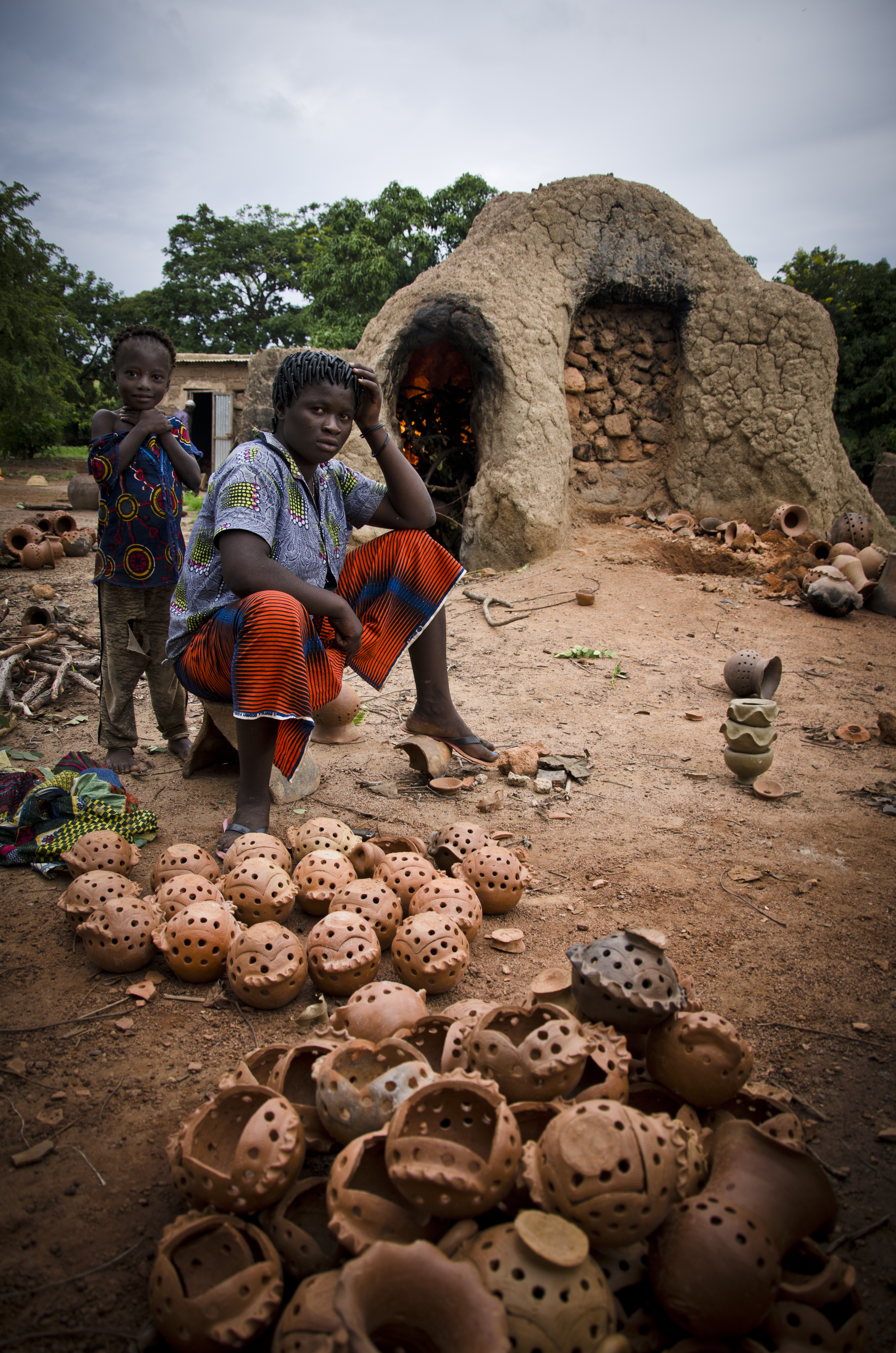
Lobi potter

Lobi is a blanket term that refers to several closely related ethnic groups that comprise roughly 7% of the Burkinabe population, including the main Lobi proper, Birfor, Dagara, Dorossy, Dyan (aka Jãa), Gan and Tenbo/Loron (aka Lorhon, Teese, Teguessie and Thuuna). It is important to recognize that among them, only the Gan belong to a politically centralized, and royal, society. Other groups are commonly referred to as "acephalous," which is misleading, but is meant to signal the absence of centralized political authority. Traditions vary among the groups, but some share a common sense of identity through participation in an initiation ceremony called joro (or dyoro, which takes place every seven years. In terms of kinship, descent is bilineal. Many Lobi houses also share an architectural style, which consists of an earthen compound with walls made from horizontal courses. Most are single-story, and rarely include more than a few small, strategically placed holes to allow light in and to allow inhabitants to view the exterior surrounds. Historically, Lobi warriors used poisoned arrows to fend off attackers (including French colonists). Largely through the use of village and personal shrines, they also share animist beliefs in order to maintain a productive relationship with the spiritual world. They achieve this specifically through regular interaction with spirits called thila, which inhabit a wide range of natural areas and man-made objects, such as bateba, or anthropomorphic shrine figures that are now also well recognized in the art world. Thila are ambivalent beings that require regular offerings—via sacrifice—in exchange for a wide range of protective and benevolent actions. They are intermediaries with Thangba Yu, the remote Creator God.

The name Lobi originates from two Lobiri words: lou (forest) and bi (children), meaning literally, "children of the forest". The Mouhoun River (also known as the Black Volta) is important to Lobi peoples for many reasons. In terms of migration history, it marks an escape from slave raiders in present-day Ghana. In myth, it symbolizes a dividing line between this world and the next. The Lobi crossed the Mounhoun centuries ago from east to west and settled in the lands and brought with them deep animist beliefs and superstition. According to Lobi legend, the spirits of the deceased must return across the river to rejoin their honorable ancestors in the ancient world.

== Lobi country ==
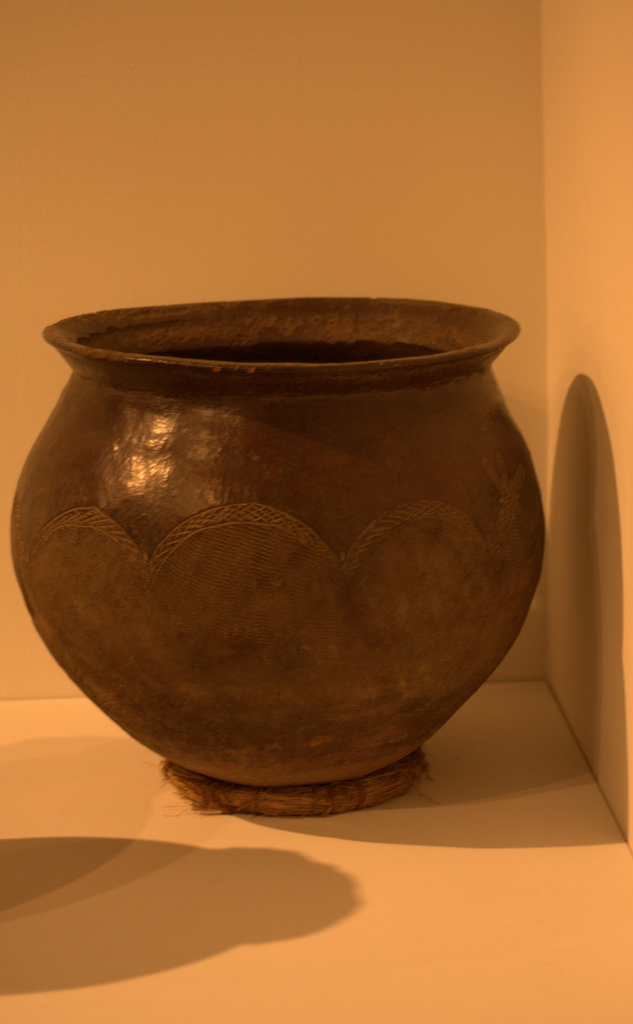
A ceramic beer-brewing pot made and used by the Lobi people, Burkina Faso.

The Lobi inhabit parts of southern Burkina Faso. According to the director of the museum in Gaoua which is considered to be the capital of the Lobi, "The Lobi is a farmer, a hunter and a herder, but above all he is a warrior". Victims of slave raids, rival clans and civil disputes, they are among the fiercest and proudest inhabitants of Burkina Faso and were constantly under attack from the Gwiriko and Kenedougou empires during the 19th century. Bakary Ouattara, brother of the founder of the Guiriko empire led an offensive against the Lobi in 1815, and despite setting fire to several villages he was eventually killed by a poisoned arrow. He was succeeded by Karakara who continued with the raids leading up to the devastating attack in 1850 where they suffered heavily and lost a great deal but were never completely defeated.

In June 1898, the French and the British made an agreement that the Lobi country would go under French jurisdiction. Attempts at controlling the peoples was difficult and the Lobi became known for their resistance using poisoned arrows in attempting to thwart the French colonial invasion.

== Animism ==
The Lobi are well documented for their animist beliefs, which involves regular interaction with ancestral and other types of spirits such as thila and kontuoursi. Interaction with these spirits commonly takes place in a thilduu (domestic shrine room), dithil (village shrine), and at other places in nature inhabited by spirits. Christian missionaries working in southern Burkina Faso have reported that an elderly man in a Lobi village once renounced the spirits in favor of Christianity by discarding his fetishes in a nearby lake. As he turned his back on the traditions, the fetishes leapt out of the lake onto his back again to reclaim him. Lobi people who convert to Christianity or Islam now usually burn their fetishes. Or, they may sell them on the market.

In Lobi animism, Thangba Yu is the creator of all living things. Lobi peoples have no direct contact with Him, but are dependent on nature spirits known as thila, invisible intermediaries that can harness their supernatural powers towards good or evil. They set rules, soser, which dictate how a Lobi should behave in important aspects of life. Similar to Greek or Roman gods, thila themselves are subject to mortal virtues and vices. In Lobi society, there is often a thildaar (village diviner) that may also act as a dithildaar (village priest; each village has only one) that interprets soser for the local community. A particularly intuitive and receptive thildaar is capable of interpreting as many as fifty or more spirits at a time.

== Architecture ==
Lobi dwellings are characterized as large rectangular or polygonal compounds known as maison soukala. They are spaced well from each other and are composed of a single vast mud banco wall and a small entrance. An entrance to a Lobi house is a relatively recent development. At many houses, there is a ladder made from a large, Y-shaped tree trunk with notched steps, which lead up to the roof where inhabitants may access an interior granary and their own rooms below. Access to individual sleeping quarters is also available inside. Only the tyuordaarkuun (or head of the household; there is no "chief" in Lobi society) can give permission to enter the house. The roof is broad and flat and forms a terrace which provides a lookout point but can also be used for sleeping in the dry season. Domestic animals have their own space, and water is gathered from a well or the river. The rooms inside a Lobi house are very dark, and the size varies in relation to function. Each wife has a room for herself and her children where meals are prepared. Large earthenware jars used to hold water or other personal belongings are often stacked up against the kitchen walls and are a testament to the owner's economic status.

== Lobi art and marriage poles ==
Since the 1970s, Lobi art has become increasingly known in the West. Various researchers investigated Lobi art in the countries of origin. At the same time, collectors, enthusiasts, ethnologists and art historians in Europe and the USA began to look at objects from this culture in their collections. As a result, this ethnic group, which had previously received little attention in museums and among private collectors, received greater attention, the highlight of which was the reconstruction of the shrine of Tyohepte Pale in the Musée du quai Branly in Paris and the special exhibition "The Discovery of the Individual", which opened in Lutherstadt Wittenberg in 2016. A special feature of Lobi art is the identifiability of individual carvers and workshops. This special feature, which distinguishes the Lobi from many other ethnic groups in Africa, was the focus of these two exhibitions and was explicitly expressed in the title of the Wittenberg exhibition "The Discovery of the Individual". The individualism significant to Lobi sculptures has its origins in their akephalic social order.

Another type of creation by the Lobi is marriage poles. Marriage poles are made from Shea trees, which have significance in the Lobi every day. These poles also have black bands made from a dye that is then connected by a vertical strip. These bands are dyed into the poles and the bark of the tree is striped leaving contrasting bands down the length of the pole. Marriage poles are made by friends of the soon to be husband and are about three meters in height. The top of the marriage pole has a fork that a piece of cloth will be tied to after the new bride has arrived. The color of the cloth be white or red show the status of the bride and her attachment. These poles are placed along the pathways to a compound (soukhala) about ten meters apart. Some poles about halfway down have a tied bundle of leaves made from Shea like the pole itself and this is called kha. The dye and the leaves are gifts from the bridegroom's father. The dye is to encourage the bride to stay put and the leaves are a medicine to bring rain therefore it brings prosperity. However, when these leaves dry it can bring harm to others who touch it spiritually. The poles are placed in red clay and small clay figures can be found at the base of some marriage poles that are half buried in a small mound and huddled together. These are just one of the various types of “art” that exist in the Lobi culture.
