= Wara language =

Wara (Ouara, Ouala) is an alternative name for either of these two Gur languages of Burkina Faso:

- Samwe language
- Paleni language

Wára may refer to:

- Upper Morehead language, a Trans-Fly language of Papua New-Guinea
