= Ouara (disambiguation) =

Ouara is an ancient city and former capital of the Ouaddai Empire of Chad.

Ouara may also refer to:

- Ouara Department, a modern administrative unit of Chad
- Ouara, Benin, a town and arrondissement in north-eastern Benin
- Ouara language, an alternative name for two related Niger-Congo languages of Burkina Faso:
  - Samwe language
  - Paleni language

== See also ==
- Wara (disambiguation)
