= Tamprusi language =

Gur language spoken in Ghana

Tampusi
- Region: Ghana
- Ethnicity: Tamprusi
- Native speakers: 16,000 (2003)
- Language family: Niger–Congo?: Atlantic–Congo; Gur; Southern; Gurunsi; Western; Tampusi

Language codes
- ISO 639-3: tpm
- Glottolog: tamp1252

Tampulma, anglicized as Tamprusi is a Mabia language (formerly Gur) of Ghana. It is primarily spoken in the Savannah Region. It is related to the languages of Deg, Sisaala and Vagla.

== Etymology ==
Tampulma refers to the language, while Tamprusi refers to the people. The general and accepted name for the language is Tampulma. The name Tamprusi Is mostly used to refer to the ethnic group who speak the language, and it is not used by native speakers to refer to the language.

== Geographic distribution ==
The Tamprusi are located in the Savannah Region, in the North Gonja District, along with the Gonja people and in the Mamprusi District, along with the Mamprusi people. The Tampulma, Hanga and Kamara are native to the west of the White Volta before the Gonja Invasion of Dagbon in the 1600s. Today, the Tamprusi, Hanga, and Kamara are part of the Gonja Traditional Council, although they are more ethnically related to the Dagombas, as they all belong to the Mabia ethnic Group. Linguistically, Hanga and Kamara are mutually intelligible with the Dagbanli language. Some Tamprusi have called for an Independent Traditional Council.

== Classification ==
The Tampulma language is one of the Gurunsi languages, a part of the Mabia language subdivision of the Niger–Congo languages. It is related to the languages of Dega, Sisaala and Vagla. Other languages in the area include Mampruli and Gonja, which is a Kwa language, are the dominant languages in these areas. There are substantial Dagbanli speakers in the area.

Just like many African languages, Tampulma has a Noun class system. For example, Tampulma is a component of Tamp- and -ulma, similar to Kiswahili, which is composed of Ki- and -swahili.

== See also ==
- Tammari language
- Mamprusi language
- Kusasi language
