= Dogoso =

Dogoso may refer to:

- Dogoso language, a Gur language of Burkina Faso
- Dɔgɔsɔ, a dialect of Escarpment Dogon (a language of Mali)

== See also ==
- Doghose language, a Gur language of Burkina Faso
