= Wara =

Wara may refer to:

== Places ==
- Wara, Poland, a village in the Subcarpathian Voivodeship, south-eastern Poland
- Wara, Gifu, a village in Gifu Prefecture, Japan
- Ouara, the former capital of the Ouaddai Empire of Chad

== Languages ==
- Samwe language, or Wara, one language of Burkina Faso
- Paleni language, or Wara, another language of Burkina Faso
- Upper Morehead language (Wára), a language of Papua New Guinea

== Other uses ==
- Wara', piety (in Arabic), a concept central to Abrahamic religions
- Wära, a defunct experimental currency of 1920s Germany
- Wur, also known as Wara or Wara Mamund, a Pashtun tribe of Afghanistan and Pakistan
- Wara art, a Japanese craft of making sculptures of rice straw, wara meaning rice straw in Japanese

== See also ==
- WARA (disambiguation)
- Ouara (disambiguation)
- Warah, a tehsil in the Qambar Shahdadkot District of Sindh, Pakistan
- Warrah, the extinct Falkland Islands wolf
