= Bariba language =

Gur language spoken in West Africa

Bariba
- Baatɔnum
- Native to: Benin, Nigeria, Togo, Burkina Faso
- Region: Borgu
- Ethnicity: Bariba people
- Native speakers: (1.1 million cited 1995–2021)
- Language family: Niger–Congo?: Atlantic–Congo; Volta-Congo; Savannas; Gur?; Bariba
- Writing system: Latin

Official status
- Recognised minority language in: Benin

Language codes
- ISO 639-3: bba
- Glottolog: baat1238

Bariba
- Person: Baatɔnu
- People: Baatɔmbu
- Language: Baatɔnum
- Country: Borgu

Bariba, also known as Baatonum, is the language of the Bariba people and was the language of the state of Borgu. The native speakers are called Baatombu (singular Baatonu), Barba, Baruba, Berba and a number of various other names and spellings.

It is primarily spoken in Benin, but also across the border in adjacent Kwara State and Niger State, a percentage of speakers are also found in Saki West local government area of Oyo State Nigeria, and some Bariba are in Togo and Burkina Faso. Welmers (1952) reported the Bariba language as spoken in the cities of Nikki, Parakou, Kandi, gwanara, Bankubu, Boriya, Ilesha Baruba and Natitingou.

== Names ==
The language can be known by different names:

- the Bariba people call their language Baatɔnum;
- the Yoruba people call the language Baruba;
- the Hausa people refer to the language as Borganci (also spelled Borganchi) after Borgu where it is spoken;
- the names in the Busa language and the Boko language are Borgu and Borgunya.

Other names include Barba or Berba.

One person who speaks Bariba is called Baatɔnu and two or more persons or speakers are called Baatɔmbu and the language of the Baatɔmbu/Borgawa people is called Baatɔnum.

== Geographic distribution ==
In Nigeria, Bariba is spoken mainly in Borgu LGA of Niger State, Saki West LGA and in Baruten LGA of Kwara state. A number of Bariba have migrated to other parts of Nigeria, including Abuja. The Bariba people are referred to as Borgawa in Hausa.

In Benin, Bariba is spoken mainly in Alibori, Donga, Atakora and Borgou departments. A number of Bariba have migrated to other parts of Benin, including Cotonou.

The language is also spoken in Burkina Faso and in the city of Sokodé in the Centrale Region of Togo.

== Classification ==
Bariba is usually classed as an independent member of the Savanna languages, but some consider it and a number of other languages, such as Miyobe, as a Gur language. However, other than Bariba, there are other unclassified Gur languages, including Miyobe, Koromfe, Viemo, and Natyoro.

== Alphabet ==
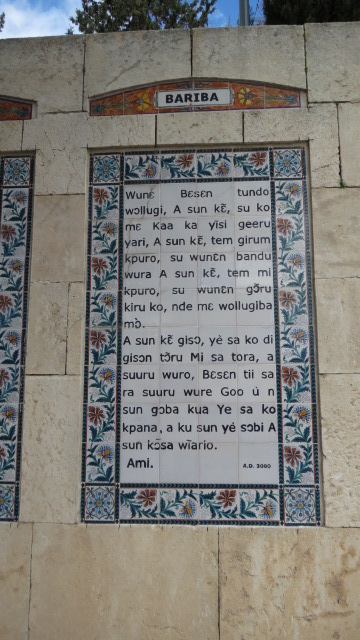
The Lord's Prayer in Bariba at the Church of the Pater Noster, Jerusalem.

There are 23 letters of Batonou alphabet:

Alphabet
Upper case	A	B	D	E	Ɛ	F	G	GB	I	K	KP	L	M	N	O	Ɔ	P	R	S	T	U	W	Y
Lower case	a	b	d	e	ɛ	f	g	gb	i	k	kp	l	m	n	o	ɔ	p	r	s	t	u	w	y

== Phonology ==
=== Consonants ===
		Labial	Alveolar	Palatal	Velar	Labio- velar	Glottal
Nasal		m	n				
Plosive	voiceless	p	t		k	k͡p	
Plosive	voiced	b	d		ɡ	ɡ͡b	
Fricative	voiceless	f	s				h
Fricative	voiced		z				
Rhotic			ɾ				
Lateral			l				
Approximant				j		w	

- /ɾ/ may be heard as a lateralized [ɺ] when preceding front vowels.
- /s, z/ may be heard as [ʃ, ʒ] when preceding front vowels.

=== Vowels ===
	Front	Central	Back
Close	i ĩ		u ũ
Close-mid	e		o
Open-mid	ɛ ɛ̃		ɔ ɔ̃
Open		a ã	

=== Tone ===
Bariba is a tonal language. Tonal patterns in Bariba have been claimed to present a challenge to the Two-Feature Model of tonal phonology.

== Nouns ==
Bariba has 7 noun classes:

1. y-class
2. t-class
3. g-class
4. w-class
5. m-class
6. s-class
7. n-class

The data was collected by William E. Welmers in August and September 1949 at Nikki, Benin.

=== y-class ===
The y-class is the largest noun class. y-class singular nouns usually in -a.

banana	àgɛ̀dɛ̀ (no pl.)
palm tree	bãã
large calabash	bàka
stick	bɔ̀ra
mosquito	bũ̀ɛ̃̀yã
character	dàà (no pl.)
tree, wood	dã̀ã̀ (pl.?)
fallen branch	dã̀kàmā
branch on a tree	dã̀kàsā
root of a tree	dã̀kpinā
habit	dēn̄dī (pl.?)
mirror	digí (pl.?)
guinea corn	dobi (pl.?)
gun	dɔ̃̀bɔ̀ra
well	dɔ̀kɔ̀ (pl.?)
male	dua
horse	duma
bag	fɔ̀rɔ̀tɔ̀, -bá
name of a month	gã̀ã̀ní (no pl.)
village gate	gàm̀bò, -bà
wall	gana
word, matter	gari (pl.?)
termite	gɛ́ma
driver ant	gɛ̃́ya
gazelle	gina
money	gobi (pl.?)
guinea fowl	gònā
death	gɔɔ (no pl.)
rain, storm	gúra
chicken	guwā, guwē
axe	gbãã
calabash	gbàká
lion	gbèsùnɔ̄, gbèsìnansu
grain of millet	gbɛyā
spirit	hùindè (pl.?)
papaya	kàràbósì, -bà
motor	kɛ̀kɛ, -bà
animal horn	kɔbā
wildcat	konā
bamboo stalk	kɔ̃sā
antelope	kpása
stew	kpee (no pl.)
star; hippopotamus	kpera
corn cake	másà, -bà
rice sprout	mɔ́ra
cow	naā
house spider	nára
scorpion	nía
female	nia
mouth	nɔɔ (pl.?)
hand	nɔbū, nɔma
peanut	sãã
offering	sàrâ
bridge	sàsarā
comb	séḿbù, -ba
hair	serā
covering	sèsèbìa
pestle	sobiā
edible seeds	sonki (pl.?)
road, path	súa
fish	sũ̀ã
bean	suìā
bracelet	sumā
judgment	tààrɛ (pl.?)
tobacco	tába
ant	tànā
mud brick	tèǹdɔ́ka
self	tīī
bee	tĩya
inheritance	túbí (pl.?)
snake	waā
rope	wɛ̃ya
straw	wĩ́ya, wĩĩ
law	wodà
small gray monkey	wonkéra
gold	wúra (no pl.)
face	wurusuā, -ɛ̄
animal, meat	yaa
needle	yabúra
cloth, robe	yasa
spear	yàsa/yɛ̀sa
pepper	yɛ̃̀ɛ̃̀kú (no pl.)
evil spirit	zínì

=== t-class ===
All forms end in -ru for t-class nouns.

cutlass	àdaru
dysentery	bàǹdúbàǹdū
sickness	baràrū
tension drum	bàraru
doorway	bàràrū
shoe	bàràrū (only pl.)
cloth	bekùrū
basket	bíréru
back	biru
salt	bɔ̀rū
river	daaru
loincloth	dɛmbɛru
house	dìrū
tooth	dondu
stalk	gãnã̀rū
arm	gã̀sèrū
rat	gɔnɔru
large wild rat	gɔ̀nɔ̀ǹguru
egg	goòsĩã̀rū
mountain	guru
rain cloud	gúrúwiru
(musical) horn	guùrū
crow	gbãgbã̀rū
field, farm	gbèrū
pot	gbɛ̃́ru
gourd	kaaru
bush cow	kɛ̀tɛ̀gbèèkìrū
male (of some animals)	kìnèrū
bread	kìràrū
love	kĩ́ru
stool	kìtàrū
box	kpàkoruru
stone	kpèrū
bed	kpenyeru
bone	kukuru
a swelling	mɔsìrū
odor	nubùrū
rabbit	satàbūr̄ū
pitfall	sɛ̃̀rū
brass, copper	sigàǹdū
grave	sìkìrū
tail	siru
stinkbug	sísíkènèrū
pounded yam	sɔ̀kùrū
work	sɔ̀mbùrū
clay for pots	sɔǹdū
mortar	soru
porridge	sòrū
toad	suréru
leg	taaru
garden hill	takàrū
bow	tendu
panther	túǹdū
nose	wɛ̃ru
head	wiru
neck	wĩ́yìrū
knife	wobùrū
pot	wókeru
night, darkness	wɔ̃̀kùrū
baboon	wompɔkɔru
red monkey	wónsũ̀ã̄rū
coldness	wóòrū
sheep	yã̀ã̀rū
market	yàburu
sacrifice	yãkùrū
place	yanyeeru
open space	yeeru
broom	yiìrū
name	yísìrū
frog	yɔ̃ɔ̃ru

=== g-class ===
Forms usually end in back vowels for g-class nouns.

chameleon	àgāmānàkí, -bà
onion	àlùmásà, -nu
goat	boo, bonu
water pot	bòo, -nu
dog	bɔ̃ɔ̃, bɔ̃nu
owl	booro, -su
lizard	bɔ̀su, -nu
infestation of lice	gã́ã́ní (pl.?)
louse	gã́ã́núkú, -nù
airplane	gogùnɔ̀, -su
robe	gɔ̃kɔ, -su
drum	gɔ̃̀ɔ̃̀, gã̀ã̀su
vehicle	gòo, -su
canoe	gòoninkū, -nu
bird	gùnɔ̄, -su
cricket	gbɔɔ̄, -nu
sandfly	kòtókámbu, -munu
spoon	kààtó, -nù
cat	kòkónyambu, -munu
doorway	kɔ́ǹdɔ, -su
mat	kɔ̃ɔ̄, -su
pig	kúrúsɔ̄, -su
partridge	kusu, -nu
leopard, cat	músúkú, -nù
antelope	nemū, neǹnu
eye	nɔnu, nɔni
bush hog	sàkɔ̄, -nu
trap	sɛ́kpɛ̀ǹkú, -nù
arrow	sɛ̃ũ̄, sɛ̃ɛ̃̀nu
pot	sirū, -su
fly	sɔnu, -su
ear	so / soa, -su
elephant	sùùnū, -su
ring	tààbu, -nu
small black ant	tàm̀bu, -munu
army ant	tàsonu, -su
hoe	tebo, -nu
shadow	tíro, -nu
parrot	titimokò, -nu
year	wɔ̃̄ɔ̃̄n, wɔ̃̄su
monkey	womu, wonnu
wind	woo, -nu
hole	wɔrū, -su
town	wuu, -su
rabbit	wùkū, -nu
leaf	wurū, -su
tongue	yara, -nu
vulture	yèbèrèkú, -nù
household	yɛnu, -su
hartebeest	yiiku, -nu

=== w-class ===
father	bàa
Bariba person or language	bàtɔ̀nù
older brother, friend	bɛɛrɛ̄
child	bìī
ulcer	bòō
hunter	bɔso
fire	dɔ̃̀ɔ̃̀
mother's brother	dùàni
rich man	gobigi
person	goo
pregnant woman	guràgi
God	gúsūnɔ̄
guard	kɔ̃so
mother	merō
older brother	mɔɔ̄
paramount chief	sènàboko
sister	sesu
sun, day	sɔ̃ɔ̃
chief	sùnɔ̄, sìnambu
moon, month	surú
person	tɔ̀nū, tɔ̀m̀bu
younger brother	wɔ́nɔ̄
guardian spirit	yãrō
slave	yòō
enemy	yíbɛ̀rɛ̀

=== m-class ===
m-class nouns often end in -m.

language	bàrūm̄
milk	bom
strength	dam
oil	gum
raised garden row	kɔ̀rɔ̄m̄
water	nim
liquor	tam
ground, dirt	tem
medicine	tìm̄
honey	tim
soap	werem
air	wom
space, room	yam
sand	yànīm̄
blood	yem

=== s-class ===
The s-class is a small noun class. Most forms are collectives and end in -su.

one (yam)	tan (teèsū)
foot	naàsu
silver	sigeèsū
iron	sísú
cotton	wɛ̃su
grass, the bush	yàkàsu

=== n-class ===
The n-class is a small noun class. Most forms are collectives and end in -nu.

one	teènū
greens	àfonu
thing	gáánu
necklace	goònū
corn	gbèrɛnu
cucumber	gbɛ̀zɛnu
okra	yàbonu

== Verbs ==
=== Aspects ===
There are 7 primary verb aspects in Bariba:

- consecutive
- habitual
- continuative
- frequentative
- imperative
- past
- past negative

There are 5 verb classes, which are grouped according to the formation of the past aspect.

=== List of verbs ===
Consecutive verb forms are given below. S denotes stative forms.

get sick	bārā
split	bɛ̄rā
push	bɔ̄rīā
dawn, whiten	būrūrā, S burīrī
taste	dēn̄dā
pass by	dōōnā
sell	dɔ̄ɔ̄rā
sleep	dūīā, S dò
come in	dūmā
pull	gāwā
chase	gīrā
beseech	kānā
break (rope)	kārā
shatter	kɔ̄ɔ̄rā
loosen	kūsīā
lie down	kpūnā, S kpī̃
receive	mūā
burn	mūārā
fight	sān̄nā
become clean	sā̃rā
name, call	sīā
pick up	sūā
wash	tīā
become black	tī̃ī̃rā, S tĩĩrī
arrive	tūnūmā
fall	wɔ̄rūmā
fill	yībīā
meet	yīn̄nā
stop	yɔ̃̄rā
leave	dērī
eat	dī (Cont. di)
forget	dūārī
hurt by burning	mɛ̄nī
help	sōmī
increase	sōsī
tether	sɔ̄rī
take a long time	tɛ̄
hand over	wɛ̃̄
blow (air)	wūrī
throw away	yārī
lay down	yī
become hard	bɔbiā, S bɔ̄(bū)
become fat	bɔriā, S bɔ̄rū
become much	dabiā, S dabī
catch up with	deèmā
become long	dẽɛ̃̀nyā, S dɛ̄ū̄
become deep	dukiā, S dúku
learn	giā
turn over	gɔsìā
turn around	gɔsìrā
gather	gurā
become high, tall	guriā, S gúru
open	kɛnīā
get down	sarā
become difficult	sɛ̃sīā, S sɛ̃̄
sit down	sinā, S sɔ̃̀
become bitter	sosiā, S sō(sū)
become red	sũɛ̃rā, S sũɛ̃rī
become tough	taàyā, S tāū
become wide	yasiā, S yasū
become cold, damp	yemiā, S yēm̄
fire (a gun)	suē
touch	babā
go around	besirā
break in two	buā
cut in two	burā
do become sweet	dorā, S
catch	gabā
become dry	gberā
tear	gĩā̃
scratch	gɔ̃rā
want	kĩã̄, S kĩ́
cut up	murā
jump, drop	surā
draw up	takā
bring	tamā
become good	wɛ̃rā, S wã
believe	wurā
come back	wúràmā
pierce	yabā
remember	yayā
play	duē
become clean	dɛ́ɛ́rā
become big	kpɛ̃́yā, S kpã́
become hot	sṹyā, S sum̄
become clear	déérē
look for	kásū
show	sɔ̃́nɔ̃́sĩ̄
warm oneself	wɔ̃́sū
cover	wukírī
peel	kɛ̄ɛ̄rī
chew, eat	tēm̄
plant	dūūrē
separate	gɔsi
dig	gbe
wait	ma, maru
study	mɛɛri
fall (of rain)	nɛ
leave, walk	sĩ
call	soku
be enough, arrive	turi
see	wa
answer	wisi
measure	yĩre
hear	nɔ̂
fix up	sɔmɛ̀, sɔm̀
dye black	wɔ̃kù
dance	yâ
enter, hurt	dū
flow	kōkū
stand up	sē, S yɔ̃̀
climb	yɔ̄
shine	baàlì
count	garì
rot	kɔ̃sì
give birth to	mâ, marù
swell	mɔsì
rejoice	yɛ̃ɛ̃rì
buy	dūē
give	kɛ̃̄
build	bānī
steal	gbɛ̄nī
prick	sɔ̄kū
tell	sɔ̃
put on the head	sɔbe, sɔ
fry	sɔmɛ, sɔm
?	su
fly	yɔ̃
tie up	bɔ̄kē
sew	yīnɛ̄
speak, say	gere
close	kɛnɛ̀
hide	kukè
frighten	narè
cook	yikè
write	yɔ̃rì
do, make	kō, S mɔ̀
kill	gô
throw down	kɔ̃̂
finish	kpê
hit	sô

== Adjectives ==
Invariable adjectives:

male	dɔ, dua
raw	goma
high	gbãrã
white	kaà
a little bit	pikó
narrow	tereré
difficult	sɛ̃sɔ

Adjectives with a class of their own, which remains the same after all nouns; singular and plural forms are like those of nouns:

t-class adjectives:

some, a few (pl. only)	binu
much, many	dabīrū
dead	gorū
male (of certain animals)	kìnèrū
old	tɔ̀kɔ̄rū
short, small (also g-class)	kpirìrū

g-class adjectives:

small	yã̀kàbū
small	píbu
short, small (also t-class)	kpirìbū

Attributive adjectives with alternants for each noun class:

big	baka-
fresh	bèku-
hard	bɔɔ̀bɔā-
fat	bɔrùbɔrū-
good	bùra-
strong	dangi-
long	dɛǹdɛn̄-
good	ge-
dry	gbebu-
new	kpaà-
white	kpikī-
female	ni-
thick	sìnùǹgi-
bitter	soòsuā-
red	sũ̀ã̄-
hot	súm-
tough	taàtaā-
black	wɔ̃kū-
cold	yĩ́re-

== Numerals ==
1	tiā
2	yìru
3	yìta
4	ǹnɛ
5	nɔ̄ɔ̄bù
6	nɔ̄ɔ̄bâ tiā
7	nɔ̄ɔ̄bá yìru
8	nɔ̄ɔ̄bá yìta
9	nɔ̄ɔ̄bá ǹnɛ
10	ɔkuru
20	yɛndu
30	tɛ̀nā
31	tɛna ka tia
31	tɛna ka tia
32	tɛna ka yiru
33	tɛna ka ita
34	tɛna ka nnɛ
35	tɛna ka nɔɔbu
36	tɛna ka nɔbaa tia
37	tɛna ka nɔba yiru
38	tɛna ka nɔba ita
39	tɛna ka nɔba nnɛ
40	weeru
41	weeru ka tia
42	weeru ka yiru
43	weeru ka ita
44	weeru ka nnɛ
45	weeru ka nɔɔbu
46	weeru ka nɔbaa tia
47	weeru ka nɔba yiru
48	weeru ka nɔba ita
49	weeru ka nɔba nnɛ
50	werakuru
51	werakuru ka tia
52	werakuru ka yiru
53	werakuru ka ita
54	werakuru ka nnɛ
55	werakuru ka nɔɔbu
56	werakuru ka nɔbaa tia
57	werakuru ka nɔba yiru
58	werakuru ka nɔba ita
59	werakuru ka nɔba nnɛ
60	wata
61	wata ka tia
62	wata ka yiru
63	wata ka ita
64	wata ka nnɛ
65	wata ka nɔɔbu
66	wata ka nɔbaa tia
67	wata ka nɔba yiru
68	wata ka nɔba ita
69	wata ka nɔba nnɛ
70	wata ka wɔkuru
71	wata ka wɔkura tia
72	wata ka wɔkura yiru
73	wata ka wɔkura ita
74	wata ka wɔkura nnɛ
75	wata ka wɔkura nɔɔbu
76	wata ka wɔkura nɔɔbu ka tia
77	wata ka wɔkura nɔɔbu ka yiru
78	wata ka wɔkura nɔɔbu ka ita
79	wata ka wɔkura nɔɔbu ka nnɛ
80	wɛnɛ
81	wɛnɛ ka tia
82	wɛnɛ ka yiru
83	wɛnɛ ka ita
84	wɛnɛ ka nnɛ
85	wɛnɛ ka nɔɔbu
86	wɛnɛ ka nɔbaa tia
87	wɛnɛ ka nɔba yiru
88	wɛnɛ ka nɔba ita
89	wɛnɛ ka nɔba nnɛ
90	wɛnɛ ka wɔkuru
91	wɛnɛ ka wɔkura tia
92	wɛnɛ ka wɔkura yiru
93	wɛnɛ ka wɔkura ita
94	wɛnɛ ka wɔkura nnɛ
95	wɛnɛ ka wɔkura nɔɔbu
96	wɛnɛ ka wɔkura nɔɔbu ka tia
97	wɛnɛ ka wɔkura nɔɔbu ka yiru
98	wɛnɛ ka wɔkura nɔɔbu ka ita
99	wɛnɛ ka wɔkura nɔɔbu ka nnɛ
100	wunɔbu
101	wunɔbu ka tia
102	wunɔbu ka yiru
103	wunɔbu ka ita
104	wunɔbu ka nnɛ
105	wunɔbu ka nɔɔbu
106	wunɔbu ka nɔbaa tia
107	wunɔbu ka nɔba yiru
108	wunɔbu ka nɔba ita
109	wunɔbu ka nɔba nnɛ
110	wunɔbu ka wɔkuru
111	wunɔbu ka wɔkura tia
112	wunɔbu ka wɔkura yiru
113	wunɔbu ka wɔkura ita
114	wunɔbu ka wɔkura nnɛ
115	wunɔbu ka wɔkura nɔɔbu
116	wunɔbu ka wɔkura nɔɔbu ka tia
117	wunɔbu ka wɔkura nɔɔbu ka yiru
118	wunɔbu ka wɔkura nɔɔbu ka ita
119	wunɔbu ka wɔkura nɔɔbu ka nnɛ
120	wuna teeru
121	wuna teeru ka tia
122	wuna teeru ka yiru
123	wuna teeru ka ita
124	wuna teeru ka nnɛ
125	wuna teeru ka nɔɔbu
126	wuna teeru ka nɔbaa tia
127	wuna teeru ka nɔba yiru
128	wuna teeru ka nɔba ita
129	wuna teeru ka nɔba nnɛ
130	wuna teeru ka wɔkuru
131	wuna teeru ka wɔkura tia
132	wuna teeru ka wɔkura yiru
133	wuna teeru ka wɔkura ita
134	wuna teeru ka wɔkura nnɛ
135	wuna teeru ka wɔkura nɔɔbu
136	wuna teeru ka wɔkura nɔɔbu ka tia
137	wuna teeru ka wɔkura nɔɔbu ka yiru
138	wuna teeru ka wɔkura nɔɔbu ka ita
139	wuna teeru ka wɔkura nɔɔbu ka nnɛ
140	wuna weeru
141	wuna weeru ka tia
142	wuna weeru ka yiru
143	wuna weeru ka ita
144	wuna weeru ka nnɛ
145	wuna weeru ka nɔɔbu
146	wuna weeru ka nɔbaa tia
147	wuna weeru ka nɔba yiru
148	wuna weeru ka nɔba ita
149	wuna weeru ka nɔba nnɛ
150	wuna weeru ka wɔkuru
151	wuna weeru ka wɔkura tia
152	wuna weeru ka wɔkura yiru
153	wuna weeru ka wɔkura ita
154	wuna weeru ka wɔkura nnɛ
155	wuna weeru ka wɔkura nɔɔbu
156	wuna weeru ka wɔkura nɔɔbu ka tia
157	wuna weeru ka wɔkura nɔɔbu ka yiru
158	wuna weeru ka wɔkura nɔɔbu ka ita
159	wuna weeru ka wɔkura nɔɔbu ka nnɛ
160	wuna wata
161	wuna wata ka tia
162	wuna wata ka yiru
163	wuna wata ka ita
164	wuna wata ka nnɛ
165	wuna wata ka nɔɔbu
166	wuna wata ka nɔbaa tia
167	wuna wata ka nɔba yiru
168	wuna wata ka nɔba ita
169	wuna wata ka nɔba nnɛ
170	wuna wata ka wɔkuru
171	wuna wata ka wɔkura tia
172	wuna wata ka wɔkura yiru
173	wuna wata ka wɔkura ita
174	wuna wata ka wɔkura nnɛ
175	wuna wata ka wɔkura nɔɔbu
176	wuna wata ka wɔkura nɔɔbu ka tia
177	wuna wata ka wɔkura nɔɔbu ka yiru
178	wuna wata ka wɔkura nɔɔbu ka ita
179	wuna wata ka wɔkura nɔɔbu ka nnɛ
180	wuna wɛnɛ
181	wuna wɛnɛ ka tia
182	wuna wɛnɛ ka yiru
183	wuna wɛnɛ ka ita
184	wuna wɛnɛ ka nnɛ
185	wuna wɛnɛ ka nɔɔbu
186	wuna wɛnɛ ka nɔbaa tia
187	wuna wɛnɛ ka nɔba yiru
188	wuna wɛnɛ ka nɔba ita
189	wuna wɛnɛ ka nɔba nnɛ
190	wuna wɛnɛ ka wɔkuru
191	wuna wɛnɛ ka wɔkura tia
192	wuna wɛnɛ ka wɔkura yiru
193	wuna wɛnɛ ka wɔkura ita
194	wuna wɛnɛ ka wɔkura nnɛ
195	wuna wɛnɛ ka wɔkura nɔɔbu
196	wuna wɛnɛ ka wɔkura nɔɔbu ka tia
197	wuna wɛnɛ ka wɔkura nɔɔbu ka yiru
198	wuna wɛnɛ ka wɔkura nɔɔbu ka ita
199	wuna wɛnɛ ka wɔkura nɔɔbu ka nnɛ
200	goobu
