= KFZ =

KFZ could refer to:

- Kephallenia Fault Zone, part of the Hellenic Trench in the Mediterranean Sea
- Kingston Free Zone, in Kingston, Jamaica
- Korfball Federation of Zambia, which manages the Zambia national korfball team
- Koromfe language, Gur language spoken in Burkina Faso and Mali
- Kukës International Airport Zayed, international airport in Kukës, Albania
