= Siti language =

Gurunsi language of Ghana

Sιtι
- Sitigo
- Region: Ghana
- Language family: Niger–Congo?: Atlantic–Congo; Gur; Southern; Gurunsi; Western; Sιtι

Language codes
- ISO 639-3: None (mis)
- Glottolog: siti1241

Sιtι (Sitigo) is a Gurunsi (Gur) language of Ghana. It has been mistaken for a dialect of Vagla.
