= Soma (community) =

Farming community in Ghana

Soma is a farming community in Sawla-Tuna-Kalba District, Savannah Region of Ghana.

The chief priest holds the custom of the land. The people of Soma are known for their unity. The youth of the community have rejected Funlani cattle from their area. They have lived in peace with their neighbours, like Jang, Kong, and Tuna.

Soma has five sectional areas; these do not include the settlements around them. However, the settlers pay full homage to the chief priest and the Vagla Koori, who is the chief of the Vagla community.

Majority of the people speak Vagla language, even thought they are different ethnic groups but the Vagla people are the majority.

They farm crops like cassava, yams, and Shea.

There is a CHPS compound which serves as their major care centre.

It also has basic and JHS School.
