= Khe =

Khe or KHE may refer to:

- Khē, Arabic letter
- Khe language, a language of Burkina Faso
- Khe, the name of the Nepali language among the Newar people
- Kaposiform hemangioendothelioma, a tumor
- Kherson International Airport, Kherson Oblast, Ukraine (IATA code)
- Khe, a raw fish dish of Koryo-saram cuisine based on the Korean dish hoe
- Khe (village), village in Nadymsky District, Russia
- "Khé?", a 2024 song by Rauw Alejandro and Romeo Santos
