= Turka language =

Gur language of Burkina Faso

Turka
- Tyurama
- Region: Burkina Faso, Ivory Coast
- Native speakers: (37,000 cited 1998)
- Language family: Niger–Congo?: Atlantic–Congo; Gur; Southern Gur; Kirma–Tyurama; Turka

Language codes
- ISO 639-3: tuz
- Glottolog: turk1306

Turka (Turuka) or Curama (Cuuramã, Tchourama, Tyurama), is a Gur language which is spoken by the Turka people in southwest Burkina Faso. Its closest linguistic relative is the Cerma language: however, they are not mutually intelligible. Due to economic, religious and educational influence, many Turka people also speak Arabic and Jula.

== Writing system ==
Alphabet
A	Ǝ	B	C	D	E	Ɛ	F	G	Gb	H	I	Ɩ	J	K	L	M	N	Ɲ	Ŋm	O	Ɔ	P	R	S	T	U	V	W	Y
a	ǝ	b	c	d	e	ɛ	f	g	gb	h	i	ɩ	j	k	l	m	n	ɲ	ŋm	o	ɔ	p	r	s	t	u	v	w	y

Nasalization is indicated with a tilde on the vowel : ⟨ã, ǝ̃, ɛ̃, ĩ, õ, ɔ̃, ũ⟩.

The tones are indicated using diacritics on the vowels or the syllabic nasals, with the acute accent for the high tone and the grave accent for the low tone.
