= Dyan =

Dyan may refer to:

== People ==
- Dyan Birch (1949–2020), British singer
- Dyan Buis (born 1990), South African Paralympic athlete
- Dyan Cannon (born 1937), American actress, director, screenwriter, producer, and editor
- Dyan Castillejo (born 1965), Filipino tennis player and sports reporter
- Dyan Sheldon, American novelist
- Marissa Dyan (born 1975), American actress

== Other uses ==
- Dyan, County Tyrone; see List of townlands of County Tyrone
- Dyan language, a Gur language of Burkina Faso
- DYAN-TV, a Philippine television station in Cebu City

== See also ==
- Dhyan Chand (1905–1979), Indian hockey player
