= Bariba =

Bariba may refer to:

- Bariba people
- Bariba language
