= Deg language =

Gur language of Ghana

Deg
- Mo
- Region: Ghana
- Native speakers: 27,500 (2003)
- Language family: Niger–Congo?: Atlantic–Congo; Gur; Southern; Gurunsi; Western; Deg

Language codes
- ISO 639-3: mzw
- Glottolog: degg1238
- ELP: Deg

Deg (also known as Aculo, Buru, Degha, Janela, Mmfo, or Mo) is a Gur (Gurunsi) language of Ghana, with also 1,100 speakers in Ivory Coast are(Tissié and Témogossié)and some towns in Ivory Coast by the border with the Nafana people.Deg people Their main settlement in Ghana, Jaman North are Bonakire and Adadiem and around Kintampo Areas

Vagla is a related language.

Deg is a stable (non-endangered) language.
