= Dogoso language =

Language

Dogoso
- Black Dogose
- Region: Burkina Faso, Ivory Coast
- Native speakers: (9,000 cited 1999)
- Language family: Niger–Congo?: Atlantic–Congo; Gur; Southern Gur; Dogoso–Khe; Dogoso

Language codes
- ISO 639-3: dgs
- Glottolog: dogo1294

Dogoso, or Black Dogose (Doghosie-Fing), is a Gur language of Burkina Faso. Other than Khe, with which it is 50–60% lexically similar, it is distant from other languages, including the neighboring Dogosé language.

Names include Bambadion-Dogoso ~ Bambadion-Dokhosié and variations on 'Black Dogose': Dorhosié-Finng, Dorossié-Fing, Dorhosié-Noirs.
