= Tusya language =

Gur language spoken in Burkina Faso

Tusya
- Wín
- Native to: Burkina Faso
- Native speakers: (39,000 cited 1995)
- Language family: Niger–Congo?: Atlantic–Congo?; Savannas?; Gur?; Tusya

Language codes
- ISO 639-3: Either: wib – Southern tsp – Northern
- Glottolog: tusi1238

Tusya, also spelled Tusiã, Tusian, Toussian and also known as Wín, is a language of Burkina Faso that is of uncertain affiliation within Niger-Congo. It may be a Gur language.

== Dialects ==
There are two dialects.

- Tir (North Tusian)
- Win (South Tusian)

The northern and southern dialects have difficulty understanding each other.

The northern dialect is spoken to the north, east, and south of Orodara. The southern dialect is spoken in and around Toussiana.
