= Gouin people =

Ethnic group in Burkina Faso and the Ivory Coast

The Gouin or Gwen (sometimes referred to as Ciraamba, Guin, Kirma, and Senufo) are an ethnic group found in Burkina Faso and the Ivory Coast. They are part of the Gur people and speak the Cerma language. Their population is estimated to be around 80,000-90,000. The Gouin farm millet, cassava, and yams. 78% of Gouin practice their traditional religion but "Multiple agencies are involved in reaching the Gouin people for Christ, and a group of churches has been established."
