= Lobi language =

Language spoken in West Africa

Lobi
- Lobiri
- Region: Burkina Faso, Ivory Coast; immigrants in Ghana
- Ethnicity: Lobi
- Native speakers: (440,000 cited 1991–1993)
- Language family: Niger–Congo?: Atlantic–Congo; Volta-Congo; Savannas; Gur; Southern Gur; Lobi–Dyan; Lobi
- Dialects: Moru

Language codes
- ISO 639-3: lob
- Glottolog: lobi1245
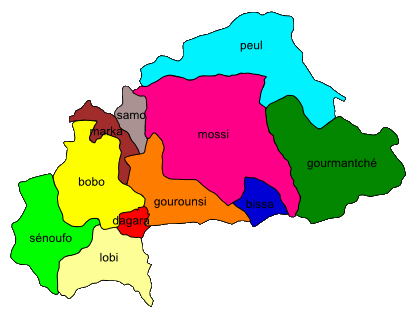
- Majority areas of northern Lobi dialects, in light yellow, on a map of Burkina Faso.

Lobi (also Miwa and Lobiri) is a Gur language of Burkina Faso, Ivory Coast and Ghana.

== Phonology ==
Consonants
	Labial	Alveolar	Palatal	Velar	Labiovelar	Glottal
Plosive	p b	t d	c ɟ	k ɡ	kp ɡb	ʔ
Aspirated	pʰ	tʰ		kʰ		
Fricative	f v	s				h
Nasal	m	n	ɲ		ŋm	
Approximant		r, l	j		w	
Glottalic	ˀb	ˀl	ˀj		ˀw	

Vowels
	Front	Central	Back
High	i iː ĩ ĩː		u uː ũ ũː
Near-high	ɪ ɪː ɪ̃ ɪ̃ː		ʊ ʊː ʊ̃ ʊ̃ː
Mid-high	e eː ẽ ẽː		o oː õ õː
Mid-low	ɛ ɛː ɛ̃ ɛ̃ː		ɔ ɔː ɔ̃ ɔ̃ː
Low		a aː ã ãː	

Additionally, Lobi distinguishes between high tone and low tone. Falling and rising tones can be found on long vowels.
