= WARA =

WARA may refer to:

- WARA (AM), a radio station (1320 AM) licensed to Attleboro, Massachusetts, United States
- WARA-FM, a radio station (88.3 FM) licensed to New Washington, Indiana, United States
- Welsh Amateur Rowing Association
- West African Research Center
- Weighted average return on assets, the collective rates of return on the various types of tangible and intangible assets of a company

== See also ==
- Wara (disambiguation)
