= Kaansa language =

Gur language of Burkina Faso

Kaansa
- Gan
- Kaansa
- Region: Burkina Faso
- Native speakers: (6,000 cited 1990)
- Language family: Niger–Congo?: Atlantic–Congo; Gur; Southern Gur; Doghose–Gan; Kaansa
- Dialects: Kaan-sa; Kpatogo-so

Language codes
- ISO 639-3: gna
- Glottolog: kaan1246

- Person: Kaan
- People: Kaamba
- Language: Kaansa

Kaansa, also known as Gan (Gã), is a Gur language of Burkina Faso.

A Latin script orthography with 29 letters (including extended characters) and three diacritics (the language has four tones) was developed beginning in the 1990s with the help of Stuart and Cathie Showalter, an American missionary couple.
