= Wara–Natyoro languages =

Atlantic–Congo language group of Burkina Faso

Wara–Natyoro
- Samu
- Geographic distribution: Burkina Faso
- Linguistic classification: Niger–Congo?: Atlantic–Congo; Savannas; Wara–Natyoro
- Subdivisions: Samwe; Paleni; Natyoro

Language codes
- ISO 639-3: –
- Glottolog: samu1243

The Wara–Natyoro or Samu languages are a small group of minor languages of Burkina Faso: Samwe, Paleni (both called Wara) and Natyoro, which are notably similar but not mutually intelligible. They were once classified as part of an expanded Gur (Voltaic) family, and are part of Blench's Savannas proposal. Güldemann (2018) tentatively classifies them within the Gur languages.
