= Turka people =

Ethnic group in Burkina Faso

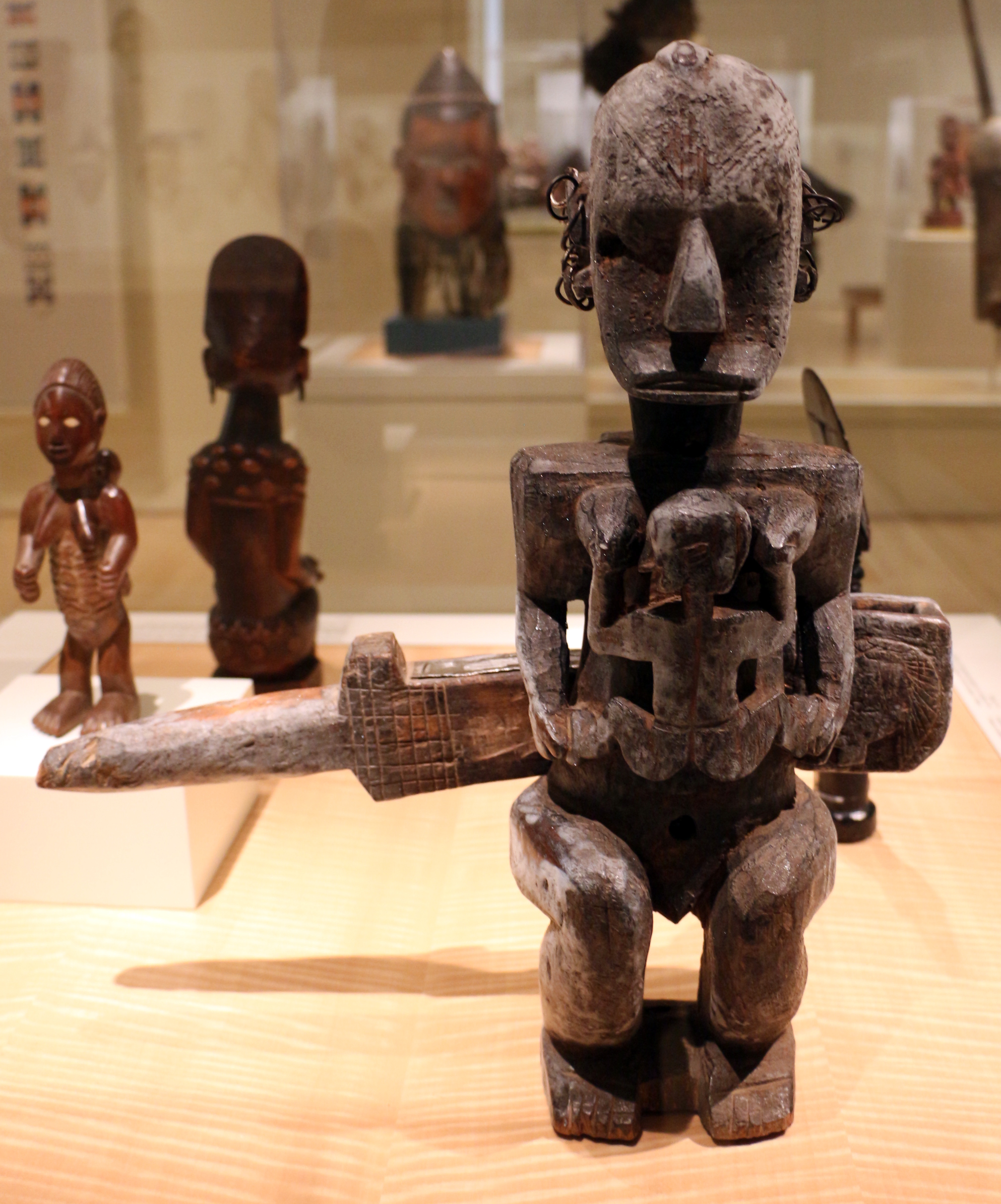
Tuka wooden sculpture

The Turka are an ethnic group in Burkina Faso, Ivory Coast, and Mali. They are part of the Gur people and speak the Turka language ("tuz"), a Gur language. The Turka population is estimated at 48,000-61,000.
