= Pobé Mengao =

The Rock Engravings of Pobe-Mengao are located in the Pobe-Mengao Department of Burkina Faso. Alongside the unique rock art, there exists man-made mounds as well as necropoles, millstones, and other archaeological artifacts such as metal tools.

== World Heritage Status ==
This site was added to the UNESCO World Heritage Tentative List on April 9, 1996, in the Cultural category.

== See also ==
Rock Art
