= Tiefo language =

Gur language of Burkina Faso

Tyefo
- cɛ̀fɔ́-mìì
- Native to: Burkina Faso
- Ethnicity: 12,000–15,000 (1995)
- Native speakers: (1,000 cited 1995)
- Language family: Niger–Congo?: Atlantic–Congo?; Savannas?; Gur?; Tyefo

Language codes
- ISO 639-3: tiq
- Glottolog: tief1243
- ELP: Tiéfo

- Person: cɛ̀fɔ̂
- People: cɛ̀fɔ́ɔ̀
- Language: cɛ̀fɔ́-mìì, cɛ̀fɔ́-mìyì

Tyefo, also spelled Cɛfɔ, Tiéfo, Kiefo, Tyeforo, is a pair of languages of Burkina Faso. It may be a peripheral member of the Gur languages, but it is of uncertain affiliation.

== Classification ==
Güldemann (2018) considers Tiefo to be of uncertain affiliation within Niger-Congo.

== Varieties ==
The two extant languages are provisionally called Tiefo-N (Tiefo of Numudara / Niafogo) and Tiefo-D (Tiefo of Daramandugu). They are mutually unintelligible. Tiefo-D is spoken in parts of the village cluster Daramandougou (Dramandougou, Daramandugu) of Comoé Province. Its phonology, morphology, some basic grammar, and lexicon were described in Kerstin Winkelmann's 1998 doctoral dissertation (in German). A full grammar by Heath and Ouattara was published online in 2021. Tiefo-N covers the extinct variety spoken in Noumoudara (Numudara) village of Houet Province, and the closely related and nearly extinct variety of Nyafogo (Gnanfogo) village. A short Tiefo-N grammar by Heath, Ouattara, and Hantgan, based on salvage fieldwork with the last two known competent speakers from Nyafogo, was published in 2017. Winkelmann's dissertation includes limited data from both Tiefo-N varieties.

Tiefo varieties were formerly spoken over a much wider area. They have been steadily declining ever since Tiefo military power was broken in an 1897 battle. Jula (Dioula) is now the dominant spoken language throughout southwestern Burkina Faso.

== Villages ==
Tiefo villages:

Official name	Village	Person	People	Notes
Nyafogo	ɲáɣáfɔ̀ɣɔ̀ⁿ	ɲáɣáfɔ̀ɣɔ̀ⁿ	ɲáɣáfɔ̀ɣɔ̀	Tiefo-N
Noumoudara	tə́ráʕāⁿ	tə́ráʕāⁿ	tə́ráʕā	Tiefo-N
Daramandougou	káɣà(-lě)	káɣà	káɣà	Tiefo-D
Me	mɛ̀ɛ́	màɣá	màɣá	formerly Tiefo-speaking
Maturku	mátòò ~ mátyòò	mát(y)òò	mát(y)òò	formerly Tiefo-speaking
Samogan	—	—	—	formerly Tiefo-speaking
Tien	—	—	—	formerly Tiefo-speaking
Kodala	—	—	—	formerly Tiefo-speaking
Koumandara	ʃíyɛ̀yⁿ	ʃíyɔ̀ⁿ	ʃíyɔ̀	formerly Tiefo-speaking
Dege-dege	dègèdègè	dègèdègè-ɲɔⁿ́	-by-ó	formerly Tiefo-speaking
Derege	dɛ̀rɛ̀gbɛ̀	dɛ̀rɛ̀gbɛ̀	dɛ̀rɛ̀gbɔ̀	formerly Tiefo-speaking
Laranfiera	làɣàⁿfyɛ̀lá	làɣàⁿfyɛ̀	làɣàⁿfyɔ̀	formerly Tiefo-speaking
Musubadugu	ʃíkìyàʕà	—	—	formerly Tiefo-speaking
Sidéradougou	—	—	—	formerly Tiefo-speaking; partially Tiefo

== Phonology ==
Consonants
	Labial	Alveolar	Palatal	Velar	Labiovelar	Pharyngeal	Glottal
Plosive	p b	t d	tʃ dʒ	k g	kp gb		(ʔ)
Fricative	f	s		ɣ		ʕ	(h)
Nasal	m	n	ɲ	ŋ	ŋm		
Approximant	w w̃	l, r	j j̃				

- /n/ is heard as [ɾ̃] intervocalically.
- /g/ is pronounced [ɣ] between two instances of the vowels [a] or [ɔ].
- /ʔ/ only occurs word-finally in a verbal clitic.
- /h/ is only attested in loanwords and sometimes in syllable boundaries between vowels.

Vowels
	Front	Central	Back
High	i iː ĩ ĩː		u uː ũ ũː
Mid-high	e eː		o oː
Mid-low	ɛ ɛː ɛ̃ ɛ̃ː		ɔ ɔː ɔ̃ ɔ̃ː
Low		a aː ã ãː	

Tiefo also has three tones; high, mid, and low.

== Grammar ==
One notable feature of Tiefo languages is a vocalic morpheme that precedes nouns under some conditions. In Tiefo-D it is ē, and it appears chiefly in postpausal position. Tiefo-N has à, è, and ò, constituting a noun-class system with a partial semantic basis. These prenominal markers are apparently unrelated to the original Gur system of noun-class suffixes. Traces of old noun-class suffixes, now frozen to stems and no longer synchronically segmentable, have been discussed by Winkelmann and other Gur specialists.

Verb phrases in Tiefo languages consist of two (Tiefo-N) or three (Tiefo-D) forms of the verb stem, plus preverbal inflectional particles marking aspect and negation. Verbs show no further morphological variation. The two Tiefo-N verb forms are called perfective and imperfective, but their distribution among clause-level inflectional categories is more complex than this suggests. Tiefo-D verbs have at most three distinct forms called perfective, imperfective, and base, but some verbs merge imperfective and base. In both languages, the forms of a given verb are morphophonologically related to each other by some combination of vocalic mutation, tonal shift, and/or suffixation.

== See also ==
- Tiefo word list (Wiktionary)
