= Cerma language =

Gur language of Burkina Faso

Cerma
- Gouin
- Kirma
- Region: Burkina Faso, a few in Ivory Coast
- Native speakers: 53,600 (2009)
- Language family: Niger–Congo?: Atlantic–Congo; Gur; Southern Gur; Kirma–Tyurama; Cerma

Language codes
- ISO 639-3: cme
- Glottolog: cerm1238

Cerma (Kirma) is a Gur language of Burkina Faso. It is spoken by the Gouin people (sometimes called Ciramba or Gouin (Gwe, Gwen)).

== Phonology ==
=== Consonants ===
Consonants
		Labial	Dental	Palatal	Dorsal/ Laryngeal	Labial- velar
Plosive/Affricate	voiceless	p	t̪	c	k	kp
Plosive/Affricate	voiced	b	d̪	ɟ	g	gb
Nasal		m	n̪			
Continuant	voiceless	f	s̪		h	
Continuant	voiced	v	(z̪)	j	w	
Lateral			l̪			
Trill			r̪			
Archiphoneme			N			

- Although /w/ is phonetically a labial-velar consonant, Lauber includes it in the dorsal/laryngeal column because its distribution is more like /k/ or /h/ than the labials or labial-velars.
- Lauber excludes /l̪/, /r̪/, and //N// from the continuant section because their distributions are different.
- /l̪/ is nasalized [l̃] "in a nasal context" and a voiceless alveolar lateral [l̥] at the end of an utterance.
- /r̪/ is a nasal tap [ɾ̪̃] "in a nasal context" and a voiceless tap [ɾ̥] at the end of an utterance.
- The archiphoneme //N// has the following allophones:
  - [m] before /b/, /p/, and /m/
  - [ɱ] before /f/ and /v/
  - [n̪] before /t̪/, /d̪/, /s̪/, and /n̪/
  - [ɲ] before /ɟ/, /c/, and front vowels
  - [ŋ] before /k/, /g/, /h/, /w/, and the central and back vowels
  - [ŋ͡m] before /k͡p/ and /g͡b/
- /Nj/ also becomes [ɲ].
- Hürlimann and Pike (1985) note that the palatals are affricates, using the symbols ⟨č⟩ and ⟨j⟩.

=== Vowels ===
Vowels
	Front	Central	Back
Close	i		u
Mid	e		o
Open-mid	ɛ		ɔ
Open		a	

- Lauber treats nasalization as a feature of the syllable, not the vowel.
- In closed syllables, /i, u/ become near-close [ɪ, ʊ].
- In the last syllable of the nuclear element of the phonological word before /r/, /e, ɔ, o/ are lengthened [eː, ɔː, oː].
