= Khisa language =

Gur language spoken in West Africa

Khisa
- Region: Ivory Coast, Burkina Faso
- Native speakers: (8,000 cited 1991)
- Language family: Niger–Congo?: Atlantic–Congo; Gur; Southern Gur; Doghose–Gan; Khisa

Language codes
- ISO 639-3: kqm
- Glottolog: khis1238
- ELP: Khisa

Khisa (/khi-sɛ/ or /khi-sa/), also known as Komono, Khi Khipa and Kumwenu, is a Gur language of the Ivory Coast and Burkina Faso. It is listed as threatened by the Endangered Languages Project due to many speakers preferring Jula for economic and educational reasons.
