= Burkina Sign Language =

Deaf sign language of Ouagadougou

- Mossi Sign Language
- Native to: Burkina Faso
- Region: Ouagadougou
- Language family: Deaf-community sign language

Language codes
- ISO 639-3: None (mis)
- Glottolog: burk1234

Burkina Sign Language (French: Langue des signes burkinabé), also known as Mossi Sign Language (Langue des signes mossi) is the indigenous sign language of the Deaf community in the capital of Burkina Faso, Ouagadougou. Deaf education in Burkina is in American Sign Language (ASL) and Burkina Faso Sign Language is considered to be an ASL based creole language.
