= Kourinion Department =

Coordinates: 10.9667°N 4.8167°W

Kourinion Kourignon
- Department
- Kourinion
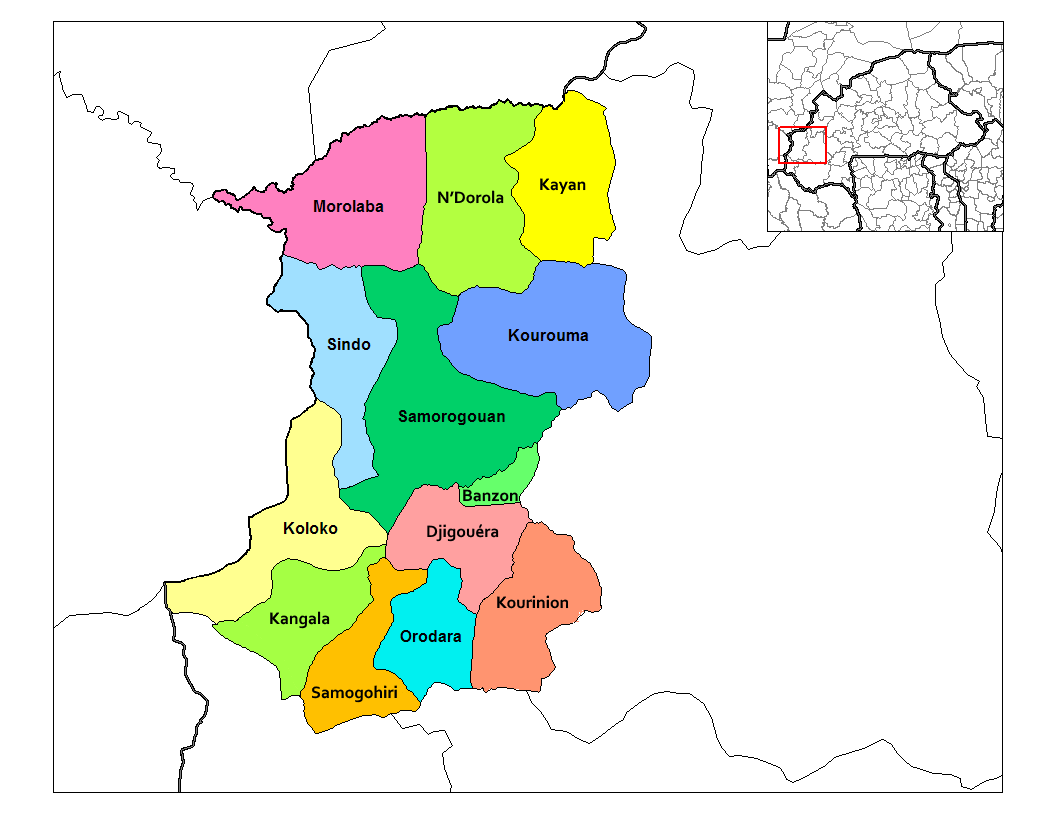
- Kourinion Department location in the province
- Country: Burkina Faso
- Province: Kénédougou Province
- Time zone: UTC+0 (GMT 0)

Kourinion, also written Kourignon, is a department or commune of Kénédougou Province in south-western Burkina Faso. Its capital lies at the town of Kourinion.
