= Koromfe language =

Gur language spoken in Burkina Faso and Mali

Koromfé
- Native to: Burkina Faso, Mali
- Native speakers: 200,000 (2001)
- Language family: Niger–Congo?: Atlantic–Congo; Gur; Northern; Koromfé
- Dialects: Koromba; Fulse

Language codes
- ISO 639-3: kfz
- Glottolog: koro1298

Koromfe or Koromfé is a Gur language spoken in a U-shaped area around the town of Djibo, in the north of Burkina Faso and southeastern Mali, bordering Dogon Country.

== Geographic Distribution ==
The Koromfé language is spoken in the provinces of Bam and Sanmatenga in the Centre-Nord Region, in the Provinces of Loroum and Yatenga (Titao Subdistrict) in the Nord Region and in the Soum Province of the Sahel Region (Djibo–Aribinda Subdistrict).

== Dialects ==
Koromfé has two dialects: The western dialect (also known as Koromba or Kurumba) and the eastern dialect (Fulse or Folse). There are two major dialect areas, most conveniently termed East and West. The traditional centre of the Eastern area is Aribinda and of the Western area Pobé-Mengao. The western area is also known as Lorom (with two short close mid vowels), which should not be confused with the recently created province of Loroum centred on Titao. (Titao is ethnically Kurumba.) The grammar of Rennison (1997) describes the Western dialect.

== Phonology ==
		Labial	Alveolar	Palatal	Velar	Glottal
Nasal		m	n		ŋ	
Plosive	voiceless	p	t		k	
Plosive	voiced	b	d		ɡ	
Fricative	voiceless	f	s			h
Fricative	voiced	v	z			
Approximant		w	l	j		
Rhotic			r			

The alveolar flap [ɾ] is an allophone of /d/, which occurs as [d] only word-initially and after nasal consonants. There also exists a spirantised allophone of /ɡ/, i.e. [ɣ]; phonetic [ɡ] only occurs word-initially, after a nasal consonant, or between two ATR high vowels. Before nasal vowels the approximants /j/ and /w/ are nasalised, and the nasalised /j/ in slow, careful speech can even harden to [ɲ]. However, there is no phonemic palatal series of consonants in Koromfe.

The vowel system comprises 5 [-ATR] vowels /ɪ ɛ a ɔ ʊ/ and their [+ATR] counterparts /i e ʌ o u/. All vowels occur both orally and (context-free) nasally, and long and short, giving 40 full vowels. There is also a schwa [ə] which alternates with zero and disappears in faster, casual speech.

Koromfe is the only Gur language, and one of only five Niger-Congo languages, listed in the World Atlas of Language Structures that is not tonal.

== Writing system ==
Koromfé has no written form. A 2007 dictionary uses a IPA based orthography with "y" replacing "j".
