= Sininkere language =

Language of Burkina Faso

Sininkere
- Native to: Burkina Faso
- Native speakers: (6,000 cited 1999)
- Language family: Niger–Congo: Mande; Northwestern Mande (Samogo-Soninke); Northwest proper; Soninke-Bobo; Soninke-Bozo; Soninke; Sininkere

Language codes
- ISO 639-3: skq
- Glottolog: sini1242
- ELP: Sininkere

Sininkere (Silinkere) is a dialect of the Soninke language spoken in Burkina Faso.
