= Viemo language =

Gur language spoken in Burkina Faso

Viemo
- Native to: Burkina Faso
- Native speakers: (8,000 cited 1995)
- Language family: Niger–Congo?: Atlantic–Congo?; Savannas?; Gur?; Viemo

Language codes
- ISO 639-3: vig
- Glottolog: viem1243

Viemo, also known as Vige, Vigué, Vigye, is a language of Burkina Faso. Vigué is the term for the ethniciity while Viemo is the name of the language. It may be related at a higher level to the Gur language family, but its exact affiliation within Niger–Congo languages is not yet established . It is spoken in Karangasso-Vigué Department and in neighbouring provinces.

The central village, said to be the origin of other villages, is Karangasso-Vigué, which is distinct from Karangasso-Sembla, an important village of Sembla people (speakers of Seenku language) west of Bobo Dioulasso. Other important ethnic Vigué villages are Klesso, Dérégouan, and Dan. Speakers are called Vigué by Dyula speakers.

== Phonology ==
Consonants
	Labial	Alveolar	Palatal	Velar	Labiovelar
Plosive	p b	t d	c ɟ	k	kp gb
Fricative	f v	s		x	
Nasal	m	n	ɲ	ŋʷ	
Approximant	w	l	j		

Vowels
	Front	Central	Back
High	i iː ĩ ĩː		u uː ũ ũː
Mid-high	e eː		o oː
Mid-low	ɛ ɛː ɛ̃ ɛ̃ː		ɔ ɔː ɔ̃ ɔ̃ː
Low		a aː ã ãː	

Viemo also has three tones; high, mid, and low.
