= Khe language =

Gur language spoken in Burkina Faso

Khe
- Kheso
- Region: Burkina Faso
- Native speakers: (1,300 cited 1983)
- Language family: Niger–Congo?: Atlantic–Congo; Gur; Southern Gur; Dogoso–Khe; Khe

Language codes
- ISO 639-3: kqg
- Glottolog: khee1238
- ELP: Khe

Khe is a Gur language of Burkina Faso. Other than Dogoso, is distant from other languages
