= Doghose language =

Gur language spoken in Burkina Faso

Dogosé
- Doghose
- Region: Burkina Faso
- Native speakers: (20,000 cited 1991)
- Language family: Niger–Congo?: Atlantic–Congo; Gur; Southern Gur; Doghose–Gan; Dogosé

Language codes
- ISO 639-3: dos
- Glottolog: dogo1295

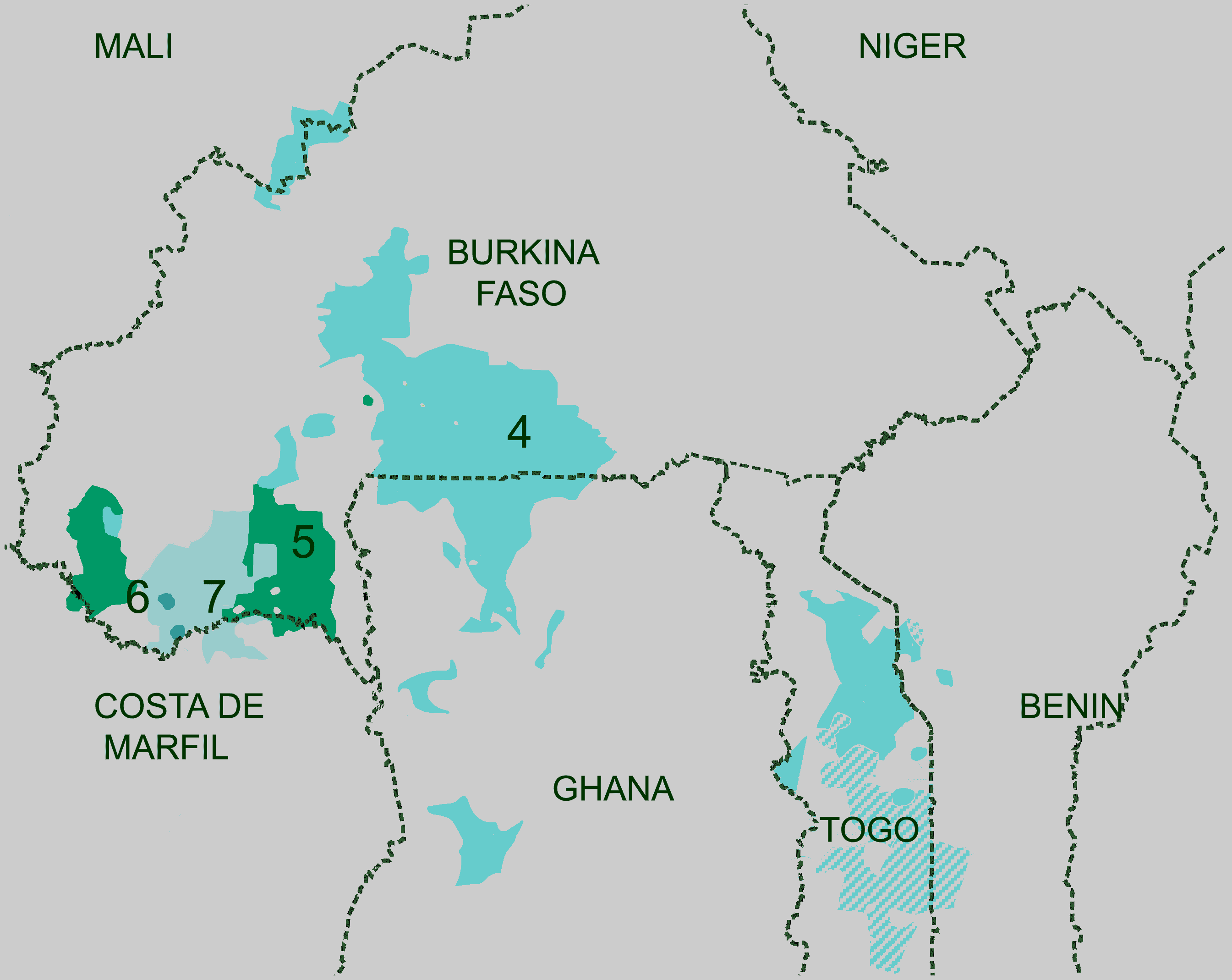
Map place of 7 is where Doghose-Gan is primarily found

Dogosé, or Doghose, is a Gur language of Burkina Faso.

There are multiple spellings of this name, due to the difficulties of spelling the second consonant, [ɣ]. Dogosé is currently preferred, but traditional Doghose is found in much of the literature. Rarer spellings are (Doro) Doghosié, Dokhosié, Dorhossié, Dorhosye, Dorosie, Dorossé and, with a different suffix, Dokhobe, Dorobé.

Dialects, which are close, are Klamaasise, Mesise, Lutise, Gbeyãse, Sukurase, Gbogorose.
