= Dyan language =

Gur language of Burkina Faso

Dyan
- Region: Burkina Faso
- Native speakers: (14,000 cited 1991)
- Language family: Niger–Congo?: Atlantic–Congo; Gur; Southern Gur; Lobi–Dyan; Dyan
- Dialects: Zanga

Language codes
- ISO 639-3: dya
- Glottolog: dyan1251

Dyan (Dan, Dian, Dya, Dyane, Dyanu) is a Gur language of Burkina Faso. Zanga is either a divergent dialect or a closely related language.
