= Paleni language =

Niger–Congo language of Burkina Faso

Paleni
- Wara
- Region: Burkina Faso
- Ethnicity: Palaba
- Native speakers: 260 (2012)
- Language family: Niger–Congo?: Atlantic–Congo?; Gur?; Wara–Natyoro; Paleni

Language codes
- ISO 639-3: pnl
- Glottolog: pale1262

Paleni (Paléni), also known as Wara (Ouara, Ouala), is a minor Niger–Congo language spoken in the village of Faniagara in Burkina Faso.
