= Natioro language =

Gur language of Burkina Faso

Natyoro
- Koo’ra
- Region: Burkina Faso
- Native speakers: (2,400 cited 1991)
- Language family: Niger–Congo?: Atlantic–Congo?; Gur?; Wara–Natyoro; Natyoro

Language codes
- ISO 639-3: nti
- Glottolog: nati1243
- ELP: Natioro

Natioro (Natyoro), or Koo’ra, is a Gur language of Burkina Faso spoken by a caste of blacksmiths.

== Geographical distribution ==
Natioro is spoken in four main villages to the west of Banfora, in Léraba Province. These four villages are Kawara and Timba, which are west of Sindou, and Sindoukoroni and Dinaoro, which are north of Sindou.

== Sample vocabulary ==
Sample basic vocabulary of Natioro dialects:

Dialect	eye	ear	nose	tooth	tongue	mouth	blood	bone	tree	water	eat	name
Dinaoro	ɲã́ːpjá	ɲã̀ŋwɛ̀ː	mṹnṹpwã́ː	ɲĩ́nã́wã́	nã́mã́sáː	pɛ́lɛ́	sjã̀ːmɪ̃́	kàːkwɛ̀ː	sṹmbèː	lǔ	àwɔ́lɪ́ː	ɲĩ́nã́
Timba	ɲǎːpéjá	ɲàŋwà	mṹnṹpwã́	ɲĩ́nã́ŋɟɛ̄	nɛ̃́mɛ̃́sáː	pɛ́lːɛ̄	sjã́ːmĩ́	kàːkwà	súmwà	lwā	àʔɔ́lɪ̄	ɲĩ́nã́
Kawara	ɲã̀pjá	ɲã́wà	mũ̀nūpwã́	ɲĩ̀nāwã́	nɛ̀mɛ̄sá	pɛ̀lɛ́	ʃã̀mí	kàkwá	súmwà	lwá	ǎwɔ́ljàbú	ɲĩ̀ná
Niansogoni	ɲĩ́kúpjé	jɪ̀pã̌	mṹnũ̀kũ̌	ɲínːáː	lámːjáː	nã́	tə́mǎ	nã́ŋkwáː	ʃjɛ̂	nṹmṹː	ìwɔ́nːã́	ínːã́
Negeni	ɲĩ́kúpjéː	ĩ̀pã̌	ɲũ̀nĩ̀kǐ	hĩ̀ná	ɲĩ́míjáː	nã́ː	tĩ́mã́ː	nã́mkwáː	sjě	ɲĩ́mĩ́ː	íwã̀nĩ̀	ʔĩ́nːã́ː
Sourani	jùgpjé	jìpá	múrkà	jìrwɛ́	nã̀mjá	mùná	tàgwá	nàmákùrá	ʃjé	nũ̀má	kpìsíwōbòrá	mìrwá
Faniagara	ɲã́pʊ̀ːnã́	ífwã̀nã́	ʔṹnṹfã̀nã́	ĩ́ndáːnã̀	nĩ́ŋsáːnã̄	nã́ːnã̀	tímĩ́nĩ́	kʊ́kánã̄	síːkénã́	nĩ́mĩ́nĩ̀	ɛ̀wòlòjɛ́	ínã́ːnã̄

== See also ==
- Natioro word lists (Wiktionary)
