= Vagla language =

Gur language spoken in Ghana

Vagla
- Region: Ghana
- Native speakers: 14,000 (2003) (may include speakers of Siti)
- Language family: Niger–Congo?: Atlantic–Congo; Gur; Southern; Gurunsi; Western; Vagla

Language codes
- ISO 639-3: vag
- Glottolog: vagl1239 Vagla

Vagla is a Gurunsi (Gur) language of Ghana with about 14,000 speakers. It is spoken in a number of communities in the Savannah Region (part of the Northern Region before 2018), Ghana. Such communities includes: Bole, Sawla, Tuna, Soma, Gentilpe, and Nakwabi. The people who speak this language are known as Vaglas, one of the indigenous tribes around that part of the Northern Region, which were brought under the Gonja local administration system "Gonjaland" by British Colonial Rulers under their Centralised System of Governance.

== Phonology ==
=== Consonants ===
Consonants
		Labial	Alveolar	Palatal	Velar	Labial- velar	Glottal
Plosive	voiceless	p	t	c	k	kp	
Plosive	voiced	b	d	ɟ	g	gb	
Nasal		m	n	ɲ	ŋ	ŋm	
Fricative	voiceless	f	s				h
Fricative	voiced	v	z				
Approximant			l	j		w	

=== Vowels ===
Vowels
	Front	Central	Back
Close	i		u
Close-mid	ɪ		ʊ
Mid	e		o
Open-mid	ɛ	(ʌ)	ɔ
Open		a	

- Blench uses /ʌ/, which is described as a -ATR counterpart of /a/.
- All vowels can be long or short. Two similar vowels are not treated as a long vowel due to tone patterns.

=== Tones ===
Vagla has four tones: rising, falling, and two level tones. It also has downstep. Nasals and laterals can also carry tones.

== Orthography ==
Vagla uses ⟨i⟩ to represent both /i/ and /ɪ/, and it uses ⟨u⟩ to represent /u/ and /ʊ/.

Nasalization is represented by a following ⟨h⟩, e.g., sɛɛ 'to agree' and sɛɛh 'to carve'.
