= Samwe language =

Gur language of Burkina

Samwe
- Wara
- Region: Burkina Faso
- Ethnicity: Samba
- Native speakers: (4,500 cited 1993)
- Language family: Niger–Congo?: Atlantic–Congo?; Gur?; Wara–Natyoro; Samwe

Language codes
- ISO 639-3: wbf
- Glottolog: wara1292
- ELP: Wara

Samwé (samoe), also known as Wara (ouara, ouala), is a Gur language of Burkina Faso. Dialects are Negueni-Klani, Ouatourou-Niasogoni, and Soulani. Niasogoni speakers have difficulty with Negueni, but not vice versa.

== Phonology ==
=== Consonants ===
Consonants
		Labial	Alveolar	Palatal	Velar	Labial- velar
Plosive	voiceless	p	t	c	k	kp
Plosive	voiced	b				
Nasal		m	n			
Fricative		f	s			
Flap			ɾ			
Approximant			l	j		w

- /b/ can be lenited to [β̞] between vowels.
- /t/ has a free variant [d] after nasals, vowels, and other consonants.
- /c/ is voiced [ɟ] after nasals and between vowels.
- /k/ is often [g] or [ɰ] between vowels. It tends to stay voiceless at morpheme boundaries.
- /kp/ becomes voiced [gb] between vowels or after nasals. /kp is not allowed before /u/.
- [ʔ], which is not phonemic, occurs intervocalically between the same vowel.
- /f/ is always voiceless.
- /s/ is voiced [z] intervocalically and after nasals, [ʃ] before /ia/ and /ie/, and [s] elsewhere. /s/ can be lenited to [ɹ], which Ouattara represents as [z̞]. As with stops, voicing and lenition are in free variation.
- /ɾ/ can also be realized as [r] or [ɹ]. /ɾ/ is also in free variation with /n/ in some words. Sometimes, /ɾn/ becomes /nn/ or /rr/.
- /l/ and /n/ are contrastive, but roughly 20 words have /l~n/ in free variation.

=== Vowels ===
Samwe has 20 vowels: 7 short oral vowels, 7 long oral vowels, 3 short nasal vowels, and 3 long nasal vowels.

Oral vowels
	Front		Central		Back	
	short	long	short	long	short	long
Close	i	iː			u	uː
Close-mid	e	eː			o	oː
Open-mid	ɛ	ɛː			ɔ	ɔː
Open			a	aː		

Nasal vowels
	Front		Central		Back	
	short	long	short	long	short	long
Close	ĩ	ĩː			ũ	ũː
Open			ã	ãː		

Samwe has two types of vowel harmony: ATR harmony and front-back harmony. /ɛ, ɔ/ do not occur in stems with /i, e, o, u/. Front and back vowels (/i, e/ and /u, o) do not co-occur in disyllabic imperative verb stems, but this rule is not followed in other verb forms. /a/ is neutral in both types.
