= Gur languages =

Branch of the Niger–Congo languages

Gur
- Central Gur; Mabia
- Geographic distribution: Benin, Burkina Faso, Ghana, Ivory Coast, Mali, Niger, Togo, Nigeria
- Linguistic classification: Niger–Congo?: Atlantic–Congo; Volta–Congo; Savannas; Gur
- Subdivisions: Northern; Southern

Language codes
- Glottolog: cent2243 Gur + Waja–Jen
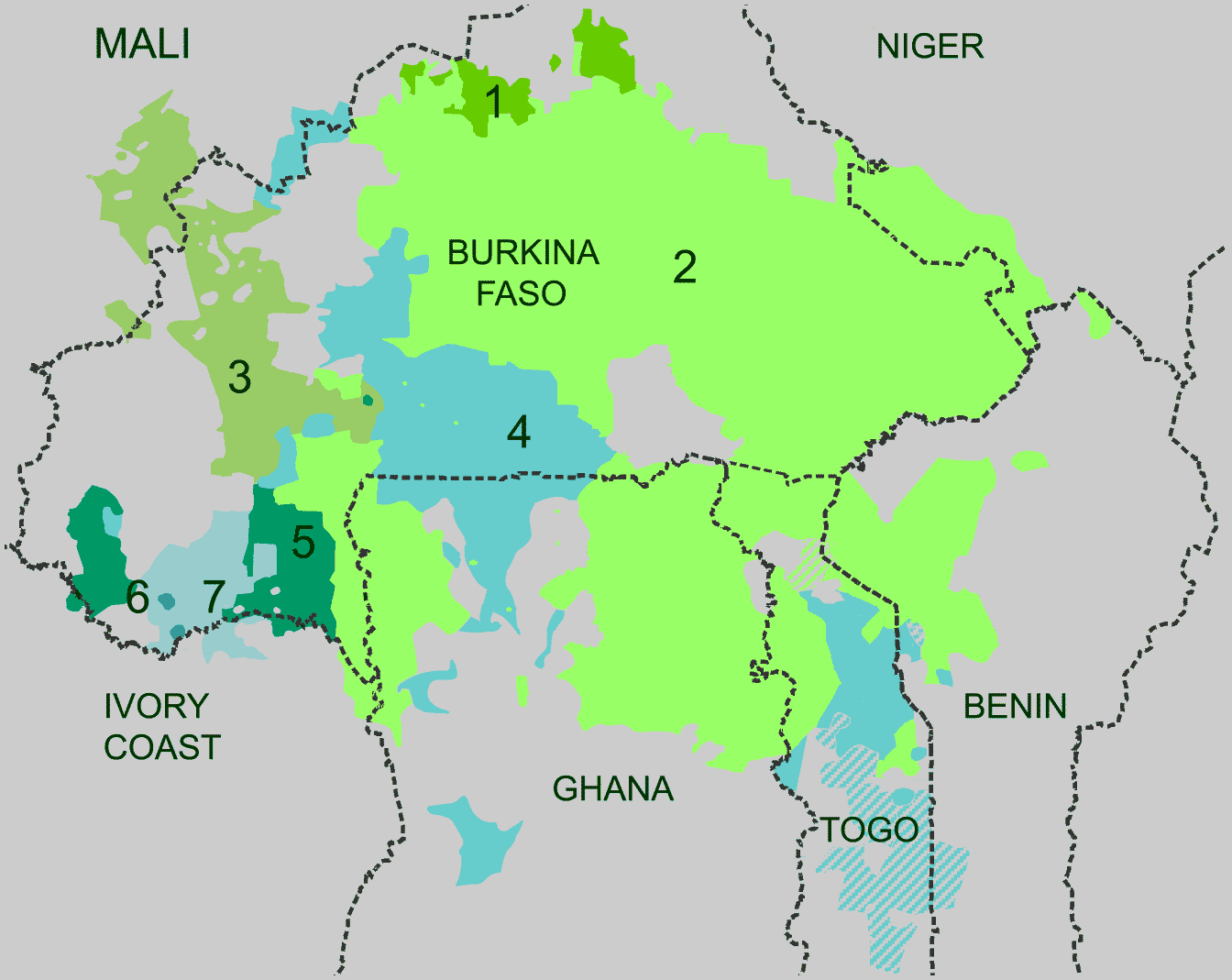
- 1. Koromfé; (Northern): 2. Oti–Volta; (Northern): 3. Bwamu; (Northern): 4. Gurunsi; (Southern): 5. Kirma–Lobi; (Southern): 6. Dogoso–Khe; (Southern): 7. ? Doghose–Gan; (Southern)

The Gur languages, also known as Central Gur or Mabia, belong to the Niger–Congo languages. They are spoken in the Sahelian and savanna regions of West Africa, namely: in most areas of Burkina Faso, and in south-central Mali, northeastern Ivory Coast, the northern halves of Ghana and Togo, northwestern Benin, and southwestern Niger.

== Typological features ==
Like most Niger–Congo languages, the ancestor of Gur languages probably had a noun class system; many of today's languages have reduced this to a system of nominal genders or declensions or no longer have a class system. A common property of Gur languages is the verbal aspect marking. Almost all Gur languages are tonal, with Koromfé being a notable exception. The tonal systems of Gur languages are rather divergent. Most Gur languages have been described as following the model of a two tone downstep system, but the languages of Oti-Volta branch and some others have three phonemic tones.

== History of study ==
Sigismund Wilhelm Koelle first mentions twelve Gur languages in his 1854 Polyglotta Africana, which represent ten languages in modern classification. Notably, he correctly identified these languages as being related to one another; his 'North-Eastern High Sudan' corresponds to Gur in modern classification.

Map showing the Mabia Languages that are currently under study

The Gur family was previously called Voltaic, following the French name (langues) Voltaïques (named after the Volta River). It was once considered to be more extensive than it is often regarded today, including the Senufo languages and a number of small language isolates. The inclusion of Senufo within Gur has been rejected by many linguists, including Tony Naden. Williamson and Blench place Senufo as a separate branch of Atlantic–Congo, while other non-Central Gur languages are placed somewhat closer as separate branches within the Savannas continuum.

Kleinewillinghöfer (2014) notes that the closest relatives of Gur appear to be several branches of the obsolete Adamawa family, since many "Adamawa" languages in fact share more similarities with various (Central) Gur languages than with other Adamawa languages. He proposes that early Gur-Adamawa speakers had cultivated guinea corn and millet in a wooded savanna environment.

== Classification ==
The regions on the map denote regional distribution of the Central Gur languages. The tree-diagram below denotes the relations between these languages and their closest relatives:

- ? Greater Gur (or Gur–Adamawa)
  - Central Gur (or Mabia)
    - Northern Gur
        - (1.) Oti–Volta (28 languages, including Mooré, Mamprusi, Dagbani, and Gurma)
        - (2.) Bwa (or Bwamu, Bomu, Bobo-Wule)
      - (3.) Koromfé (or Koromfe)
    - Southern Gur
        - (4.) East Mabia
          - Gurunsi (or Grũsi) (20 languages, including Kabiye)
        - (5.) Kirma–Lobi
          - Kirma–Tyurama (Cerma, Turka)
          - Lobi–Dyan (Lobi, Dyan)
      - (6.) Doghose–Gan (Dogosé, Kaansa, Khisa)
      - (7.) ? Dogoso–Khe (Dogoso, Khe)
  - ? Waja–Kam
  - ? Leko–Nimbari
  - ? (possibly other putative Adamawa languages)

The position of Dogoso–Khe in Southern Gur is not clear; it is not closely related to other members of the branch.

=== Bodomo (2017) ===
Bodomo (2017) refers to the entire Central Gur group as Mabia. The term Mabia is a portmanteau of the two lexical innovations ma- 'mother' + bia 'child'.

The following is a classification of the Mabia (or Central Gur) languages from Bodomo (2017), as cited in Bodomo (2020). Bodomo divides Mabia into three primary branches, namely West, East, and Central.

- Mabia
  - East (or Gurunsi, Grũsi)
    - Kasem
    - Sisaala
    - Kabiye
  - West (or Gurma)
    - Bassari
    - Konkomba
    - Moba
  - Central
    - Dagaare
      - Dagaare
      - Wali
      - Birifor
      - Safaliba
    - North
      - Moore
    - Mid-Central
      - Mabiene
      - Frafra (Nankanè)
      - Nabit
    - South
      - Dagbani
      - Mampruli
      - Nanuni (a dialect of Dagbani)
    - Kusaal
      - Kusaal (Kusasi)
      - Talni
    - Buli–Konni
      - Buli
      - Konni
    - Hanga–Kamara
      - Hanga
      - Kamara

The term Mabia, instead of Gur, is also used by Naden (2021).

Naden (2021) lists the languages of the Southern/Eastern Mabia group as Dagbani, Hanga, Kantoosi, Kamara, Kusaal (Kusasi), Mampruli (Mamprusi), Nabit, Nanun/Nanuni (also considered a dialect of Dagbani), and Talni.

== Comparative vocabulary ==
Sample basic vocabulary of Gur languages:

Note: In table cells with slashes, the singular form is given before the slash, while the plural form follows the slash.

| Language (Village) | eye | ear | nose | tooth | tongue | mouth | blood | bone | tree | water | eat | name |
|---|---|---|---|---|---|---|---|---|---|---|---|---|
| Proto-Central Gur | | | *me (Oti-Volta, Gurunsi) | *ye (Gurunsi, Kurumfe) | | | *ñam, *ñim (Oti-Volta, Kurumfe) | *ʔob, *ʔo | *tɪ (Oti-Volta, Gurunsi) | *ni, *ne; *nã (Oti-Volta, Gurunsi) | *di | *yɪɗ, *yɪd (Oti-Volta, Gurunsi) |
| Kirma | yifelle / yifiŋa | tuŋu / tunni | mɛlle / miẽŋa | nyilaŋu / nyiene | dyumelle / dyumiẽŋa | nuŋu / nunni | tammã | kogwoŋu / kogonne | tibiu / tibinni | humma | w | yere |
| Tyurama | yisiri / yinya | twõgo / tõnya | meare / miaga | nyirogu / nyiranya | nambene / namblaga | nogu / nõnya | toama | kukugogu / kukunya | tibikugu / tibinyinya | huma | owu | yiri / yiga |
| Proto-Gurunsi | *s₁l | *di₂/e/o(l/n) | *mi₁/e/o | | *de/u₂(l) | *no₂/i₁ | *ca | | *ti₂/e | *le/a/o; *ni₂/a/o | *di₁ | *yi₂(l/d) |
| Lyélé | yir / yira | zyẽ / zyã | myél / myéla | yéél / yéla | médyolo / médyaalé | nyi / nya | gyal | ku / kur | kyoo / kyémé | nẽẽ | gyu | yil / yila |
| Proto-Oti–Volta | *ni / *nun | *tʊ | *me | *n / *n | *lɪm / *lam; *z₂ɪ (?) | *noː | *z₁ɪm | *kob; *kpab | *yi / *tiː | *ɲa | *dɪ | *yi / *yʊ |
| Dagbani | nini | tiba (pl.) | nyee | nyini | zinli | noli | ʒim | kɔbili | tia | kom | di | yuli |
| Gourmanchéma (Fada N’Gourma) | numbu / nuni/nini | tubli / tuba | miali / miana | nyenli / nyena | lambu / landi | nyoabu / nyoane | soama | kpabli / kpaba | tibu / tidi | nyima | di | yeli / yela |
| Mossi [Moore] | nifu / nini | tubre / tuba | nyõre / nyüya | nyende / nyena | zilemde / zilma | nore / nwɛya | zim | kõbre / kõaba | tiɣa / tise | kom | di | yure / yuya |
| Frafra | nifo / nini | tʊbre / tʊba | yõore / yõa | yẽnnɛ / yẽna | zɪlɪŋa / zɪlɪsɪ | nõorɛ / nõa | zɪɪm | kõbrɛ / kõba | tɪa / tɪɪsɪ | ko'om | di | yʊ'ʊrɛ / yʊ'ʊra |
| Dagaare [Dagara, Dagari] | mimir / mimie | tour / tubl | nyoboɣr / nyobogɛ | nyim / nyimɛ | zel / zelɛ | nwor / nɛ̃ | zĩ | kobr / kobɛ | tiɛ / tir | kõwõ/kwõõ | di | yur / ye |
| Proto-Eastern Oti–Volta | *nuan- | *tuo- | *wuan- | *nin- | *dian- | *nua- | *yia- | *kuan- | *tie- | *nia- | *di- | *yi- |
| Bariba | nɔnu, nɔni | so ~ soa, -su | wɛ̃ru | dondu | yara, -nu | nɔɔ (pl.?) | yem | kukuru | dã̀ã̀ (pl.?) | nim | tēm̄ | yísìrū |
| Natioro (Timba) | ɲǎːpéjá | ɲàŋwà | mṹnṹpwã́ | ɲĩ́nã́ŋɟɛ̄ | nɛ̃́mɛ̃́sáː | pɛ́lːɛ̄ | sjã́ːmĩ́ | kàːkwà | súmwà | lwā | àʔɔ́lɪ̄ | ɲĩ́nã́ |
| Natioro (Niansogoni) | ɲĩ́kúpjé | jɪ̀pã̌ | mṹnũ̀kũ̌ | ɲínːáː | lámːjáː | nã́ | tə́mǎ | nã́ŋkwáː | ʃjɛ̂ | nṹmṹː | ìwɔ́nːã́ | ínːã́ |
| Natioro (Faniagara) | ɲã́pʊ̀ːnã́ | ífwã̀nã́ | ʔṹnṹfã̀nã́ | ĩ́ndáːnã̀ | nĩ́ŋsáːnã̄ | nã́ːnã̀ | tímĩ́nĩ́ | kʊ́kánã̄ | síːkénã́ | nĩ́mĩ́nĩ̀ | ɛ̀wòlòjɛ́ | ínã́ːnã̄ |
| Moyobe | mɛnɪ́bɛ̀ / ɪ̀nɪ́bɛ̀ | kùtù / àtù | tíŋwáyí / áŋwáyí | tìní, kùní / aní | tìlénbí / àlénbí | ńnɔ́ɔ̀ / ínɔ́ɔ̀ | ményɛ́ / ányɛ́ | kúkɔ́hɔ́ / ákɔ́hɔ́ | kùléé / àléé | mɪ́nɪ̀ | li / lè | tìnyírì / ànyírì |
| Kulango (Bouna) | piege / piewu | tengu / tenu | saŋa / sãum | kaɣangbo / kaɣam | delengbo / delemu | nɔɔɣɔ / nuom | tuɔm | zukukpo / zukum | diɛkɔ / diɛnu | yɔkɔ | dɪ | yukɔ / yum |
| Tiefo | éjú | ēnɑ̃́tō | ēmɛ́ʔɛ́ | kɔ̃́ʔɔ̃́ | mʲɔ̃̄ | ēnwɔ̃́ʔɔ̃́ | ɟɑ̄lɑ̄, tɾɔ̃̄ | kɑ̄ūʔù | ʃɪ̃́ʔɪ́ | | | éjɛ́ |
| Viemo (Diosso) | gĩ́ːɾɔ̀ | cũ̄ljɔ̀ | mūmúɾō | kɑ̃́ːdɔ̄ | lɑ̃́ːtīɾɔ̄ | ŋɑ̃́ | kjíːmō | fūfūɾɔ́ | sóbò | númōɔ | nũ̄ɔ̃ | índō |
| Viemo (Soumaguina) | ɟĩ́ɾɔ̄ | tuĩ́jɔ̄ | mūmṹɾɔ̄ | kɑ̃̄ːnɔ̄ | lɑ̃́tīɾɔ̄ | ɲɑ̄ | tíɛ̄mɔ̄ | fúfūɾɔ̄ | sóbɔ̀ | númɔ̄ | jṹnũ̄ɔ̃̄kɛ̀ | ĩ́dɔ̄ |
| Samo, Maka (Toma) | jǐ | to | ɲɛ̃ | sɔ | lɛwɔ | lɛ | mɑ̀ | wɛ | mú | dɑ | ɑ̀mɑ́mbíː | |
| Samo, Matya (Kouy) | jɛrːɛ | toro | jiːni | sɔ̃ːnɛ | nɛnɛ | lɛ | mɪjɑ̀ | jɛrɛ | mú | dɑ́ | ɑnebɑ́rè | |
| Samo, Maya (Bounou) | ɲoːnì; jɛrɛ | toro | ɲinijɛrɛ | so | leːnè | lɛ | mɑ̌ | jɑre | mu | dɑ | ɑfɑ́bjèrè | |
| Téén | hinbiye / hinbu | tenike / tenu | mɪtɪyaka / mɪtɪyɔ | kamaka / kaamʊ | delenge / delemu | nʊfɪya / nʊfɪyɔ | tɔbɔ (pl) | kpoloko / kpolowo | dɪyaa / dɪwɔ | ɔkɔ / ɔwɔ | dɪ | yɪraa / yɪrɔ |
| Toussian, South [Win] | nyi / nyɛ | nigi / ni | mene / menenã | nyin / nyinɛ | nampar / namparnã | ṽiãʔ-lɛ / ṽiɛ-nɛ̃ | tõ | kəgbeke / kəgbal | sesuo-lɛ / sesar-lɛ | nĩ | nyõ | nyin |
| Toussian, North (Guéna-Kourinion) | nyi / nyɔ | ni/nãn / ninã/nœnnã | mle / mlənã | nyen / nyennã | nenpüœra | via/ṽiã / wẽy | tiõ/tõ | kəble / kəblenâ | sepwel / sepyi | | | |
| Siamou [Sɛmɛ] | nya/nyábí/nyábi | tà-syẽ̀ / tàsyẽ̀ | már | nyèn / nyěn | dɛ / dɛ́ | kõ̀ / kẽ | tṍ | kpár / kpar | timõ / timẽ | nũ | di | ỹi |
| Mambar | nyíí / nyíî | nyuweŋ / nyuwɛyɛ | munna / munnaʔa | gã / gãʔa | nyire / nyiree | nyu / nyüyi | ʃiʃi | katyiɣe / katyiye | ʃiɣe / ʃire | loeʔoe | di | mbaɣe / mbɛyɛ |
| Senar (Kankalaba) | nyini / nyinyẽy | nupaɣa / nupay | funan / funãge | gẽ/gan / gãgẽ | nyini / nyirke | nyuɣu / nyuy | sisyẽkɛ | kayige / katyiye | tiɣe / tĩyi/tĩr | Dogo | di | mɛɣɛ |
| Tenyer | yɛde/yade / yɛgyɛ/yagyɛ | dyigi / dyii | mənɛ / məligɛ | nkan / nhagal | nyinkan / nyẽhegal | nye / nyey | tuno | kyilige / kyileri | katyigi / katyir | lɔgɔ | di | migɛ / mii |

=== Numerals ===
Comparison of numerals in individual languages:

| Classification | Language | 1 | 2 | 3 | 4 | 5 | 6 | 7 | 8 | 9 | 10 |
|---|---|---|---|---|---|---|---|---|---|---|---|
| Bariba | Baatonum (1) | tía | ìru | ìta | ǹnɛ | nɔɔbù | nɔɔbù ka tía > nɔɔbatía (ka = and) | nɔɔbù ka ìru > nɔɔbaìru | nɔɔbù ka ìta > nɔɔbaìta | nɔɔbù ka ǹnɛ > nɔɔbaǹnɛ | ɔkuru |
| Bariba | Baatonum (2) | tiā | yìru | ìta / yìta | ǹnɛ | nɔ̀ɔbù | nɔ̀ɔbâ tiā (5 + 1) | nɔ̀ɔbá yìru (5 + 2) | nɔ̀ɔbâ yìta (5 + 3) | nɔ̀ɔbâ ǹnɛ (5 + 4) | wɔkuru |
| Central Gur, Northern, Bwamu | Buamu | dòũ̀ | ɲuː | tĩː | náː | hònú | hèzĩ̀ː (5 + 1) | hèɲuː (5 + 2) | hètĩː (5 + 3) | dènú | pílú |
| Central Gur, Northern, Bwamu | Cwi Bwamu | dòòn | ńɲūūn | ńɔlĩ̄īn | ńnáā | hòó | hòódwĩ̀ (5 + 1) | hòòɲū (5 + 2) | hɔ̀ɔ̀ˀlĩ̄ (5 + 3) | dĩ̀í́ | ˀɓúrúù |
| Central Gur, Northern, Bwamu | Láá Láá Bwamu | dò | ńɲɔ | ńtĩ | ńnɛ́ | hùanú | hùezĩn (5 + 1) | hòoɲu (5 + 2) | hɔ̀ɔtĩ (5 + 3) | dĩ̀iní | píru |
| Central Gur, Northern, Kurumfe | Koromfé | -ndom / ɡadɔm | ɪhĩĩ | ɪtãã | ɪnãã | ɪnɔm | ɪhʊrʊ | ɪpɛ̃ɛ̃ | ɪtɔɔ | ɪfa | fi |
| Central Gur, Northern, Oti-Volta, Buli-Koma | Buli | -yéŋ / wà-ɲī | bà-yɛ̀ | bà-tà | bà-nààsì | bà-nù | bà-yùèbì | bà-yòpɔ̄āī | nāāniŋ | nèūk | pī |
| Central Gur, Northern, Oti-Volta, Buli-Koma | Konni | kààní | àbɛ́lí / àlî | àbátá / àtâ | àbánìsà / ànísà | àbánʊ̀ / ànʊ́ | ńyúóbìŋ | m̀pṍĩ̀ | ǹníŋ̀ / àníì | ŋ̀wɛ́ | m̀bâŋ |
| Central Gur, Northern, Oti-Volta, Eastern | Biali | cə̄rə̄- / cə̄rə̄má (counting) | dyā | tāārī / tāārə̄ | nààsī / nààrə̄ | nùm | hã̀dwàm | pèléī | nēī | wáī | pwíɡə̄ |
| Central Gur, Northern, Oti-Volta, Eastern | Ditammari (1) | -béé, dèǹnì (counting) | -dyá, dɛ́ɛ́, diání | -tããtī | -nàà | -nùmmù | -kūà | -yīēkà | -nì | -wɛ̄ | [tā]píítà |
| Central Gur, Northern, Oti-Volta, Eastern | Ditammari (2) | denni | dɛɛni | tâati / tâadi | náà | numu | kuɔ | nyiekɛ | nni | nwɛi | tɛpiitɛ |
| Central Gur, Northern, Oti-Volta, Eastern | Mbelime | yɛ̃nde | yēdē | tāātē | naasi | nummu | dūo | doodɛ̄ | ninyɛ̃̄ | wɛ̄ī | kɛ̄ piíkɛ |
| Central Gur, Northern, Oti-Volta, Eastern | Waama | yòn | yɛ́ndí | táárí | náásì | nùn | k͡pàrùn | bérén | nɛ̃̀í | wɛ̃̀í | pííkà |
| Central Gur, Northern, Oti-Volta, Gurma | Gurma | yèndó | -lié | -tà | -nà | -mù | -luòbà | -lèlé | -nìː | -yìa | píìɡà |
| Central Gur, Northern, Oti-Volta, Gurma | Konkomba | -bàa | -lèe | -tàa | -nāa | -nmúu | -lúub | -lílé | -niín | -wɛ́ɛ | píìk |
| Central Gur, Northern, Oti-Volta, Gurma | Mɛyɔ́pɛ (Sola) | nni (-sɛ) | -tɛ́ | tɑɑni (-tɑɑni) | nnɑ (-nɑ) | nnupũ (-nupũ) | kouulṹ (-kpuulũ) | sɛ́ɛ́i (-sɛɛi) | kɛpɑhɑ (-pɑhɑ), mɛtɛ́ ɑ́mɛ we kɛfi | kɛlɛɛ́, mɛsɛ ɑ́mɛ we kɛfi | kɛfi |
| Central Gur, Northern, Oti-Volta, Gurma | Nateni (1) | -cɔ̃̄, dèn, dènà (counting) | -dɛ́ɛ́, dɛ́ń | tã̄lī, tã̄di | nàhĩ̀ | nùm̀ | kɔ̄lì, kɔ̀dì | yēhì | nīì | wɔ́ì | pítā |
| Central Gur, Northern, Oti-Volta, Gurma | Nateni (2) | màcɔ̃́ | dɛ́ɛ́ | tãdi | nàhì | nùm̀ | kɔ̀dì | yehì | niì | wɔ́ì | píta |
| Central Gur, Northern, Oti-Volta, Gurma | Ngangam (1) | mikpìɛkm | milíém | ńta | ńnàn | ńŋùn | ńlùòb | ǹlòlé | ǹnìín | ǹwɛ | píík |
| Central Gur, Northern, Oti-Volta, Gurma | Ngangam (2) | miba | mile | mita | minan | miŋun | miluob | milole | miniin | miwɛ | piik |
| Central Gur, Northern, Oti-Volta, Gurma, Moba | Bimoba | yènn | -lè | -tà | -ná | -ŋmú | -loòb | -lòlé | -niìn | -yià | |
| Central Gur, Northern, Oti-Volta, Gurma, Moba | Moba | jènǹ | ŋáńlé / ńlé | ŋáńtāː / ńtāː | ŋánnâ / nnâ | ŋáńmû / ńmû | ŋáńlɔ́ːb̀ / ńlɔ́ːb̀ | ŋáńlílé / ńlílé | ŋáńníːń / ńníːń | ŋáńwáī / ńwáī | píːɡ̀ |
| Central Gur, Northern, Oti-Volta, Gurma, Moba | Ntcham | ǹ.-bá /-bɔ́, m̀-báá (enumerative) | ǹ.-lí, ǹ-léé (enumerative) | ǹ.-ta, ǹtàà (enumerative) | ǹ.-nàà, ǹnàà (enumerative) | ǹ.-ŋmòò, ŋ̀-ŋmòò (enumerative) | ǹ.-lùù, ǹ-lùù (enumerative) | ǹ.-lùlí, ǹlùlí (enumerative) | ǹ.-nìì, ǹníí (enumerative) | ǹ.-wá / -wɔ, ŋ̀wáá (enumerative) | sààláá, sààláá (enumerative) |
| Central Gur, Northern, Oti-Volta, Gurma, Ntcham | Akaselem | m̀bá | mbìlé | ǹtà | ǹnàà | m̀ŋmɔ̀ | ǹlòòbè | ǹlòlé | ǹɲìì | ŋ̀wɛ̀ʔ | pʷíʔ |
| Central Gur, Northern, Oti-Volta, Western, Nootre | Notre | yómbó | njéntà | ntáátí | nnáásí | nnú | nyúapè | npwɛ̀ | nnii | nwà / ŋwà | píá |
| Central Gur, Northern, Oti-Volta, Western, Northwest | Farefare | yénnó | yì | tã́ | n náásí | n núú | n yòòbí | n yòpɔ́í | n níí | n wɛ́í | píá |
| Central Gur, Northern, Oti-Volta, Western, Northwest | Mòoré | yé/yémbre | yì /yìibú | tã̀ /tã́abo | náase | nú | yòobé | yòpoé | níi | wɛ́ | píiɡa |
| Central Gur, Northern, Oti-Volta, Western, Northwest | Safaliba | àyàʔ | àyîʔ | àtâʔ | ànáásí | ànúú | àyòòbí | àyòpõ̀ĩ̂ | ànɪ́ɪ̀ | àwã̀ĩ̂ | pẽ́ẽ́, pĩ́ẽ́ |
| Central Gur, Northern, Oti-Volta, Western, Northwest | Wali | bʊ́ŋjɪ̀ŋ ('one thing') / jíntì ('one) | ájì ('two thing') / jéé | átà / tàà | ánááhì / nááhɪ̀ | ánú / nùù | ájʊ̀ɔ̀biɛ́ / jʊ̀ɔ̀bɛ́ | ájúpúì / jʊ̀púi | ánì / nìì | áwɛ́ɪ́ / wáì | píé / píé |
| Central Gur, Northern, Oti-Volta, Western, Northwest, Dagaari-Birifor, Birifor | Malba Birifor | bõ-ƴén (bomƴén) | áyi | ata | ánãan | ãnũun | ayʊɔb | ánũu-nɪ-áyi (5 + 2) | ánũu-nɪ-ata (5 + 3) | pié for bir | pié |
| Central Gur, Northern, Oti-Volta, Western, Northwest, Dagaari-Birifor, Birifor | Southern Birifor | boyæn | ayi | ata | anaar | anuu | ayʊɔb | ayopoin | aniin | pie for bir | pie |
| Central Gur, Northern, Oti-Volta, Western, Northwest, Dagaari-Birifor, Dagaari | Northern Dagaara | bõ-yen / bõe (thing-one) | ayi | ata | anaar | anũu | ayʊɔb | ayɔpõe (six-one) | anĩi | awaɪ / pi-waɪ | pie |
| Central Gur, Northern, Oti-Volta, Western, Northwest, Dagaari-Birifor, Dagaari | Southern Dagaare | bòn yéní / yenti | -yé / ye | -tà / ta | -nádɪ / nadɪ | -nù / nu | -yʊ̀ɔ́ / -yʊ̀ɔ́bʊ́ / yʊɔ | -yʊ̀ɔ́pɔ̃́ɔ̃́ / pɔ̃ĩ | -nìì / nii | -wáì / waɪ | píé |
| Central Gur, Northern, Oti-Volta, Western, Southeast | Dagbani (Dagomba) | ndààm, yín-ó, yín-í | -yí | -tá | -náhí | -nú | -yóbù | -yòpóìn | -níì | -wéy | píá |
| Central Gur, Northern, Oti-Volta, Western, Southeast | Hanga | -yɪnnɪ / lʊ̀ŋ̀kʷɔ́ | ʌ́yíʔ | ʌ́tʰʌ́ʔ | ʌ́nʌ́ːsɪ | ʌ́nʊ́ | ʌ́yóːbʊ̀ | ʌ́yʌ́pʷòⁱ | ʌ́níː | ʌ́wáⁱ | pʰíːʌ́ |
| Central Gur, Northern, Oti-Volta, Western, Southeast | Kamara | yínè | áyi | áta | ánâsɛ | ánú | áyɔ̀wí | áyɔ̀poi | ánnî | awàɛ | píyá |
| Central Gur, Northern, Oti-Volta, Western, Southeast | Kantosi | yéní | a-yí | a-tá | a-násí | a-nú | a-yóbù | a-yàpóì | a-níì | a-wài | píá |
| Central Gur, Northern, Oti-Volta, Western, Southeast | Kusaal | àɾàkṍʔ / àdàkṍʔ | àjí | àtá | ànáasíʔ | ànú | àjɔ̀ɔbíʔ / àjɔ̀ɔbʊ́ʔ | àjɔ́póéʔ | áníi | àwáíʔ | píi |
| Central Gur, Northern, Oti-Volta, Western, Southeast | Mampruli | yɪ́nní / ndààm (in counting) | a-yí | a-tá | a-náásí | a-nú | a-yóóbù | a-yòpɔ̃́ì / -yòpwè | a-níì | a-wã̀y | pííyá |
| Central Gur, Northern, Oti-Volta, Yom-Nawdm | Nawdm | m̩̀hén | m̩̀ɾéʔ | m̩̀tâʔ | m̩̀náː | m̩̀nû | m̩̀ɾòːndí | m̩̀lèbléʔ | m̩̀nìːndí | m̩̀wɛ́ʔ | kwíʔɾí |
| Central Gur, Northern, Oti-Volta, Yom-Nawdm | Yom (Pila) | nyə̌ŋ- / nyə̌rɣə- | -li | -ta | -nɛ̀ɛ̀sə̀ | -nù | -lèèwə̀r | -nùɣa -li ('five and two', ɣa > 'and') | -li k͡pa fɛɣa (' two are not in ten ') | nyə̌ŋ- /nyə̌rɣə- k͡pa fɛɣa | fɛɣa |
| Central Gur, Southern, Dyan | Dyan (1) | bɛ̃̀ɡ / bɪ̀ɛlè | yèɲɔ̃̀ | yèthɛ̃̀sì | yènàa | dìemà | mɔ̀lɔ̀dũ̀ (5 + 1) | mɔ̀lɔ̀ɲɔ̃̀ (5 + 2) | mɔ̀lɔ̀thɛ̃̀sì (5 + 3) | nĩ́kpó-cí-bèrè (10 - 1) ? | nĩ́kpó |
| Central Gur, Southern, Dyan | Dyan (2) | bɛ̃ɡ / bɪɛle | yenyɔ̃ | yethɛ̃si | yenaa | diema | mɔlɔdũ (5 + 1) | mɔlɔnyɔ̃ (5 + 2) | mɔlɔthɛ̃si (5 + 3) | nĩkpo-ci-bere (10 - 1) ? | nĩkpo |
| Central Gur, Southern, Gan-Dogose | Dogosé | tìkpóʔ | ìyɔ̰́ʔ | ìsá̰a̰ʔ | ìyḭ̀i̬ʔ | ìwà̰aʔ | mà̰ nḭ̀ póʔ (5 + 1) | mà̰ nḭ̀ yɔ̰́ʔ (5 + 2) | mà̰ nḭ̀ sá̰a̰ʔ (5 + 3) | mà̰ nḭ̀ yḭ̀i̬ʔ(5 + 4) | ɡbùnè |
| Central Gur, Southern, Gan-Dogose | Kaansá (Kaansé) | tʰik̩͡po | ɛɲɔ̰ | isãa | ɛɲee | ɛmwãa | maʔnik͡po (5 + 1) | maʔniyɔ̃ (5 + 2) | maʔnisãaʔ (5 + 3) | k͡ponko (10 - 1) ? | k͡pooɡo |
| Central Gur, Southern, Gan-Dogose | Khisa (Komono) | ílèŋ | ád͡ʒɔ̃̀ŋ | átʰɔ̀ʔ | ádàa | ánɔ̃̀n | nɔ̀k͡pòŋ (5 + 1) | nɔ̀́d͡ʒɔ̃̀ŋ (5 + 2) | nɔ́tʰɔ́ʔ (5 + 3) | nɔ̀dáa (5 + 4) | hʊ̀ k͡pélé / sínʊ̃y |
| Central Gur, Southern, Grusi | Kassem (1) | kàlʊ̀ | ǹlè | ǹtɔ̀ | ǹnā | ǹnū | ǹdʊ̀n | ǹpɛ̀ | nānā | nʊ̀ɡʊ̄ | fúɡə́ |
| Central Gur, Southern, Grusi | Kasem (2) | kàlʊ̀ | ǹlè | ǹtɔ̀ | ǹnā | ǹnū | ǹdʊ̀n | m̀pɛ̀ | nānā | nʊ̀ɡʊ̄ | fúɡə́ |
| Central Gur, Southern, Grusi | Kasem (3) | kàlʊ/ dìdʊǎ | ǹlè / ǹlèi | ǹtɔ̀ | ǹnā | ǹnū | ǹdʊ̃̀ | m̀pɛ̀ / m̀pwɛ̀ | nānā | nʊ̌ɡʊ /nǒɡo | fúɡə |
| Central Gur, Southern, Grusi | Lyélé | èdù | sə̀lyè | sə̀tə̀ | sə̀na | sə̀nu | ʃə̀ldù (5 + 1) ? | ʃàlpyɛ̀ (5 + 2) ? | lyɛlɛ | nə̀bɔ́ | ʃíyə́ |
| Central Gur, Southern, Grusi | Northern Nuni | ùdù | bìlə̀ | bìtwàà | bìna | bìnu | badù | bàpà | lɛlɛ | nìbu | fíɡə́ |
| Central Gur, Southern, Grusi | Southern Nuni | nə̀dʊ̀ | bə̀lə̀ | bàtwà | bànīān | bònū | bàrdʊ̀ | bàrpɛ̀ | nānā | nʊ̀ɡʊ́ | fúɡə́ |
| Central Gur, Southern, Grusi | Pana | ténɡí | ɲìí | cɔ́ɔ̀ | nàasí | nṍn | nõ̀mpí | nõ̀ncó | bàndá | ɟèefó | fó |
| Central Gur, Southern, Grusi, Eastern | Bago-Kusuntu | ŋʊrʊk͡pák͡pá | bààlɛ̀ | bàtòòro | bànásá | bàànʊ́ | lèèjò | lʊ̀ŋlè | ɖìk͡pèèrè | kàkààrè /ŋʊrʊk͡pák͡pá tá sàlá (10 -1) | sàlá |
| Central Gur, Southern, Grusi, Eastern | Bogoŋ (Cala / Chala) | -re-, rʊ, -dʊ́ndʊlʊŋ | -la | -tooro | -náárá | -nʊ́ŋ | lʊʊrʊ | lɪkaarɛ | jiŋináárá (4 + 4) ? | saŋɡʊ́ | ɡifí |
| Central Gur, Southern, Grusi, Eastern | Delo | daale | ala | atooro | anaara | anoŋ | looro | nyetooro (10 - 3) ? | ɡyanaara (2 x 4) ? | kadaale (10 - 1) ? | kufu |
| Central Gur, Southern, Grusi, Eastern | Kabiyé | kʊ́yʊ́m | nàálɛ̀ | nàádozó | nàã́zá | kàɡ͡bã́nzì | loɖò | lʊ̀bɛ̀ | lùtoozo | nakʊ̀ | híu / náánʊ́wá |
| Central Gur, Southern, Grusi, Eastern | Lama (Lamba) | kóɖə́m | násə̂l | nàsìsɨ̀ | násə́násá | násə́ná | lə̀ɖə̀ | naosanautɨsɨ (4 + 3) | násə́nnásá (4 + 4) | nàkò | hʲú |
| Central Gur, Southern, Grusi, Eastern | Lukpa | kʊ̀lʊ̀m | naalɛ̀ | tòòsó | naasá | kàk͡pásɪ̀ | náátòsò (2 x 3 ??) | náátòsò m̀pɔ̀ɣɔ̀laɣá (6 + 1) | pə́lé fɛ́jɪ́ (- 2) | pɔ̀ɣɔ̀láɣáfɛ́jɪ́́ (- 1) | náánʊ́á |
| Central Gur, Southern, Grusi, Eastern | Tem (1) | káɔ́ɖe | sííɛ̀ | tóózo | nááza | nʊ́ʊ́wa | loɖo | lʊbɛ | lutoozo | kéénííré | fuú |
| Central Gur, Southern, Grusi, Eastern | Tem (2) | káɔ́ɖe | sííɛ̀ | tóózó | náázá | nʊ́ʊ́wa | loɖo | lʊbɛ | lutoozo | kéénííré | fuú |
| Central Gur, Southern, Grusi, Western | Chakali | dɪ́ɡɪ́máná / dɪ́ɡɪ́máŋá | álìɛ̀ | átʊ̀rʊ̀ / átʊ̀lì / á-tòrò | ànáásì | āɲɔ̃̄ | állʊ̀rʊ̀ / állʊ̀lʊ̀ | àlʊpɛ̀ / lʊ́pɛ̀ | ŋmɛ́ŋtɛ́l | dɪ́ɡɪ́tūū (10 - 1) ? | fí |
| Central Gur, Southern, Grusi, Western | Deg (Degha) | beŋk͡paŋ / k͡pee (for counting only) | anɛ / nɛɛ | adoro / tooro | anaarɛ / naarɛ | anue / nue | anʊmɛl / nʊmɛl (5 + 1) | anʊanɛ / nʊanɛ (5 + 2) | anʊatoro / nʊatoto (5 + 3) | anʊanaarɛ / nʊanaarɛ (5 + 4) | fi |
| Central Gur, Southern, Grusi, Western | Paasaal (Passale) | kɪ́dɪ́ɡɪ́ / dííŋ | bàlìyà / lìyà | bòtò / tóó | bànāā / náá | bɔ̀nɔ̀ŋ / nɔ́ɔ́ŋ | bàdʊ̀ / dʊ́ʊ́ | bàpɛ̀ / pɛ́ɛ́ | kyórí / kyórí | níbí / níbí | fí / fí |
| Central Gur, Southern, Grusi, Western | Phuie (Puguli) | déò / dùdúmí | ʔɛ̃́ɛ̃́ | ʔárʊ̀ | ànɛ̃́ / ànɛ́ŋ ? | ànɔ̃́ / ànɔ́ŋ ? | ànṍ déò (5 + 1) | ànṍ ʔɛ̃́ɛ̃́ (5 + 2) | ànɔ̃́ ʔárʊ̀ (5 + 3) | ànóŋ ànɛ̃́ / fí dùdúmí tʰõ̀ | fí |
| Central Gur, Southern, Grusi, Western | Western Sisaala | bàlá / dɪ̀ɛ́n | bɛ́llɛ́ / lɛ́ | bàtòró / tòró | bànáá / náá | bɔ̀mmʊ̀ɔ́ / mʊ̀ɔ́ | bóldó / dó | bálpɛ́ / pɛ́ | tʃòrí | nɛ̀mɛ́ | fíí |
| Central Gur, Southern, Grusi, Western | Sisaala Tumulung | kʊ̀bàlá / dɪ̀áŋ | bàlɪ̀á / lɪ̀a | bàtórí / tórí | bànɛ́sɛ́ / nɛ̀sɛ́ | bànɔ́ŋ / nɔ́ŋ | bàlídú / dú | bàlɪ̀pɛ́ / pɛ́ | tʃòrí | nìbí | fíí |
| Central Gur, Southern, Grusi, Western | Sissala | balá | bɛllɛ | botoro | baná | bɔmmʊ́ɔ́ | balɡo | balpɛ | córí | nɛ́mɛ́ | fí |
| Central Gur, Southern, Grusi, Western | Tampulma | diiɡɛ | alɛɛwa | atoora | anaasi | anyuún | anɔɔrà | anɔpɛ | ŋmɛnaasa | diɡtó | fí |
| Central Gur, Southern, Grusi, Western | Vagla | k͡páŋ / k͡péé (when counting) | ànɛ̀ɛ̀ | àhòrò | ànáázʊ̀ | ànúè | ànʊ́mbɛl (bɛl a certain one ) | àníídàànɛ̀ɛ̀ | ámàntánnààzí / ŋmàntánnààzí | kábɛl (ka to remain ) | fí |
| Central Gur, Southern, Grusi, Western | Winyé (Kõ) | ndo | nyɪ̃ɛ | ntɔɔ | nná | nwɔ̃́ | nɡo | npiɛ | npɔɔ | nlɛbɪ | fʊ̃́ |
| Central Gur, Southern, Kirma-Tyurama | Cerma (Kirma) | ǹdéiŋ | ǹhã́ĩ | ǹsíɛi | ǹnáà | ǹdîì | níedìeí (5 + 1) | níehã́ĩ (5 + 2) | níisìɛí (5 + 3) | nénnáà (5 + 4) | cĩ́ŋcíelùó |
| Central Gur, Southern, Kirma-Tyurama | Turka | dẽẽná | hãl | siɛl | n̩nə̃̀ | n̩di | nã́ndèin (5 + 1) | nə̃́rə̃́hã̀l (5 + 2) | nə̃́rə̃́siɛ̀l (5 + 3) | dɛ̃̀ɛ̃̀sə́ (10 -1) ? | nṹɔ̃́sɔ̃̀ |
| Kulango | Kulango (1) | ta | bíla | sããbe | na | tɔ | tʊrɔtãtã (5 + 1) | tʊrɔfriɲuu (5 + 2) | tʊrɔfrisãã (5 + 3) | tʊrɔfrina (5 + 4) | nuun |
| Kulango | Kulango (2) | táà | bílà | sã̀ã̀bí | nã́ | tɔ́ | tɔ́rɔ́tàà (5 + 1) | tɔ́rɔ́fíríɲũ̀ (5 + 2) | tɔ́rɔ́fírísã̀ã̀ (5 + 3) | tɔ́rɔ́fírínã́ (5 + 4) | nṹnũ̀ |
| Kulango | Bouna Kulango | taà, tãã̀ | bɪlà, nyʊʊ̀ | sãã̀ | naʔ | tɔ | tɔ̀rɔ̀ fɪn taà, tɔrɔ fɪ(rɪ) nyʊʊ̀ (5 + 1) | tɔ̀rɔ̀ fɪn bɪla (5 + 2) | tɔ̀rɔ̀ fɪn sãã̀ (5 + 3) | tɔ̀rɔ̀ fɪn na (5 + 4) | nuùnu, nûnu, tɔtɔ bɪla, tɔtɔ nyʊʊ̀ |
| Lobi | Lobi | bìɛ̀l | yɛnyɔ | yentʰer | yɛnã́ | yɛmɔɪ | màadõ | makonyɔ (5 + 2) | makõtʰer (5 + 3) | nyʊ̌ɔr bìr pʰéro (10 - 1) | nyʊ̌ɔr |
| Senufo, Karaboro | Eastern Karaboro (1) | nɔ̀ni | ʃyɔ̃̀ / ʃiɲ̀ | tã̀ã̀ | tíʃyàr /díʃyàr /ríʃyàr | bwà / bwɔ̀ | kwaɲ̀ | kwa-sĩ̀ĩ̀ (lit: "a second six") | kwa-tã̀ã̀ (lit: " a third six") | kwa-ríʃyàr (lit: "fourth six") | sĩʃye |
| Senufo, Karaboro | Eastern Karaboro (2) | nɔ̀nī | syã̀ŋ | tã̀ã | tésyàr / résyàr | bwà | kwāy | kwásĩ̀ĩ | kwátã̀à | kwàrésyàr | sẽ̄nsyē |
| Senufo, Karaboro | Western Karaboro | nɔ̀ni | ʃin | taàr | tɪhyɛɛ̀r | bwɔ̀ | k(ʋ)lɔ̀n | klɔʃìn | kwɔtàar̀ | wɔ̀dèfèr / wɔ̀def(ə)r ? | síncíl |
| Senufo, Kpalaga | Palaka Senoufo | niŋɡ͡be | sɔinŋ | taanri = tããri ? | jijilɛi = d͡ʒid͡ʒilɛi ? | kanɡuruɡo | kuɡɔlɔŋ | kuɡɔlɔŋ sɔinŋ (5 + 2) | kuɡɔlɔŋ taanri (5 + 3) | kuɡɔlɔŋ d͡ʒid͡ʒilɛi (5 + 4) | kɔ́jɛ |
| Senufo, Nafaanra | Nafaanra Senoufo | núnu | çíín | táárɛ̀ | ɟíɟírɛ̀ | kúnɔ | kɔ́ɔ̀nánù (5 + 1) | kɔ́ɔ̀náçíín (5 + 2) | kɔ́ɔ̀nátárè (5 + 3) | kɔ́ɔ̀náɟirɛ (5 + 4) | kɛ́ |
| Senufo, Senari | Cebaara Senoufo | nìbín | sīin | tāanri | sīcɛ̄rɛ̄ | kāɡūnɔ̀ | kɔ̀rɔ́nī (5 + 1) | kɔ̀rɔ́sīin (5 + 2) | kɔ̀rɔ́tāanrì (5 + 3) | k͡pǎjɛ̄rɛ̄ (5 + 4) | kɛ́ɛ |
| Senufo, Suppire-Mamara | Mamara Senoufo (Minyanka) | niɡĩ̀ / niɡĩ (second set from SIL) | ʃɔ̃̀ɔ̃̀ / ʃũ̀ũ̀ | tããrè / tããri | ʃiʃyɛ̀ɛrɛ̀ / ʃiʃɛɛrɛ | kaɡuru / kaɡuro | ɡ͡baara / ɡ͡baara | ɡ͡baa-ʃɔ̃̀ɔ̃̀ / ɡ͡baaraʃũũ (5 + 2) | ʃɔ̃̀ɔ̃̀lake / ʃũ̀ũ̀lakɛ (2 to 10) | niɡĩ̀fɔ̀kɛ / niɡĩlakɛ (1 to 10) | kɛ / kɛ |
| Senufo, Suppire-Mamara | Shempire Senoufo (1) | ninɡin | ʃuunni | taanri | sicɛɛrɛ | kaɡuru | ɡ͡baani | ɡ͡baʃuuni (5 + 2) | ɡ͡bataanri (5 + 3) | ɡ͡baɛɛrɛ (5 + 4) | kɛ |
| Senufo, Suppire-Mamara | Shempire Senoufo (2) | nanbin | ʃuunni | taanri | sicɛɛrɛ | kaɡro | ɡ͡baani | ɡ͡baʃuuni (5 + 2) | ɡ͡bataanri (5 + 3) | ɡ͡baɛɛrɛ (5 + 4) | kɛ |
| Senufo, Suppire-Mamara | Sìcìté Senoufo | nìkĩ̀ | sɔ̃̀ɔ̃̀nì / sũ̀ũ̀nì | tã̀ã̀rì | sìcɛ̀ɛ̀rì | kānkūrò | ɡ͡bāārù | ɡ͡bārsɔ̃̀ɔ̃̀nì | ɡ͡bārtã̀ã̀rì / kāzɛ̄ɛm̀bē | ɡ͡bārsìcɛ̀ɛ̀rì / nìkĩ̀ndáʔá (10 - 1) | kɛ̄ |
| Senufo, Suppire-Mamara | Supyire Senoufo | nìŋkìn | ʃùùnnì | tàànrè | sìcyɛ̀ɛ̀rè | kaŋkuro (< 'fist ') | baa-nì (5 + 1) | baa-ʃùùnnì (5 + 2) | baa-tàànrè (5 + 3) | baa-sìcyɛ̀ɛ̀rè (5 + 4) | kɛ̄ |
| Senufo, Tagwana-Djimini | Djimini Senoufo | nuŋɡ͡ba | ʃyɛn | tããri | tid͡ʒɛrɛ | kaŋɡuruɡo | kɔɡɔlɔni | kɔlɔʃyɛn (5 + 2) | kɔlɔtããri (5 + 3) | kɔlɔd͡ʒɛrɛ (5 + 4) | kɛ |
| Senufo, Tagwana-Djimini | Nyarafolo Senoufo | nīɡbe | sīin | tāanri | sīcɛri | kōɡunɔ̀ | kɔ̀línī (5 + 1) | kɔ̀lisīin (5 + 2) | kàtāanrì (5 + 3) | kàcɛ̄rì (5 + 4) | kíɛ̀ |
| Senufo, Tagwana-Djimini | Tagwana Senoufo | nuɡ͡be | syẽ | tãri | tityere | koɡunu | nõli | nasyẽ (5 + 2) | natãri (5 + 3) | natyere (5 + 4) | kẽ / k͡prò |
| Teen | Téén (Lorhon) | tanɪ | nyoor | saanr | na | tɔ | tɔtanɪ (lit: five one) | tɔnyoor (lit: five two) | tɔsaanr (lit: five three) | tanbalˈpɔrwɔ (lit: one less than ten) | ˈpɔrwɔ |
| Tiefo | Tiéfo (1) | ʔe diɛ̃ni (attributive use: dɛ̃̀) | ɟɔ̃ | sã́ | ʔuʔɔ̃́ / ŋɔɔ (variant of Noumoudara) | kã̀ | kã̀-dĩ (5 + 1) | kã-ɟɔ̃ (5 + 2) | kã-sá (5 + 3) | kã-ʔuɔ̃́ (5 + 4) | támúwá / kɛ̃ |
| Tiefo | Tiéfo (2) | dɛ̃̀ / ʔë diɛ̃̀ni | jɔ̃ | sã́ | ʔuʔɔ̃́ | kã̀ | kã̀-dĩ (5 + 1) | kã̀-jɔ̃ (5 + 2) | kã̀-sá (5 + 3) | kã̀-ʔuɔ̃ (5 + 4) | tamʷúá / támú |
| Tusia | Northern Toussian (1) | nāɣ, nāɣ, nāɣ | nīnì | tɔ̄nɔ̀ | jã᷇ | klò | kùnũ᷇ | kālèj | kɔ̀tɔ̃̂ | kàjã̂ | bwɔ̀ |
| Tusia | Northern Toussian (2) | nṍṍkə̀ | nĩ́ŋnõ̀ | tṍṍnõ̀ | ĩ́jã̂ | klʊ̂ | kv̀v̀nə̃̀ŋ (5 + 1) | kvììnĩ̀ (5 + 2) | k͡pwɛ̀ɛ̀tṍ (5 + 3) | k͡pààrĩ̀jã́ (5 + 4) | sàbwɔ̀ |
| Tusia | Southern Toussian | núkú | nínɔ́ | tɔ̃́nɔ́ | ńyã́h | kwlɔ | kénúkò (5 + 1) | kwǎrninɔ (5 + 2) | kwǎrtɔ̃́nɔ (5 + 3) | kwǎryã́h (5 + 4) | ɡbãm |
| Viemo | Viemo (Vigye) | dũde [dʷũⁿde] | niinĩ [niːnĩ] | sãsĩ [sãsĩ] | jumĩ [d͡ʒʷumĩ] | kuɛɡe [kwɛɣe] | kõnũrã [kõnũɾã] | kõnĩse [kõnĩse] | jumĩjɔ niinĩ [d͡ʒʷumĩd͡ʒɔ niːnĩ] 4 x 2 ? | kwɔmĩdĩ fɛrɛyɔ [k͡pʷɔmĩⁿdĩ fɛɾɛjɔ] -1? | kwɔmũ [k͡pʷɔmũ] |
| Wara-Natioro | Wara | púwò | bǒ | tĩ́ | náású | sùsú | sírìpò | súrũ̌tó / sínĩ̀tó | sĩ̂tĩ́ (+ 3?) | sĩ̂náású (+ 4 ?) | kã̀ã̀sá |

== Writing system ==
The Goulsse alphabet was invented in 2022 as a native script for the Gur languages.
