= Moba =

Moba may refer to:

- Moba, Democratic Republic of the Congo, a town
- Moba, Nigeria, a local government area
- Moba people, a Gur-speaking ethnic group from north-eastern Ghana and north-western Togo.
- Moba language

MOBA may refer to:

- Multiplayer online battle arena, a video game genre
- Museum of Bad Art, in Massachusetts
- Molybdenum cofactor guanylyltransferase, an enzyme
