= Bimoba =

Bimoba may be,

- Bimoba people
- Bimoba language
