= J =

Tenth letter of the Latin alphabet

- J j

Usage
- Writing system: Latin script
- Type: Alphabetic
- Language of origin: Latin language
- Sound values: [j]; [dʒ]; [tʃ]; [x~h]; [ʒ]; [ɟ]; [ʝ]; [dz]; [tɕ]; [gʱ]; [ts]; [dʑ]; [ʐ]; [ʃ]; [ɧ]; [c̬]; [ɕ]; [tj]; [t]; [i]; [ɘ]
- In Unicode: U+004A, U+006A, U+0237
- Alphabetical position: 10

History
Development
D36
          - Ιι
            - 𐌉
              - I i
                - J j
- Time period: 14th century to present
- Descendants: Ɉ; Tittle; J
- Sisters: І; Ј; י; ي; ܝ; ی; ࠉ; 𐎊; ዪ; Ⴢ; ⴢ; ჲ

Other
- Associated graphs: j(x), ij
- Writing direction: Left-to-right

J (minuscule: j) is the tenth letter of the Latin alphabet, used in the modern English alphabet, the alphabets of other Western European languages and others worldwide. Its usual name in English is jay (pronounced /ˈdʒeɪ/), with a now-uncommon variant jye /ˈdʒaɪ/.

Writing "J" in cursive

When used in the International Phonetic Alphabet for the voiced palatal approximant (the sound of "y" in "yes") it may be called yod or jod (pronounced /ˈjɒd/ or /ˈjoʊd/).

== History ==
Egyptian hieroglyph ꜥ	Phoenician Yodh	Western Greek Iota	Etruscan I	Latin I	Latin J
Egyptian Hieroglyph describing an arm				Latin I	Latin J

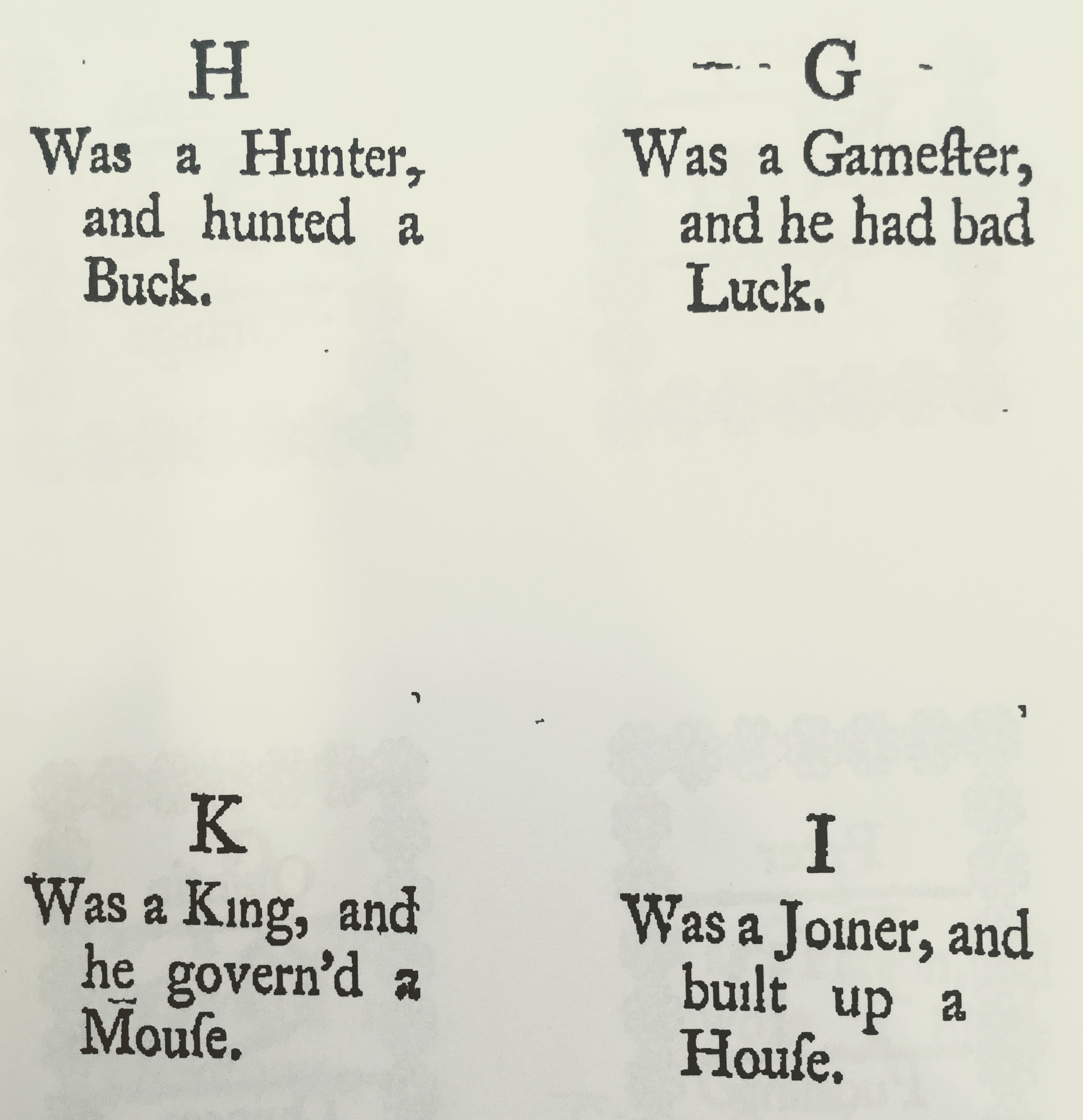
Children's book from 1743, showing I and J considered to be the same letter

The letter J used to be used as the swash glyph of the letter I. It was often used at the end of words and Roman numerals when following another I, as in XXIIJ or xxiij instead of XXIII or xxiii for the Roman numeral twenty-three. Both these letters (or variants of the same letter) equally represented /i/, /iː/, and /j/; however, Romance languages developed new sounds (from former /j/ and /ɡ/) that came to be represented as 'I' and 'J'; therefore, English J, acquired from the French J, has a sound value quite different from /j/ (which represents the initial sound in the English language word "yet"). Such a distinctive usage emerged in Middle High German.

Antonio de Nebrija (1444–1522) distinguished ⟨i⟩ and ⟨j⟩ as representing separate sounds in his Gramática de la lengua castellana published in 1492. In the font in which that grammar and Nebrija's Spanish-Latin dictionary (ca. 1495) were published, the lowercase letters ⟨i⟩ and ⟨j⟩ were clearly distinguished, but one and the same glyph was used for the uppercase letters.

Gian Giorgio Trissino (1478–1550) was the first to explicitly distinguish I and J in both uppercase and lowercase as representing separate sounds, in his Ɛpistola del Trissino de le lettere nuωvamente aggiunte ne la lingua italiana ("Trissino's epistle about the letters recently added in the Italian language") of 1524.

Pierre de la Ramée (also known as Petrus Ramus or Peter Ramus, 1515–1572) introduced the distinction into French and Latin. In the 17th century, it was adopted in English. However, even when the letters ⟨i⟩ and ⟨j⟩ were distinguished in print, they used to be often sorted in dictionaries as variants of one and the same letter (for example, jam, iambic, jangle); that practice was common in French dictionaries before 1762 and in English dictionaries before 1820.

== Use in writing systems ==
Pronunciation of ⟨j⟩ by language
Orthography	Phonemes	Notes
Afrikaans	/j/	
Albanian	/j/	
Arabic romanization	/dʒ/ or /ʒ/	
Azeri	/ʒ/	
Basque	/j/, /dʒ/, /χ/, /ʃ/, /ɟ/, /ʒ/	The letter ⟨j⟩ has a variety of realisations according to the regional dialect: [j, dʒ, χ, ʃ, ɟ, ʒ], as pronounced from west to east in south Bizkaia and coastal Lapurdi, central Bizkaia, east Bizkaia and Gipuzkoa, south Navarre, inland Lapurdi and Low Navarre, and Zuberoa, respectively.
Belarusian	/j/	
Cantonese (Yale)	/t͡s/	
Cantonese (Jyutping)	/j/	
Catalan	/ʒ/ or /dʒ/	Pronounced as a fricative /ʒ/ in Standard Catalan and affricate /dʒ/ in Standard Valencian. In some Catalan dialects /ʒ/ may alternate with an affricate in initial and post-consonantal position. In some dialects (including Standard Valencian) it is pronounced /j/ in terms like jo ('I') and ja ('already'). The Spanish ⟨j⟩ /x/ is found in loanwords like orujo ('grape liqueur') or La Rioja ('La Rioja').
Standard Chinese (Pinyin)	/tɕ/	
Standard Chinese (Wade–Giles)	/ʐ/	
Czech	/j/	
Danish	/j/	/ɕ/ and /tj/ in some loanwords, like jonglør and jazz.
Dutch	/j/	
English	/dʒ/	/j/, /ʒ/ and /h/ in some loanwords, like fjord, bijou, and junta respectively.
Esperanto	/j/ or /i̯/	
Estonian	/j/	
Filipino	/dʒ/, /h/	Used only in words of foreign origin that have not yet been assimilated into the language.
Finnish	/j/	
French	/ʒ/	/dʒ/ in some loanwords, like jazz
German	/j/	/dʒ/ and /ʒ/ in some loanwords, like Job and Jalousie respectively.
Greenlandic	/j/	
Hindi (Hunterian)	/dʒ/	
Hokkien (Pe̍h-ōe-jī, Tâi-lô)	/dz/ ~ /dʑ/, /z/ ~ /ʑ/	
Hungarian	/j/	
Icelandic	/j/	
Igbo	/dʒ/	
Indonesian	/dʒ/	/j/ in the pre-1972 spelling.
Irish	/dʒ/	Used only in relatively new loanwords, such as jab, júdó, and jíp; not officially part of the Irish alphabet. Typically represents [dʒ], a non-native phoneme (see Irish phonology) and is substituted with /ʃ/ in words like Seapáin /ˈʃapˠaːnʲ/.
Italian	/j/	Used only in loanwords and in some Italian proper names and not part of the alphabet.
Japanese (Hepburn)	/ʑ/ ~ /dʑ/	
Khmer (ALA-LC)	/c/	
Kiowa	/t/	
Konkani (Roman)	/ɟ/	
Korean (RR)	/ts/ ~ /tɕ/, /dz/ ~ /dʑ/	
Kurdish	/ʒ/	
Luxembourgish	/j/, /ʒ/	
Latvian	/j/	
Lithuanian	/j/	
Malay	/dʒ/	
Maltese	/j/	
Manx	/dʒ/	
Norwegian	/j/	
Oromo	/dʒ/	
Pashto romanization	/dʒ/	
Polish	/j/	
Portuguese	/ʒ/	
Romanian	/ʒ/	
Scots	/dʒ/	
Serbo-Croatian	/j/	
Shona	/dʒ/	
Slovak	/j/	
Slovenian	/j/	
Somali	/dʒ/	
Spanish	/x/ ~ /h/	
Swahili	/ɟ/	
Swedish	/j/	/ɧ/ in some loanwords, like jalusi.
Tamil romanization	/dʑ/	
Tatar	/ʐ/	
Telugu romanization	/dʒ/	
Turkish	/ʒ/	The letter ⟨j⟩ represents the sound /ʒ/, which only occurs in loanwords (e.g. jilet).
Turkmen	/dʒ/	
Urdu (Roman)	/dʒ/	
Welsh	/dʒ/	Only found in loanwords, usually from English but still in wide use such as jeli /ˈdʒɛlɪ/ ('jelly') and jîns /dʒɪnz/ ('jeans').
Wu Chinese (Wugniu)	/dʑ/, /dʐ/ (in some varieties)	
Yoruba	/ɟ/	
Zulu	/dʒ/	

=== English ===
In English, ⟨j⟩ most commonly represents the affricate /dʒ/. In Old English, /dʒ/ was represented orthographically with ⟨cᵹ⟩ (equivalent to ⟨cg⟩, as ⟨ᵹ⟩ in Old English was simply the regular form of the letter G, called Insular G). Middle English scribes began to use ⟨i⟩ (later ⟨j⟩) to represent word-initial /dʒ/ under the influence of Old French, which had a similarly pronounced phoneme deriving from Latin /j/ (for example, iest and later jest), while the same sound in other positions could be spelled as ⟨dg⟩ (for example, hedge). The first English-language books clearly distinguishing ⟨i⟩ and ⟨j⟩ were the King James Bible 1st Revision Cambridge 1629 and an English grammar book published in 1633.

Later, many other uses of ⟨i⟩ (later ⟨j⟩) were added in loanwords from French and other languages (e.g. adjoin, junta). In loanwords such as bijou or Dijon, ⟨j⟩ may represent /ʒ/, as in modern French. In some loanwords, including raj, Azerbaijan and Beijing, the regular pronunciation /dʒ/ is actually closer to the native pronunciation, making the use of /ʒ/ an instance of hyperforeignism, a type of hypercorrection. Occasionally, ⟨j⟩ represents its original /j/ sound, as in Hallelujah and fjord. In words of Spanish origin, such as jalapeño, English speakers usually pronounce ⟨j⟩ as the voiceless glottal fricative /h/, an approximation of the Spanish pronunciation of ⟨j⟩ (usually transcribed as a voiceless velar fricative [x], although some varieties of Spanish use glottal [h]).

In English, ⟨j⟩ is the fourth least frequently used letter in words, being more frequent than only ⟨z⟩, ⟨q⟩, and ⟨x⟩. It is, however, quite common in proper nouns, especially personal names.

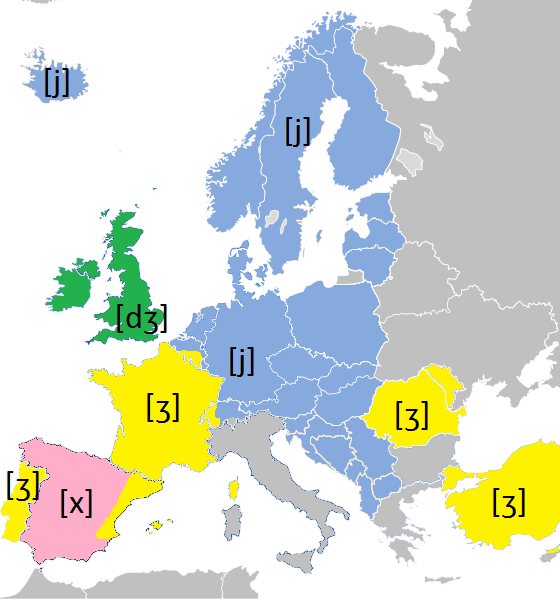
Pronunciation of ⟨j⟩ in different European languages

=== Romance languages ===
In the Romance languages, ⟨j⟩ has generally developed from its original palatal approximant value in Latin to some kind of fricative. In French, Portuguese, Catalan (except Valencian), and Romanian it has been fronted to the postalveolar fricative /ʒ/ (like ⟨s⟩ in English measure). In Valencian and Occitan, it has the same sound as in English, /dʒ/. In Spanish, by contrast, it has been both devoiced and backed from an earlier /ʝ/ to a present-day /x/ (also /χ/) or /h/, with the actual phonetic realization depending on the speaker's dialect.

⟨j⟩ is not commonly used in modern standard Italian spelling. Only proper nouns (such as Jesi and Letojanni), Latin words (Juventus), or words borrowed from foreign languages have ⟨j⟩. The proper nouns and Latin words are pronounced with the palatal approximant /j/, while words borrowed from foreign languages tend to follow that language's pronunciation of ⟨j⟩. Until the 19th century, ⟨j⟩ was used instead of non-syllabic ⟨i⟩ in word-initial and intervocalic positions (as in Savoja) and as a replacement for final -ii (pronounced simply /i/, e.g. principj instead of principii); this rule was quite strict in official writing. ⟨j⟩ is also used to render /j/ in dialectal spelling, e.g. Romanesco dialect ajo [ˈajjo] 'garlic' (cf. Italian aglio [ˈaʎʎo]). The Italian novelist Luigi Pirandello used ⟨j⟩ in vowel groups in his works written in Italian; he also wrote in his native Sicilian language, which still uses the letter ⟨j⟩ to represent /j/ (and sometimes also [dʒ] or [gj], depending on its environment).

=== Other European languages ===
The great majority of Germanic languages, such as German, Dutch, Icelandic, Swedish, Danish and Norwegian, use ⟨j⟩ for the palatal approximant /j/, which is usually represented by the letter ⟨y⟩ in English. Other than English, notable exceptions are Scots, where it represents /dʒ/, and Luxembourgish, where it represents both /j/ and /ʒ/.

The letter also represents /j/ in almost all of Europe such as Albanian, the Uralic languages that use the Latin script, and those Slavic and Baltic languages that use the Latin alphabet, such as Polish, Czech, Serbo-Croatian, Slovak, Slovenian, Latvian and Lithuanian. Some related languages, such as Serbo-Croatian and Macedonian, also adopted ⟨j⟩ into the Cyrillic alphabet for the same purpose.

The Maltese language, though a Semitic language, has been deeply influenced by the Romance languages (especially Sicilian), and also uses ⟨j⟩ for /j/.

Regional realisations of ⟨j⟩ in Basque

In Basque, the diaphoneme represented by ⟨j⟩ has a variety of realizations according to the regional dialect: [j, ɟ, dʒ, ʒ, ʃ, χ] (the last one is typical of Gipuzkoa).

Irish and Welsh are some of the few languages in Europe where ⟨j⟩ stands for /dʒ/, but the letter ⟨j⟩ itself is rare in those languages. In Welsh, ⟨j⟩ is only found in loanwords, usually from English but still in wide use such as jeli /ˈdʒɛlɪ/ ('jelly') and jîns /dʒɪnz/ ('jeans'), and in Irish, ⟨j⟩ is only used in relatively new loanwords, such as jab, júdó, and jíp; as such, it is not officially part of the Irish alphabet.

=== Other languages ===
Among non-European languages that have adopted the Latin script, ⟨j⟩ stands for /ʒ/ in Turkish and Azerbaijani, for /ʐ/ in Tatar, and for /dʒ/ in Indonesian, Somali, Malay, Igbo, Shona, Oromo, Turkmen, and Zulu. It represents a voiced palatal plosive /ɟ/ in Konkani, Yoruba and Swahili. In Kiowa, ⟨j⟩ stands for a voiceless alveolar plosive, /t/.

⟨j⟩ stands for /dʒ/ in the romanization systems (e. g. IAST) of most of the languages of India, such as Hindi and Telugu, and stands for /dʑ/ in the Hepburn romanization of Japanese and for [ts] ~ [tɕ] or [dz] ~ [dʑ] (positional variants of the same phoneme) in the Revised Romanization and North Korean romanization of Korean (only [dz] ~ [dʑ] in McCune–Reischauer).

For Chinese languages, ⟨j⟩ stands for /t͡ɕ/ in the Mandarin Chinese pinyin system, the unaspirated equivalent of ⟨q⟩ (/t͡ɕʰ/). In Wade–Giles, ⟨j⟩ stands for Mandarin Chinese /ʐ/. Pe̍h-ōe-jī of Hokkien and Tâi-lô for Taiwanese Hokkien, ⟨j⟩ stands for /z/ and /ʑ/, or /d͡z/ and /d͡ʑ/, depending on accents. In Cantonese, ⟨j⟩ stands for /j/ in Jyutping and ILE romanization of Cantonese and /t͡s/ in Yale.

The Royal Thai General System of Transcription does not use the letter ⟨j⟩, although it is used in some proper names and non-standard transcriptions to represent either จ [tɕ] or ช [tɕʰ] (the latter following Pali/Sanskrit root equivalents).

In romanized Pashto, ⟨j⟩ represents ځ, pronounced [dz].

In Greenlandic and in the Qaniujaaqpait spelling of the Inuktitut language, ⟨j⟩ is used to transcribe /j/.

Following Spanish usage, ⟨j⟩ represents [x] or similar sounds in many Latin-alphabet-based writing systems for indigenous languages of the Americas, such as [χ] in Mayan languages (ALMG alphabet) and a glottal fricative [h] in some spelling systems used for Aymara.

In the Kazakh orthography that was used from 1938 to 1940, ⟨j⟩ represented the vowel [ɘ] and corresponded to the modern Kazakh Cyrillic ⟨і⟩ and Latin-script ⟨i⟩.

=== Other writing systems ===
In the International Phonetic Alphabet, ⟨j⟩ is used for the voiced palatal approximant, and a superscript ⟨ʲ⟩ is used to represent palatalization.

== Other uses ==
- In international licence plate codes, J stands for Japan.
- In mathematics, j is one of the three imaginary units of quaternions.
- Also in mathematics, j is one of the three unit vectors.
- In the Metric system, J is the symbol for the joule, the SI derived unit for energy.
- In some areas of physics, electrical engineering and related fields, j is the symbol for the imaginary unit (the square root of −1) (in other fields, the letter i is used, but this would be ambiguous as it is also the symbol for current).
- A J can be a slang term for a joint (marijuana cigarette)

== Related characters ==
- 𐤉 : Semitic letter Yodh, from which the following symbols originally derive:
- I i : Latin letter I, from which J derives
- ȷ : Dotless j
- ᶡ : Modifier letter small dotless j with stroke
- ᶨ : Modifier letter small j with crossed-tail
- IPA-specific symbols related to J: ʝ ɟ ʲ ʄ 𐞘
- Uralic Phonetic Alphabet-specific symbols related to J:
  - U+1D0A ᴊ LATIN LETTER SMALL CAPITAL J
  - U+1D36 ᴶ MODIFIER LETTER CAPITAL J
  - U+2C7C ⱼ LATIN SUBSCRIPT SMALL LETTER J
- J with diacritics: J́ j́ Ĵ ĵ J̌ ǰ Ɉ ɉ J̃ j̇̃

== Other representations ==
=== Computing ===
- U+004A J LATIN CAPITAL LETTER J
- U+006A j LATIN SMALL LETTER J
- U+0237 ȷ LATIN SMALL LETTER DOTLESS J (primarily used in the Swedish Dialect Alphabet (Landsmålsalfabet) and in mathematics).
- U+FF2A Ｊ FULLWIDTH LATIN CAPITAL LETTER J
- U+FF4A ｊ FULLWIDTH LATIN SMALL LETTER J

In Unicode, a duplicate of 'J' for use as a special phonetic character in historical Greek linguistics is encoded in the Greek script block as U+037F Ϳ GREEK CAPITAL LETTER YOT for the uppercase and U+03F3 ϳ GREEK LETTER YOT for the lowercase. It is used to denote the palatal glide /j/ in the context of Greek script. It is called "Yot" in the Unicode standard, after the German name of the letter J. An uppercase version of this letter was added to the Unicode Standard at U+037F with the release of version 7.0 in June 2014.

==== Wingdings smiley issue ====
In the Wingdings font by Microsoft, the letter "J" was rendered as a smiley face, sometimes creating confusion in emails after formatting is removed and a smiley turned back into an out-of-context "J".

=== Other ===
NATO phonetic	Morse code
Juliet	▄ ▄▄▄ ▄▄▄ ▄▄▄

Signal flag

Flag semaphore
American manual alphabet (ASL fingerspelling)
British manual alphabet (BSL fingerspelling)
Braille dots-245
Unified English Braille
