= Konkomba =

Konkomba may refer to:

- Konkomba people, an ethnic group of Ghana, Togo and Burkina Faso
- Konkomba language spoken by this people
