= Anjemi =

Yoruba written in Arabic script

Anjẹmi or Yoruba Ajami (أَنْجَِمِ) refers to the tradition and practice of writing the Yoruba language using the Arabic script, as part of the tradition among Muslims of West Africa at large, referred to as the Ajami script. These include the orthography of various Fula dialects, Hausa, Wolof, and more.

== Background ==
Islam came into Yorubaland around the 14th century, as a result of trade with Wangara (also Wankore) merchants, a mobile caste of the Soninkes from the then Mali Empire. Progressively, Islam started to gain a foothold in Yorubaland over the 18th and 19th centuries, that by the end of the 19th century, all major Yoruba cities had a sizeable minority Muslim population. One consequence of this daily use of the Arabic language and the accompanying practice of establishing Arabic schools to teach new converts, was the gradual inroad of a considerable amount of Arabic-derived words and expressions relating to Islamic worship and other subjects into the Yoruba language. Another consequence was the adoption of the Arabic script by Yoruba scholars and literaturists to try and write the Yoruba language. Although it is worth pointing out that at the time, there was no unified orthographic conventions, no adaptation to represent consonants or vowels unique to Yoruba and the writing was simply done with the base Arabic consonants and vowels.

From the 1840s onward, European evangelists and missionaries had arrived to Yorubaland, and from the 1860s onward, British colonial rule was established in Yorubaland. In these decades, the missionaries, in collaboration with the colonial government were eager to create and standardize an orthographic system for Yoruba. The missionaries were interested in translating the Bible and other religious texts to Yoruba for their task of evangelizing, and the colonial government was interested in establishing secular universal education. These efforts borne fruit in 1875, when a Latin-based orthography was finalized and adopted. Anjẹmi was ignored and excluded from this process. First that this was an era in which European missionaries, linguists, and ethnographers were interested in a more universal and standardized alphabet, a more "modern" alphabet in contrast with the antiquated Arabic. A movement that was to encompass languages such as Ottoman Turkish, Circassian, Malay, and many more. The second reason was that the primary aim of the European advocates for a standard Yoruba orthography were missionaries whose goal was to detach the local population from familiarity with Islam. And last, there was an economic motive too. Latin characters were easily available and affordable for printing press in England. Arabic letters, let alone custom letters that were to be created for exclusive writing of Yoruba, were not. Furthermore, unlike Hausa and Fulfulde, at the time it was hard for Europeans to find many actual Anjẹmi manuscripts and documents, which led them to believe that Anjẹmi wasn't even a popular way of writing Yoruba among Muslims themselves.

== History ==
These aforementioned developments, while creating anxiety among Yoruba Muslims from fear of marginalization, resulted in a sharp decline in production of any books, publications, or pedagogical material in Anjẹmi. For the next following decades, much of the writing done by Yoruba Muslims was either in Yoruba Latin Alphabet, in English, or in Arabic. There was no encouragement, official sanction, or grassroots movement in favour of Anjẹmi. From the little Yoruba documents from this period that were written in Anjẹmi, the following conclusions can be drawn:

1. The Maghrebi script was preferred, meaning that for the letter fāʾ has its dot written underneath, ڢـ ڢ; and the letter qāf has its dots reduced from two to one, ڧـ ڧ.
2. The Arabic letter bāʾ, ب is used for representing the sound [b], but also two uniquely Yoruba consonants [p] and [ɡ͡b].
3. Yoruba vowels were represented by the three Arabic diacritics.
4. The sound [l] was occasionally written with the ḍād letter ض. (A coincidentally similar phenomenon exists in Arabi-Tamil and Arabi-Malayalam scripts of Muslim communities of Southern India where the letter ۻ is used for representing [ɭ])
5. And lastly, a lack of uniformity to the point that one author's texts would've been unintelligible to other authors. This apparently gave rise to a Yoruba proverb alanjẹmi l'anjẹmii ye (أَلَنْجَِمِ لآنجَِمِی یَٜ) meaning Only an Anjẹmi author can understand his own Anjẹmi.

However, Yoruba Anjẹmi received renewed attention from 1989 onwards. The script has undergone a process of revival and an incremental process of standardization and uniformation since then. A Muslim scholar from Ilorin by the name Alhaji Abubakar Yusuf can be credited for the start of this process. He is the leader of the Sufi order of Tijaniyyah in the Ilorin region. He has so far published five primers and two posters outlining his ideas and proposals with respect to standardization and improvements to be made on Yoruba Anjẹmi.

The significance of the publications by Alhaji Abubakar Yusuf lie more so in demonstrating him being a pioneer in advocating and encouraging a standardization of rules and conventions. The rules and conventions, especially as they concern Yoruba vowels are on their own noteworthy as well. In pursuit of his goal of getting the Yoruba Muslim community on board with his vision, Alhaji Abubakar Yusuf went ahead and consulted with several prominent Yoruba Muslim leaders in the field of education, as well as secular academics in relevant fields. In one of the later pamphlets published by Alhaji Abubakar Yusuf, he implies that he's received the support and backing of these individuals. Nevertheless, the task ahead for advocates of Anjẹmi within the Nigerian context remain difficult. The Nigerian government, flagbearer of Secularism and non-discrimination on the basis of religion may feel reluctant in supporting a script that's strongly associated with the cultural heritage of one specific religion. Similarly, non-Muslim Yoruba may feel that this movement is an agenda of Muslim Yoruba to marginalize them within the Yoruba lingual community. Thus Alhaji Abubakar Yusuf has been wise so far, in that he's framed the benefits of the cause he supports in both Islamic and Secular aspects.

== Vowels ==
The major point of contrast between Yoruba and Arabic, is their vowel systems. As will be later discussed, consonants more or less match between the two language, with only two additional letters needed to represent Yoruba sounds. But for vowels, Arabic has 3 vowels, with each having a short type and a long type, whereas Yoruba has 6, with each having a short and a long type, and each having either a high tone, a low tone, or a mid tone. In the previously mentioned revival movement since the 1990s, one of the focuses was resolving this shortcoming of Anjẹmi by including in the agreed-upon orthographic convention, methods of representing vowels. As it stands right now (meaning that incrementally, in the future, additional conventions and proposals may improve the situation further), all 6 Yoruba vowels have their own notation, with some but not all, having a "long vowel" variant too (similar to Arabic, with the use of mater lectionis). Tones are not represented in any way. Only a handful of traditions and conventions of writing using the Arabic script represent tones, and none are in nearby communities in West Africa (They are Rohingya in Southeast Asia, Burushaski and Shina in Central Asia).

Vowel at the beginning of a word
A	E	Ẹ	I	O	Ọ	U
Short Vowels
أَ	عَٜـ / عَٜ	عَِـ / عَِ	إِ	عُواْ	عُو	ءُ / وُ
Long Vowels
Aa	Ee	Ẹẹ	Ii	Oo	Ọọ	Uu
آ	عَٜیـ / عَٜی	عَِیـ / عَِی	إِیـ / إِی	عُواْ	عُو	ءُ / وُ

Vowel at the middle of a word
a	e	ẹ	i	o	ọ	u	∅
Short Vowels
◌َ	◌َٜ	◌َِ	◌ِ	◌ُـواْ	◌ُـو	◌ُ	◌ْ
Long Vowels
aa	ee	ẹẹ	ii	oo	ọọ	uu	
◌َـا	◌َٜـیـ / ◌َٜـی	◌َِـیـ / ◌َِـی	◌َـیـ / ◌َـی	◌ُـواْ	◌ُـو	◌ُ	

Vowel at the end of a word
a	e	ẹ	i	o	ọ	u	∅
◌َـا	◌َٜـی	◌َِـی	◌َـی	◌ُـواْ	◌ُـو	◌ُ	◌ْ

== Letters ==
Table below illustrates the Yoruba Anjẹmi alphabet, the yellow highlights indicating letters that are exclusively used for writing loanwords and do not correspond to independent phonemes, 10 in total. Green highlights the two unique new letters that have been adopted for use in Yoruba, and don't have any equivalent in Arabic.

The letters alif and its variations (ا / أ / إ / آ), as well as the letter ayn (ع) are exclusively used as vowel carriers and do not have a sound of their own. The letters wā (و) and yāʾ (ی) serve two functions, either as vowel carriers with no sound of their own, or as a consonant, representing sounds [w] and [j] respectively.

Yoruba Anjẹmi alphabet
Arabic (Latin) [IPA]	ا / أ / إ ‌( - / ’ / A a ) [∅]/[ʔ]/[aː]	ب ‌(B b) [b]	پ ‌(P p) [k͜p] / [p]	ت ‌(T t) [t]	ث ‌(S s) [s]	ج ‌(J j) [d͡ʒ]
Arabic (Latin) [IPA]	ح ‌( - / H h) [h]/[ʔ]	خ ‌(H h) [h]([x])	د ‌(D d) [d]	ذ ‌(J j) [d͡ʒ]([z])	ر (R r) [r]	ز ‌(J j) [d͡ʒ]([z])
Arabic (Latin) [IPA]	س ‌(S s) [s]	ش ‌(Ṣ ṣ) [ʃ]‍	ص ‌(S s) [s]	ض ‌(L l) [l]	ط ‌(T t) [t]	ظ ‌(J j) [d͡ʒ]([z])
Arabic (Latin) [IPA]	ع ‌(- / ’ ) [∅]/[ʔ]	غ ‌(G g) [ɡ]	ڠ ‌(Gb gb) [ɡ͡b]	ف ‌(F f) [f]	ق ‌(K k) [k]	ك ‌(K k) [k]
Arabic (Latin) [IPA]	ل ‌(L l) [l]	م ‌(M m) [m]	ن ‌(N n) [n]/[ŋ̍]/[◌̃]	ه ‌( - / H h) [h]/[ʔ]	و ‌(W w/O o/Ọ ọ) [w]/[o]/[ɔ]	ی ‌(Y y/Ii ii) [j]/[iː]
Arabic (Latin) [IPA]	ء / ؤ / ئ ‌( - / ’ ) [∅]/[ʔ]					

== Sample Text ==
Below text is a sample Anjemi text, the translation of the first Chapter of the Quran, Surat al-Fatiha, into Yoruba.

Latin Yoruba script	Anjemi script	Original Arabic	English translation
Ni orukọ Ọlọhun, Ajọkẹ aiye, Aṣakẹ ọrun «1»	نِی عُواْرُكُو اُوللُوهُنْ، أَجُوكَِی أَیَٜی، أَشَكَِی عُورُنْ ۝١	بِسْمِ ٱللَّهِ ٱلرَّحْمَـٰنِ ٱلرَّحِيمِ ۝١	In the name of God, the Most Compassionate, Most Merciful. «1»
Gbogbo ọpẹ ti Ọlọhun ni, Olutọju gbogbo ẹda «2»	ڠُواْڠُواْ عُوپَِی تِی اُوللُوهُنْ نِی، عُواْلُتُوجُ ڠُواْڠُواْ عََِدَا ۝۲	ٱلْحَمْدُ لِلَّهِ رَبِّ ٱلْعَـٰلَمِينَ ۝٢	Praise be to God, Lord of the worlds— «2»
Ajọkẹ aiye, Aṣakẹ ọrun «3»	أَجُوكَِی أَیَٜی، أَشَكَِی عُورُنْ ۝۳	ٱلرَّحْمَـٰنِ ٱلرَّحِيمِ ۝٣	the Most Compassionate, Most Merciful, «3»
Olukapa ọjọ idajọ «4»	عُواْلُكَاپَا عُوجُو إِدَاجُو ۝٤	مَـٰلِكِ يَوْمِ ٱلدِّينِ ۝٤	Owner of the Day of Judgement. «4»
Irẹ nikan ni awa yio ma sin, ọdọ Rẹ nikan ni a o ma tọrọ Iran lọwo «5»	إِرَِی نِكَنْ نِی أَوَا یِیُواْ مَاسِنْ، عُودُورَِی نِكَنْ نِ أ عُواْ مَا تُورُو إِرَنْ لُووُو ۝٥	إِيَّاكَ نَعْبُدُ وَإِيَّاكَ نَسْتَعِينُ ۝٥	You we worship and You we ask for help. «5»
Tọ wa si ọna tārà. «6»	تُووَا سِی عُونَا تَارَا ۝٦	ٱهْدِنَا ٱلصِّرَٰطَ ٱلْمُسْتَقِيمَ ۝٦	Guide us to the straight path— «6»
Ọna awọn ẹniti Ose idẹra Rẹfun, pẹlu titẹle aṣẹ Rẹ ati ijọsin fun Ẹ laijẹ (ọna) awọn ti Obinu Si, bẹni laijẹ ọna awọn ti nwọn sina.«7»	عُونَا أَوُونْ عَِنِتِی عُواْسَٜی أِدَِرَا رَِفُنْ پَِلُ تِتَِلَٜی أَشَِی رَِی أَتِی إِجُوسِنْ فُن عَِی لَایْجَِی (عُونَا) أَوُونْ تِی عُواْبِنُ سِی، بَِنِی لَایْجَِی عُونَا أَوُونْ تِینْوُونْ سِنَا ۝۷	صِرَٰطَ ٱلَّذِينَ أَنْعَمْتَ عَلَيْهِمْ غَيْرِ ٱلْمَغْضُوبِ عَلَيْهِمْ وَلَا ٱلضَّآلِّينَ ۝٧	the path of those You have favored, not those You are angry with or those who are astray. «7»
