= Tchitcherik =

Ancestral statue of Moba

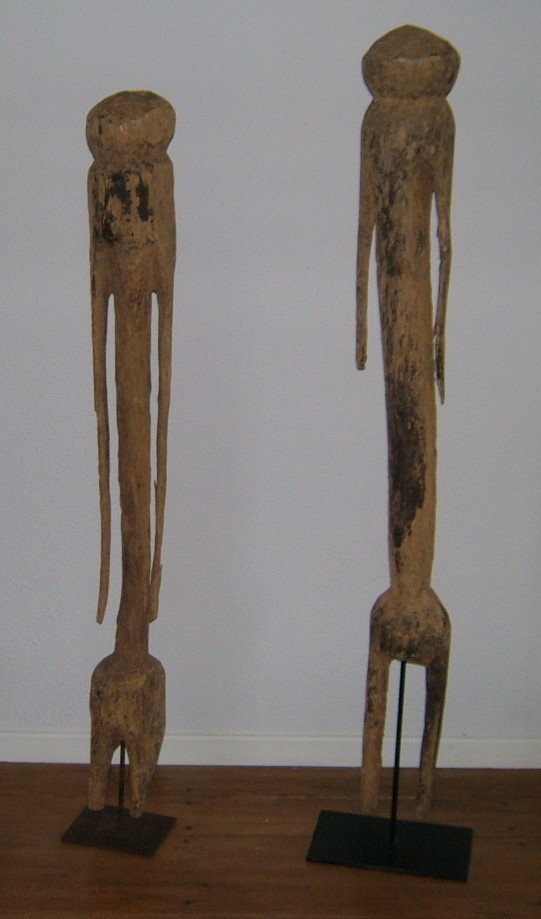
Tchitcheri sakab of the Moba people

A tchitcherik or tchitcherik sakwa (plural: tchitcheri sakab) is a statue of the ancestors of the Moba of northern Togo and Ghana.

== Uses ==
Tchitcheri sakab are wooden sculptures of varying sizes (around a metre in general) that represent figures of ancestors, the word sakab meaning "ancestors" in Moba language. They are planted in the soil, sometimes up to the groin, which explains why the legs are often eaten by xylophagus insects. The tchitcheri are named after the clan of the ancestors they are supposed to honor.

Only the diviners can order such a sculpture, they also determine its size and sex. The tchitcheri are minimalist sculptures reminiscent of abstract art, a cylindrical trunk with straight arms and legs, surmounted by a round head and without neck.

== See also ==
- Moba people

== Bibliography ==
- Douglas Newton, African and Oceanic Art in Jerusalem: The Israel Museum, Muzeʼon Yiśraʼel (Jerusalem), 2001
- Annie Dupuis, Jacques Ivanoff, Ethnocentrisme et création, 2014
- Dieter Gleisberg, Merkur & die Musen: Schätze der Weltkultur aus Leipzig, 1989
- Mein Afrika: die Sammlung Fritz Koenig, 2000
