= Ntcham =

Ntcham may be,

- Ntcham language (Bassari)
  - Ntcham Braille
- Olivier Ntcham
