= Nigerian braille =

Braille alphabets used in Nigeria

Several braille alphabets are used in Nigeria. For English, Unified English Braille has been adopted. Three other languages have been written in braille: Hausa, Igbo, and Yoruba. All three alphabets are based on English readings, with the addition of letters particular to these languages. Punctuation is as in English Braille.

Basic braille alphabet
⠁ (braille pattern dots-1)	⠃ (braille pattern dots-12)	⠉ (braille pattern dots-14)	⠙ (braille pattern dots-145)	⠑ (braille pattern dots-15)	⠋ (braille pattern dots-124)	⠛ (braille pattern dots-1245)	⠓ (braille pattern dots-125)	⠊ (braille pattern dots-24)	⠚ (braille pattern dots-245)	⠅ (braille pattern dots-13)	⠇ (braille pattern dots-123)	⠍ (braille pattern dots-134)
a	b	c	d	e	f	g	h	i	j	k	l	m
⠝ (braille pattern dots-1345)	⠕ (braille pattern dots-135)	⠏ (braille pattern dots-1234)	⠟ (braille pattern dots-12345)	⠗ (braille pattern dots-1235)	⠎ (braille pattern dots-234)	⠞ (braille pattern dots-2345)	⠥ (braille pattern dots-136)	⠧ (braille pattern dots-1236)	⠺ (braille pattern dots-2456)	⠭ (braille pattern dots-1346)	⠽ (braille pattern dots-13456)	⠵ (braille pattern dots-1356)
n	o	p	q	r	s	t	u	v	w	x	y	z

The letters of these languages beyond the basic Latin alphabet are as follows:

== Hausa Braille ==
Hausa Braille
- Script type: alphabet
- Print basis: Hausa alphabet
- Languages: Hausa

Related scripts
- Parent systems: Braille: English Braille; Hausa Braille

Hausa includes

kw	sh	ts	ɗ

from English q, sh, st, ed (international second d), and three derived letters:

Basic letter:	b	k	y
Derived letter:	ɓ	ƙ	ƴ

Hausa is presumably written in braille in Niger as well, since Ethnologue 17 reports that Zarma is written in braille in that country. However, this need not mean it uses the same alphabet as Nigerian Hausa.

== Igbo Braille ==
Igbo Braille
- Script type: alphabet
- Print basis: Igbo alphabet
- Languages: Igbo

Related scripts
- Parent systems: Braille: English Braille; Igbo Braille

Igbo Braille has

kw	ch	gh	sh

from English q, ch, gh, sh, and six other letters with common international/African values:

Basic letter:	b	e	i	o	u	
Extended letter:	gb	ẹ	ị	ọ	ụ	ŋ

(See Ewe Braille and Kabiye Braille for similar code assignments.)

== Yoruba Braille ==
Yoruba Braille
- Script type: alphabet
- Print basis: Yoruba alphabet
- Languages: Yoruba

Related scripts
- Parent systems: Braille: English Braille; Yoruba Braille

Yoruba Braille also has

kw	ṣ

(from English q, sh), and three derived letters:

Basic letter:	b	e	o
Derived letter:	gb	ẹ	ọ

The vowel assignments follow international conventions.
