= Kajola =

Kajola Rock city
- LGA
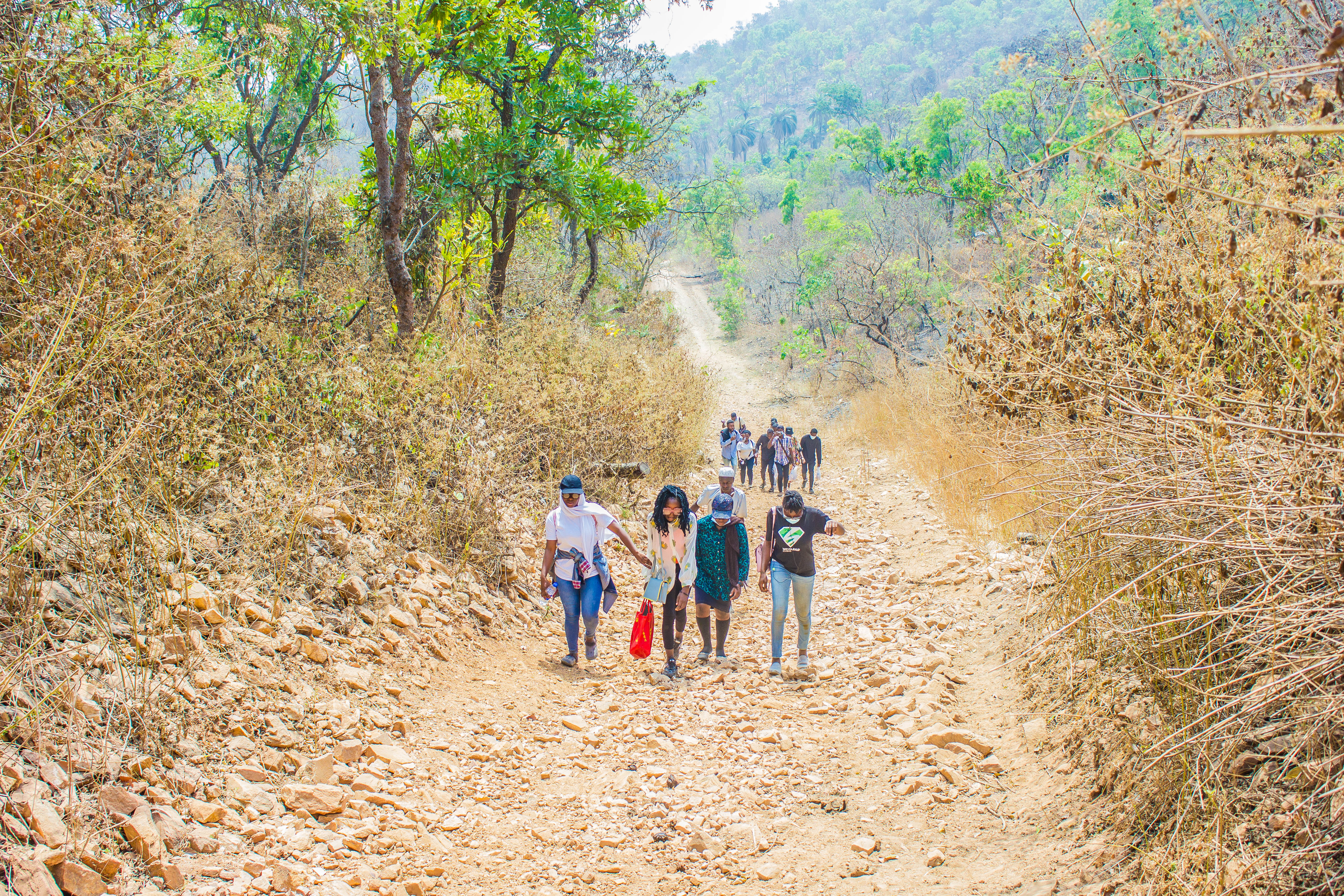
- A landscape of Kajola L.G.A
- Interactive map of Kajola
- Country: Nigeria
- State: Oyo State
- Headquarter: Okeho

Government
  - Local Government Chairman and the Head of the Local Government Council: Adebare Muraina Afolabi (PDP)

Area
  - Total: 609 km^{2} (235 sq mi)

Population (2006)
  - Total: 200,997
  - Density: 330/km^{2} (855/sq mi)
- Time zone: UTC+1 (WAT)
- Postal code: 202

Kajola is a Local Government Area in Oyo State, Nigeria. Its headquarters are in the town of Okeho.

Other major towns in Kajola LG are Ilero, Imia, Ilua, Ayetoro-oke, Isemi ile, Iwere-oke, and Ilaji-oke.

It has an area of 609 km^{2} and a population of 200,997 at the 2006 census.

The first Local Government chairman was Chief Michael Adegbite.

The postal code of the area is 202.

== Geography ==
Kajola Local Government Area has an average temperature of 28 degrees Celsius or 82.4 degrees Fahrenheit with a total area of 609 square kilometres (235 square miles). The region has dense forests and an average humidity of 60%. In Kajola Local Government Area, the average wind speed is 11 km/h (6.8 mph).

== Economy ==
Kajola Local Government Area's primary economic activity is farming, with the region cultivating crops like melon, pepper, and okara. The LGA hosts several markets where locals purchase and sell a wide range of goods, demonstrating the area's thriving trade. The residents of Kajola LGA also engage in significant economic activities such as hunting, crafting, and textile weaving and dying.
