= Okeho =

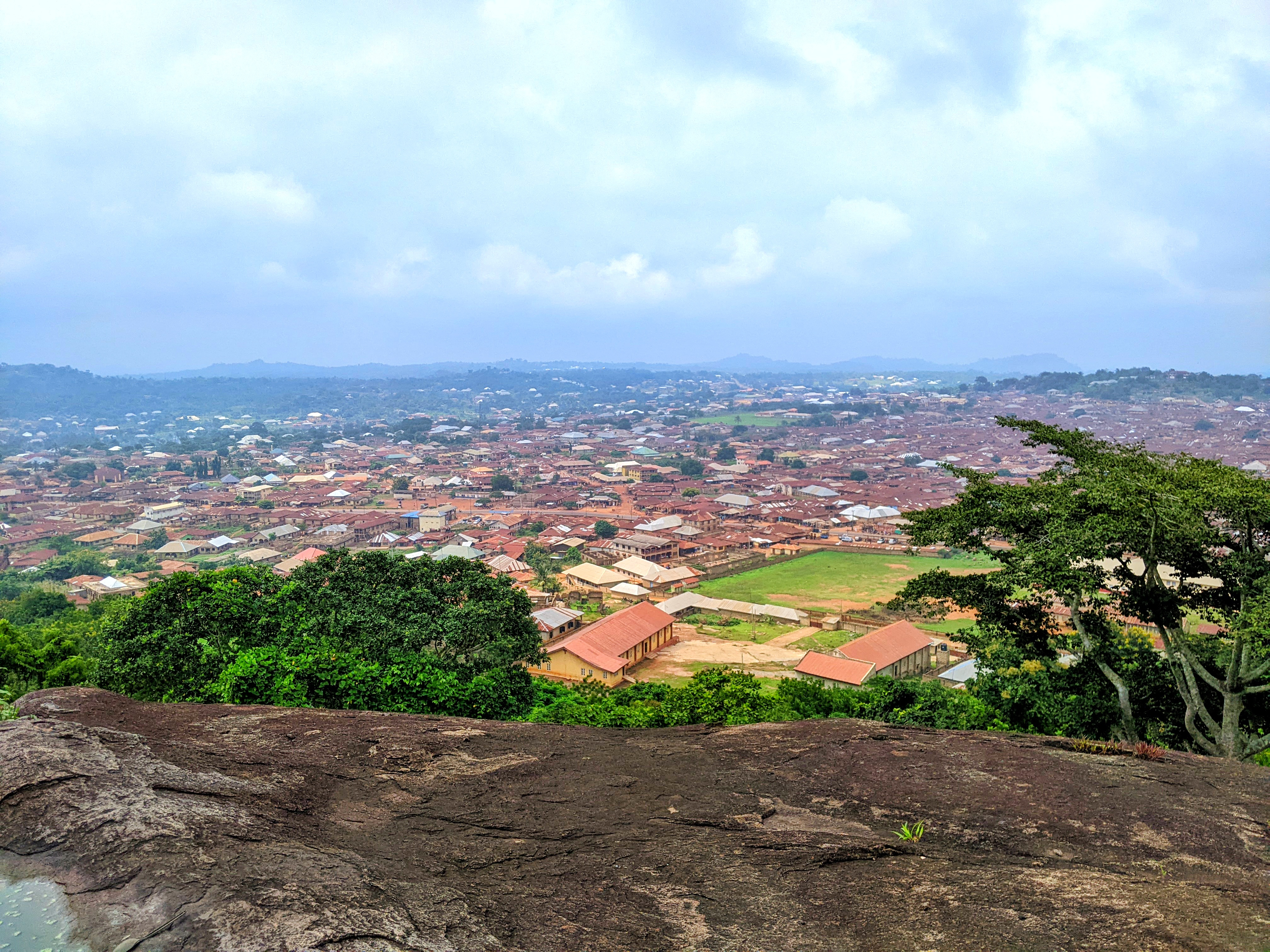
- Interactive map of Okeho

Okeho is a town located in Oyo State South West Nigeria. It is the headquarters of Kajola Local Government.

It is the home to the Federal University of Agriculture and Technology Okeho.

== Location ==
It is a valley town and a developing community in the Òkè Ógùn area of Oyo State. It is surrounded by mountains and valleys and by the towns Ilero, Ilua, Ayetoro-oke, Isemi ile, Iwere-oke, and Ilaji-oke. A valley-town is domiciled on a plateau and has a beautiful, breathtaking, lovely landscape. It is promoted as a tourist attraction. Its panoramic view is said to be glorious.

== History ==
Okeho was previously up in the hills and mountains, but it relocated to the valley due to raids from enemies. Okeho is an amalgamation of eleven villages who voluntarily decided to come together for protection and self-survival.

Okeho is an ancient town with rich history. It used to be the headquarter of Òkehò/Ìgànná District Council during the Colonial Era and many years after.

As a result of the Local Government Reforms of 1976, the name Òkehò/Ìgànná was changed to Kájọlà when Local Government.

In December 4, 1996, Ìwájọwà Local Government with headquarter in Ìwéré'lé was carved out of Kájọlà.

Apart from being the headquarter of Kájọlà Local Government Area, Òkehò is one of the biggest towns in Òkèògùn region that is located in the Ọ̀yọ́ North Senatorial District of Ọ̀yọ́ State which has ten Local Governments.

The villages that came together are Isia, Olele, Isemi, Imoba, Gbonje, Oke-Ogun, Ogan, Bode, Pamo, Alubo and Ijo.

The Baale of Ijo, the head of that settlement, was the initiator of this process and pursued it diligently as he kept inviting the other parties. This singular act of selflessness made its mark as the other leaders, who conceded the overall leadership of the new settlement.

Okeho celebrated its centenary return from the old settlement to present one in 2017.

The paramount ruler is called Onjo of Okeho, and the present one is His Royal Majesty, Oba Rafiu Osuolale Mustapha, Adeitan II. There have been eighteen Onjos till present.

== People ==
Short Oral history of Okeho in Onko language by a native speaker

The people of Okeho are of the Yoruba ethnic group. The diversity in the community is acknowledged by their distinct variation of Yoruba, called Onko and depicted in the video as an indigenous man who speaks the dialect.

== Economy ==
The indigenes are predominantly farmers and traders. Okeho is often referred to as the food basket of Oyo State. In Oheko's economy, people contribute in a single purse for the advancement of the community by sponsorship of the individuals who later pay it forward.

This system ingrained by the promotion of integrity and trust, a cultural value commonly found in the ethnic race of Yoruba's referred to as Omoluwabi. This extended to commerce and marketplaces where the traders had market delegates represent them in whom they had confidence in their abilities.
