= Oduduwa script =

Writing system for Yoruba

Odùduwà Alifabeeti Oduduwa Aebajiogbe Oduduwa
- Script type: alphabet
- Period: 2017–present
- Direction: Right-to-left
- Languages: Yoruba

Unicode
- Unicode range: Not in Unicode
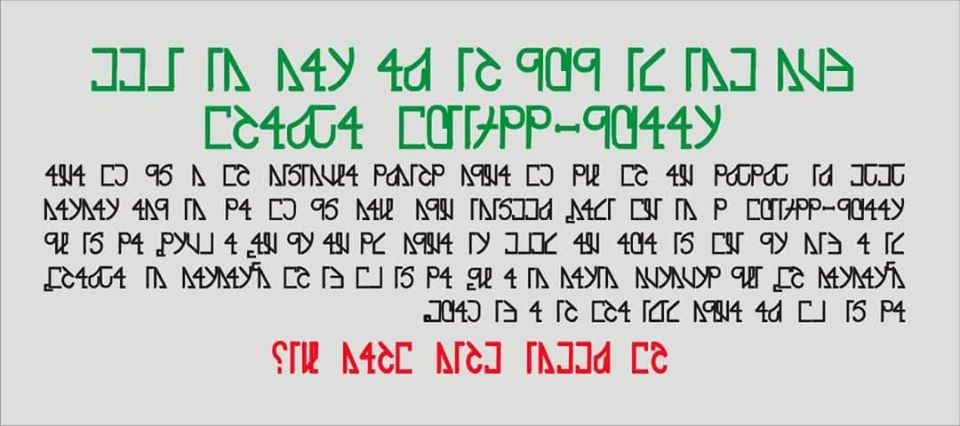

The Oduduwa script (/oʊˈduːduːwɑː/) was created in 2016 or 2017 by a Beninese Yoruba chief named Tolúlàṣẹ Ògúntósìn for the Yoruba language of Nigeria and Benin. Ògúntósìn says that the script was revealed to him by the Yoruba mythic ancestor Odùduwà in a series of dreams from 2011 to 2016, though many of the letter shapes derive from Latin script. Oduduwa has received support from other chiefs of Yorubaland in both countries as an adjunct to or possible replacement of the Latin script.

Yoruba has two Latin alphabets, one used in Nigeria and one in Benin. The Oduduwa script is also alphabetic, and is inspired by Latin orthography (e.g. /k͜p/ is written as a single letter, but /ɡ͜b/ as a digraph of the letters for /ɡ/ and /b/, paralleling the Nigerian Yoruba alphabet; similarly, the letters ⟨ẹ, ọ, ṣ⟩ are derived from ⟨e, o, s⟩, and nasal vowels are written with the letter for ⟨n⟩, again as in the Nigerian Yoruba alphabet). Oduduwa differs from Latin in being written right-to-left.

The Oduduwa script is being taught to children at schools in Porto-Novo, Benin and in Ifẹ, Nigeria.

== Ligatures ==
iwe in Oduduwa script. ⟨⟩ i (right) and ⟨⟩ w (center) merge due to their parallel vertical strokes; ⟨⟩ w and ⟨⟩ e (left) link where the ends of their horizontal strokes touch.

Adjacent letters form ligatures: when one letter ends in a long vertical stroke (i.e. ⟨⟩ d, ⟨⟩ e, ⟨⟩ h, ⟨⟩ i, ⟨⟩ m, ⟨⟩ n, ⟨⟩ o) and the next begins with a such a stroke (i.e. ⟨⟩ b, ⟨⟩ ẹ, ⟨⟩ l, ⟨⟩ ọ, ⟨⟩ r, ⟨⟩ u, ⟨⟩ w), the two lines are conflated into a single stroke, joining the letters. This occurs for example in the sequence du in the name Oduduwa (see info box above). Where a horizontal line meets another (as in ⟨⟩ w and ⟨⟩ a), or with a sharp angle (as in ⟨⟩ n and ⟨⟩ i), they may also join; thus iwe forms a double ligature (see image at right), though this is optional and is avoided in careful script.

== Digits ==
There is a series of ten digits for writing decimal numbers, which derive from the Hindu-Arabic numerals (and which are also written right-to-left), and basic punctuation (. , : ; - ? apostrophe and quotation marks). Tone is not marked.

== Gallery ==
=== Letters ===
a

e

b

j

o

gb

d

f

t

ẹ

ọ

l

w

u

m

n

i

h

r

s

ṣ

k

g

y

p

=== Digits ===
0

1

2

3

4

5

6

7

8

9

=== Punctuation ===
hyphen

question mark
