= Gurma languages =

Language family

Gurma
- West Mabia
- Geographic distribution: Eastern Burkina Faso, northern Ghana, Togo and Benin, western Niger
- Linguistic classification: Niger–Congo?: Atlantic–Congo; Savannas; Gur; Northern; Gurma

Language codes
- Glottolog: gurm1249

The Gurma languages, also known as the West Mabia languages, form part of the Oti–Volta subgroup of the Gur languages. They are spoken in eastern Burkina Faso, northern Ghana, Togo and Benin and western Niger.

The languages are:

- Ngangam
- Gourmanchéma (Gurma)
- Moba (Bimoba)
- Ntcham (Akaselem)
- Miyobe
- Konkomba
