= Konkomba language =

Gurma language of Ghana and Togo

Konkomba
- Likpakpaanl
- Region: Ghana, Togo
- Ethnicity: Konkomba people
- Native speakers: 920,000 (2012–2013)
- Language family: Niger–Congo?: Atlantic–Congo; Volta-Congo; Savannas; Gur; Northern Gur; Oti–Volta; Gurma; Konkomba
- Writing system: Latin (Konkomba alphabet); Konkomba Braille

Language codes
- ISO 639-3: xon
- Glottolog: konk1269

- People: Bikpakpaam
- Language: Likpakpaanl

Distribution of Konkomba speakers

Konkomba, known natively as Likpakpaanl, is a Gurma language spoken in Ghana, Togo and Burkina Faso. It is spoken by the Konkomba people, who are also known as the Bikpakpaam.

== Geography ==
Konkomba is spoken in Ghana (Northern Region, Volta Region, Brong Ahafo Region, Eastern Region and Accra), and Togo (Savanes Region, Kara Region and Plateaux Region). Smaller numbers can also found in Burkina Faso.

== Dialects ==
The Konkomba language has several dialects, including, but not limited to, Lichaboil, Ligbeln, Likoonli, Limonkpeln and Linafeel.

== Documentation ==
The dialects of Konkomba emerged because different families and groups settled together and adopted unique pronunciation and vocabulary patterns, forming what could be called uniform dialect groupings. For example, "map geek" in (in the Lichabol dialect), "may LAK Iya" (in the Limonkpeln dialect), and "many men" (in the Likoon dialect) all mean "I don't like that". This type of variation can be heard in Konkomba, depending on the geographic area or what clan is dominant in a particular settlement. However, Lichaboil dialect is the written variety. Other Bikpakpaam dialects classifications include Linankpel (Nankpantiib), Likpalil (Bikpalib), Linandeln (Binandim), Lisagmaln (Sagmantiib), and Linalol (Binalob).

A reasonable amount of Konkomba literature exists. This literature includes primers for teaching, a dictionary, storybooks, and folk tales. There is also a full translation of the Bible in Konkomba, created through the work of GILLBT and GIL, Mary Steele, and RILADEP (formerly KOLADEP, Konkomba Literacy and Development Project). Work on the Konkomba Bible translation was started by Mary Steele in 1962 when she arrived to work with the Wycliffe Bible Translators.

== Classification ==
Konkomba is a Gur language. It is related to the Bimoba language spoken by the Bimoba people of Ghana, to the Moba language spoken by the Moba people of Togo and Burkina Faso, and to the Bassari language spoken by the Bassari people of Togo and Ghana. It is part of the Gurma subgroup, which also includes several other languages such as Gourmanche and Miyobe.

== Phonology ==
=== Consonants ===
		Labial	Alveolar	Palatal	Velar	Labio- velar
Plosive/ Affricate	voiceless	p	t	t͡ʃ	k	k͡p
Plosive/ Affricate	voiced	b	d	d͡ʒ	ɡ	ɡ͡b
Fricative		f	s			
Nasal		m	n	ɲ	ŋ	ŋ͡m
Approximant		w	l	j		
Trill			r			

=== Vowels ===
	Front	Central	Back
Close	ɪ iː		ʊ uː
Close-mid	e eː		o oː
Open-mid	ɛ ɛː		ɔ ɔː
Open	æ	a aː	

Nasalization among vowel sounds is also heard when preceding nasal consonants.

== Orthography ==
=== Alphabet ===
==== Capital letters ====
A, B, (C), CH, D, E, F, G, GB, I, J, K, KP, L, M, N, NY, Ŋ, ŊM, O, Ɔ, P, R, S, T, U, W, Y.

===== Lower-case letters =====
a, b, (c), ch, d, e, f, g, gb, i, j, k, kp, l, m, n, ny, ŋ, ŋm, o, ɔ, p, r, s, t, u, w, y.

The orthography follows that used in the literature currently in print in Konkomba. Under the current convention, long and short vowels are distinguished by the use of single and double letters respectively. (e.g. a, aa). Tone is not marked, but where two words contrast only in tone and the context is unlikely to indicate a distinction in meaning, an "h" is added after the vowel in one of the words (e.g. upii – woman, upiih – sheep).

Certain variations that may occur in the a given speaker's speech. For example, sometimes a speaker may use the /r/ sound and sometimes the /l/ sound. Also, there may be variations between one speaker and another within the same village (e.g. some use the plural tiib and some teeb). This is, however, at the phonological level and does not affect semantic interpretation.

The letter c outside the digraph ch is listed by GILLBT's Likpakpaani Dictionary, but not in other sources.

== Grammar ==
=== Lexical tone ===
Differences in tone can change the lexical function of a particular word. In contrast to many other Gur languages, Konkomba tones have no grammatical function.

úpíí
"woman"

úpìì
"sheep"

=== Grammatical tone ===
There are two-level tones; low (⸜) and high (⸝), which are used to distinguish between perfective and habitual aspects. The tones do not change regardless of the person specification of the noun or a pronoun.

N dàà lòòr.
1SG buy.PFV car
"I have bought a car."

Bì chèè ì-mùùl.
3PL harvest.PFV NC-rice
"They harvested rice."

N dáá lòòr-tiib
1SG buy.HAB car-PL
"I buy cars regularly."

Bì chéé ì-mùùl.
3PL harvest.HAB NC-rice
"They harvest rice regularly."

=== Noun classes ===
Noun class	Singular	Plural	Singular suffix	Plural suffix/circumfix	Glossing
1/2	u-ja	Bi-ja-b	u-	bi...-b	man
3/4	n-lan	i-lan	n-	i-	song
5/6	li-kuu-l	ŋi-ku	li-	ŋi-	hoe
14/*ci	Bu-su-b	i-su-i	bu-...-b	i-...-i	tree
12/21	ki-saa-k	ti-saa-r	ki-...-k	n-...-m	knife
20	---	---	tiwan-kaan	---	generic reference
22/12	n-yaa-n	---	n-...-n	---	salt

=== Pronouns ===
==== Personal pronouns ====
Personal pronouns can either occur preverbally or postvebally. In both cases, there is an additional distinction in the third person with regard to animacy.

===== Preverbal =====
Preverbal personal pronouns are used as subjects. Which form for the first person pronoun is used, depends on the phonology of the following word.

Person	Singular	Plural	Gloss
1st	m/n	tì	I/we
2nd	à	nì	you/you all
3rd [+human]	ù	bì	he/she/they
3rd [-human]	ù	ì	it/they

===== Postverbal =====
Postverbal personal pronouns are used as objects.

Person	Singular	Plural	Gloss
1st	mì	tì	I/we
2nd	sì	nì	you/you all
3rd [+human]	ù	bì	he/she/they
3rd [-human]	ù	ì	it/they

==== Emphatic pronouns ====
Emphatic pronouns are formed by a personal pronoun and an additional suffix. This suffix is in singular -ìn or -mà, whereas in the plural the suffix is -mì or -mà.

Person	Singular	Plural	Gloss
1st	mìn	tìmì	I/we
2nd	sìn	nìmì	you/you all
3rd [+human]	ùmà	bìmà	he/she/they
3rd [-human]	nìma	ìma	it/they

==== Reciprocal pronouns ====
There is only one reciprocal pronoun, tͻb, in Konkomba.

Bὶ fè mànn tͻb fènnà.
3PL PST visit RECP yesterday
"They visited each other yesterday."

==== Reflexive pronouns ====
Reflexive pronouns are formed by the personal pronouns, to which the suffix -bà ('self') is attached to.

Personal pronoun	Suffix	Reflexive pronoun	Gloss
m/n	-bà	m-bà/n-bà	myself
à	-bà	à-bà	yourself
ù	-bà	ù-bà	himself/herself
tì	-bà	tì-bà	ourselves
bì	-bà	bì-bà	yourselves
ì	-bà	ì-bà	themselves [+human]
nì	-bà	nì-bà	themselves [-human]

==== Possessive pronouns ====
Possessive pronouns in Konkomba have the same morphological form than the preverbal personal pronouns. In special contexts, the prefix -aa can be attached to the possessum in order to emphasize the relation between the possessor and the possessum.

N do.
1SG house
"My house."

N’àà-do.
1SG-POSS-house
"My house."

==== Relative pronouns ====
Relative pronouns are dependent on the prefix of the noun that indicates its noun class. The relative pronoun is thus a reflection of the noun class and functions as a resumptive pronoun.

Ù-bò ù dàà lòòr nà.
NC-child REL buy car REL.DET
"The child who bought a car."

John dàà ì-gbéér ì dɔ dòò nà.
John buy NC-pig REL lie here REL.DET
"John bought pigs (that) are lying here."

==== Demonstrative pronouns ====
Demonstrative pronouns are formed by the noun class prefix of the particular noun and the suffix -mìnà. Konkomba makes a distinction between proximal and distal demonstratives.

	Singular	Plural	Gloss
Proximal	ùmìnà	ìmìnà	this/that
Proximal	nìmìnà	tìmìnà	this/that
Proximal	kìmìnà	mùmìnà	this/that
Distal	ùè	íè	these/those
Distal	nìè	nìè	these/those
Distal	kìè	mùè	these/those

== Syntax ==
=== Word order ===
Konkomba is a subject–verb–object language.

Adam fé tun fénna.
Adam HEST.PST work yesterday
"Adam worked yesterday."

Adam fé kɔr ukɔla fénna.
Adam HEST.PST slaughter fowl yesterday
"Adam slaughtered fowl yesterday."

Konja mèè Sam lè ki-gban din.
Konja beg.PST Sam FOC NC-book today
"Konja begged a booked from Sam."

=== Verb phrase ===
The VP consists of the main verb and preverbal particles encoding Tense, Aspect and Mood.

==== Preverbal particles ====
===== Aspectual particles =====
There is a distinction between perfective and imperfective aspect. The perfective is not explicitly marked, while the imperfective is expressed by the particle -bì.

Adelina ŋàr bù-sùb tààb.
Adelina sweep NC-tree under
"Adelina swept under the tree."

Adelina bì ŋàr bù-sùb tààb.
Adelina IPFV sweep NC-tree under
"Adelina is sweeping under the tree."

===== Tense particles =====
There are five distinct tense forms that are morphologically realized by an individual particle. Konkomba marks immediate past (bà), remote past (nàn), hesternal past (fè), future (gà) and negative future (ààn). The particles for the particular tense form also immediately precede the verb.

Naajo bà kùùr kì-sààk gbààn.
Naajo PST weed NC-farm DEF
"Naajo weeded the farm."

Naajo nàn kùùr kì-sààk gbààn.
Naajo PST weed NC-farm DEF
"Naajo weeded the farm."

Naajo fè kùùr kì-sààk gbààn.
Naajo HEST.PST weed NC-farm DEF
"Naajo weeded the farm."

Naajo gà kùùr kì-sààk gbààn.
Naajo FUT weed NC-farm DEF
"Naajo will weed the farm."

Naajo ààn kùùr kì-sààk gbààn.
Naajo NEG.FUT weed NC-farm DEF
"Naajo will not weed the farm."

==== Verb ====
Main verbs in Konkomba do not morphologically inflect, therefore there is no grammatical agreement.

=== Questions ===
There are different options how to form a question. The question word can either occur clause-initially, which is also referred to as ex situ, or it can stay in situ, meaning that it occurs at the end of the clause. Moreover, a question can also be embedded in a subordinated clause and a question can also have more than one question word.

Ba lè Konja mèè?
what FOC Konja beg.PST
"What did Konja beg for?"

Konja mèè ŋmà ki-gban?
Konja beg.PST who NC-book
"Who did Konja beg a book from?"

Ama bae ke bà John kɔr.
Ama ask.PST COMP what John slaughter.PFV
"Ama asked what John slaughtered."

Bà lè Konja mèè ŋmà?
what FOC Konja beg.PST who
"What did Konja beg from whom?"

== Sample text ==
The following is a sample portion of the Holy Bible translated into Konkomba, along with the corresponding passage in English:

"Yesu aah kan kinipaak ngbaan na, le u jon ligongoln paab, le ki kal. Le waadidiliib kuun u chee. Le u waar umɔb ki bui bi ke: 'Binib bi nyi ke bi ye bigiim Uwumbɔr wɔb na, waanyoor bi bi pu. Bima le yeh Uwumbɔr aanaan. Binib bi kpa mpombiin baatunwanbir pu na, Uwumbɔr aanyoor bi bi pu; u ga sɔŋ bisui. Binib bi sunn bibaa taab na, Uwumbɔr aanyoor bi bi pu. Bima le ga li yeh dulnyaa wee. Binib bi aanimbil man ke bi li ye bininyaam na, Uwumbɔr aanyoor bi bi pu. Binimbil ga gbiin. Binib bi kpa linimbaasaln na, Uwumbɔr aanyoor bi bi pu. U mu ga san bi kinimbaak. Binib bi dii Uwumbɔr ni bisui mɔmɔk na, waanyoor bi bi pu. Bima le ga kan uma Uwumbɔr. Binib bi par kijaak na, Uwumbɔr aanyoor bi bi pu. U ga len ke bi ye waabim. Binib bi ji falaa Uwumbɔr aasan aadiim pu na, waanyoor bi bi pu. Bima le yeh uma Uwumbɔr aanaan.'"

— Matiu 5:1–10 XONB

"And seeing the multitudes, He went up on a mountain, and when He was seated His disciples came to Him. Then He opened His mouth and taught them, saying: 'Blessed are the poor in spirit, For theirs is the kingdom of heaven. Blessed are those who mourn, for they shall be comforted. Blessed are the meek, for they shall inherit the earth. Blessed are those who hunger and thirst for righteousness, for they shall be filled. Blessed are the merciful, for they shall obtain mercy. Blessed are the pure in heart, for they shall see God. Blessed are the peacemakers, for they shall be called sons of God. Blessed are those who are persecuted for righteousness' sake, for theirs is the kingdom of heaven.'"

— Matthew 5:1–10 NKJV

== See also ==
- Konkomba people
- Languages of Ghana
