= Ngangam language =

Gur language spoken in Togo and Benin

Ngangam
- Gangam
- Native to: Togo, Benin
- Ethnicity: Gurma, Dye
- Native speakers: 200,000 (2012–2021)
- Language family: Niger–Congo?: Atlantic–Congo; Gur; Northern; Oti–Volta; Gurma; Ngangam

Official status
- Recognised minority language in: Benin

Language codes
- ISO 639-3: gng
- Glottolog: ngan1299

Ngangam or Dye (Gangam) is a language of the Gurma people spoken in Togo and Benin.

== Phonology ==
=== Consonants ===
Consonants
		Labial	Alveolar	Palatal	Velar	Labial- velar	Glottal
Plosive/Affricate	voiceless	p	t	t͡ʃ	k	kp	(ʔ)
Plosive/Affricate	voiced	b	d	d͡ʒ	g	gb	
Nasal		m	n	ɲ	ŋ	ŋm	
Fricative		f	s				(h)
Approximant			l	j		w	

- Reimer uses ⟨c, ɟ, y⟩ in place of /t͡ʃ, d͡ʒ, j/.
- /p, b, t, d, k/ are usually aspirated before close vowels.

=== Vowels ===
Vowels
	Front	Back
Close	i	u
Close-mid	e	o
Open-mid	ɛ	ɔ
Open	a	

- Ngangam has three vowel lengths—short, long weak, and long strong. The long weak vowels shorten in some cases, while the long strong vowels are always realized as long.

=== Tones ===
Ngangam has three phonemic tones: high, mid, and low.
