= Láwuyì Ògúnníran =

Nigerian playwright (1935-2020)

- Born: Ọláwuyì Mosọbalájé Ọ̀nàọpẹ́pọ̀ Àyìndé Owólábí Ògúnníran; November 5, 1935 Iroko, Oyo State, Nigeria
- Died: September 21, 2020 (aged 84)
- Language: Yorùbá
- Genre: plays

Láwuyì Ògúnníran (5 November 1935 – 21 September 2020) was a Nigerian playwright who authored several works in the Yoruba language. His play, Eégún Aláré, is a widely acclaimed work, and is a required text for Yorùbá literature classes in many Nigerian secondary schools.

Several academic papers have been dedicated to analysing different issues in his works, including a PhD thesis by Saudat Adebisi Hamzat at the University of Ilorin, entitled A New Historicist Analysis of Selected Plays of Lawuyi Ogunniran and Olu Owolabi. Durotoye Adeleke, a professor of Linguistics and African Languages at the University of Ibadan has also examined the topos of the 'Shakespearean Fool' in Ogunniran's work, alongside three other Yorùbá plays by Adébáyọ̀ Fálétí, Ọláńrewájú Adépọ̀jù and Afọlábí Ọlábímtán. Others have concentrated on exploring the poetics and oratory style that the dramatist deploys in his works.

== Publications ==
- Ààre-àgò Aríkùyerì
- Eégún Aláré
- Ọmọ Alátẹ Ìlẹ̀kẹ̀
- Ìbàdàn Mesìọ̀gọ̀: Kìnnìún ilẹ̀ Yorùbá (1829–1893)
- Ọlọ́run ò màwàda
- Àtàrí àjànàku
- Igi wọ́rọ́kọ́
- Nibo laye dori ko?
- Ọ̀nà kan ò wọjà
- Abínúẹni (coauthored with Yẹmí Ọmọ́táyọ̀)
- Ààrò Mẹ́ta Àtọ̀runwá!
- Ìṣe tí Àwọn Yorùbá Ńṣe
