= Konkomba people =

Ethnic group in Ghana

Bikpakpaam
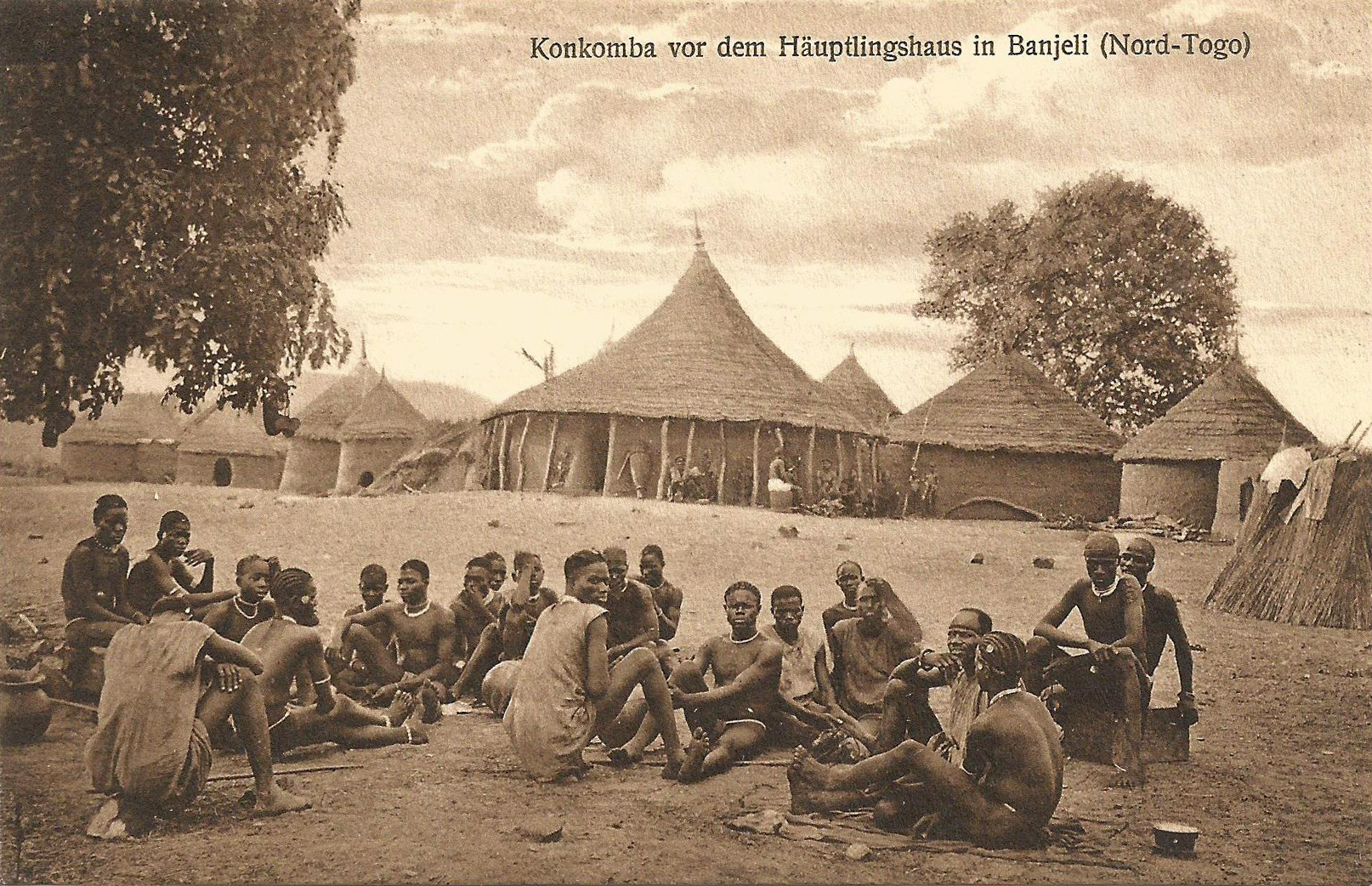
- Early-20th-century postcard

Total population
- 823,000 in Ghana and 122,209 in Togo

Regions with significant populations
- Ghana (Northern, Brong-Ahafo, Volta, Eastern and Greater Accra Regions) and Togo (Kara, Centrale and Plateaux Regions)

Languages
- Konkomba (Likpakpaani), French

Religion
- Traditional African religions (about 50%), Christianity (about 45%) and Islam (about 5%)

The Konkomba people are a Gur ethnic group in northern Ghana and north-west Togo, primarily in the area around the Oti River and the Volta and Northern Regions. They are the second-largest ethnic group in Ghana's Northern Region.

== Demography ==
According to the 2010 census, 823,000 Konkomba lived in Ghana. The CIA World Factbook reports that 3.5 percent of the country's population spoke the Konkomba language in 2010.

The Konkomba speak the Konkomba language, also known as Likpakpaanl. Until the turn of the 21st century, their primary occupation was farming and animal husbandry. The Konkomba are primarily subsistence farmers and raise poultry, small ruminants, and cattle.

== Ethnogenesis ==
The Konkomba refer to themselves as Bikpakpaam (plural form) and to their language as Likpakpaln. A male member of the tribe is an ukpakpaanja, and a female is an ukpakpaanpii. The anglicization "Konkomba" is commonly used to refer to the people and their language, native to northern Ghana. Before the 15th- and 16th-century arrival of other ethnic groups in northern Ghana, the Konkomba were settled in the area.

== Origin and history ==
The Konkomba settled in Ghana's eastern corridor before migrating elsewhere during the first half of the twentieth century due to colonial pressures and in search of fertile farmland. Borgu has been put forth as the place of origin of the Konkomba.

Oral tradition states that the Gonjas, under Ndewura Jakpa, defeated the Dagombas under Ya Na Dariziogo and compelled them to move their capital (believed to be Tamale) to its present site, Yendi. However, the Dagombas seem never to have closely controlled the Konkomba.

According to Martin (1976), the Dagombas pushed back the Konkomba and established divisional chiefs. The main towns were outposts, strategically located on the east bank of the River Oti. Relations between the Konkomba and the Dagombas were distant and hostile, with little or no intermarriage, but the Konkomba have insisted that they moved on voluntarily when the Dagombas arrived. David Tait quotes a Konkomba elder: "When we were growing up and met our fathers, they told us they (our forefathers) stayed in Yaan/Chare (Yendi) with the Kabre and Bikwom. The Dagombas at the time lived mainly in Tamale and Kumbungu from where they rose, mounted their horses and moved towards Yendi. We saw the horses and had to move further east."
