= Molybdenum cofactor guanylyltransferase =

Identifiers
- EC no.: 2.7.7.77

Databases
- IntEnz: IntEnz view
- BRENDA: BRENDA entry
- ExPASy: NiceZyme view
- KEGG: KEGG entry
- MetaCyc: metabolic pathway
- PRIAM: profile
- PDB structures: RCSB PDB PDBe PDBsum
Search
- PMC: articles
- PubMed: articles
- NCBI: proteins

Molybdenum cofactor guanylyltransferase (EC 2.7.7.77, MobA, MoCo guanylyltransferase) is an enzyme with systematic name GTP:molybdenum cofactor guanylyltransferase. This enzyme catalyses the following chemical reaction:

GTP + molybdenum cofactor $\rightleftharpoons$ diphosphate + guanylyl molybdenum cofactor

Catalyses the guanylation of the molybdenum cofactor.
