= Ghanaian braille =

Braille alphabets used in Ghana

Several braille alphabets are used in Ghana. For English, Unified English Braille has been adopted. Four other languages have been written in braille: Akan (Twi), Ga, Ewe, and Dagaare. All three alphabets are based on the basic braille letter values of basic Latin alphabet:

Basic braille alphabet
⠁ (braille pattern dots-1)	⠃ (braille pattern dots-12)	⠉ (braille pattern dots-14)	⠙ (braille pattern dots-145)	⠑ (braille pattern dots-15)	⠋ (braille pattern dots-124)	⠛ (braille pattern dots-1245)	⠓ (braille pattern dots-125)	⠊ (braille pattern dots-24)	⠚ (braille pattern dots-245)	⠅ (braille pattern dots-13)	⠇ (braille pattern dots-123)	⠍ (braille pattern dots-134)
a	b	c	d	e	f	g	h	i	j	k	l	m
⠝ (braille pattern dots-1345)	⠕ (braille pattern dots-135)	⠏ (braille pattern dots-1234)	⠟ (braille pattern dots-12345)	⠗ (braille pattern dots-1235)	⠎ (braille pattern dots-234)	⠞ (braille pattern dots-2345)	⠥ (braille pattern dots-136)	⠧ (braille pattern dots-1236)	⠺ (braille pattern dots-2456)	⠭ (braille pattern dots-1346)	⠽ (braille pattern dots-13456)	⠵ (braille pattern dots-1356)
n	o	p	q	r	s	t	u	v	w	x	y	z

The braille equivalents of print letters beyond these are described below. English Braille punctuation is used in both Ghana and (according to UNESCO 2013) Togo.

Braille is not in active use in Ghana for any language but English. However, there are some older publications in these braille alphabets.

== Akan (Twi) Braille ==
Twi Braille Akan Braille
- Script type: alphabet
- Languages: Twi

Related scripts
- Parent systems: Braille: English Braille; Twi Braille

Akan has two extra vowel letters. ⠪ ɔ could be expected from international/African norms; ⠻ ɛ is specific to Ghana.

ɔ	ɛ

== Ga and Dagaare Braille ==
Ga Braille Dagaare Braille
- Script type: alphabet
- Languages: Ga, Dagaare

Related scripts
- Parent systems: Braille: English Braille; Ga Braille

Ga and Dagaare add a third extra letter, ⠬ ŋ.

ɔ	ɛ	ŋ

== Ewe Braille ==
Ewe Braille
- Script type: alphabet
- Languages: Ewe

Related scripts
- Parent systems: Braille: English Braille; Ewe Braille

Ewe adds several additional consonants: ⠫ ɖ, ⠹ ƒ, ⠣ ɣ, ⠮ ʋ.

ɔ	ɛ	ŋ	ɖ	ƒ	ɣ	ʋ

The ɖ and ɣ are the international/African norm (see also Nigerian braille); ƒ and ʋ are from the English th sounds, the closest approximation in that language after f and v.

== Braille for Togolese languages ==
Ewe is the primary language of Togo, and is evidently used in Togo with the same braille assignments as in Ghana. UNESCO (2013 [1990]) reports several additional Togolese alphabets it was unable to confirm, but which were designed in conjunction with the Ghanaian languages; they evidently use the Ghanaian Ewe assignments:

- Bassar and Konkomba are written in basic braille plus Ewe ŋ, ɔ.
- Kabiye has ɖ ɛ ɣ ɩ ŋ ɔ ʊ. The letters ɩ and ʊ follows international norms, and are equivalent to ⠔ ị and ⠳ ụ in Igbo Braille. (Unesco reports u/ʊ braille values are exchanged from the norm, a likely copy error.) The other letters are as in Ewe.
- Moba has ɛ ɩ ŋ ɔ, with ⠔ ɩ as in Kabiye.
- Tem has ɖ ɛ ɩ ŋ ɔ υ, as in Kabiye.

In addition, UNESCO reports that various Togolese languages have ⠡ for nasal vowels, ⠸ for high tone, ⠘ for mid tone, and ⠰ for low tone.

All five of these languages are spoken in Ghana as well as Togo, but Unesco does not report on them being reduced to braille there.
