= Yoruba language =

Atlantic-Congo language

Yoruba
- Èdè Yorùbá
- Pronunciation: [èdè jōɾùbá]
- Native to: Benin · Nigeria · Togo
- Region: Yorubaland
- Ethnicity: Yoruba
- Speakers: L1: 48 million (2023); L2: 2.0 million (no date); Total: 50 million (2023)
- Language family: Niger–Congo?: Atlantic–Congo; Volta-Congo; Volta–Niger; Yoruboid; Edekiri; Yoruba
- Early form: Proto-Yoruboid
- Dialects: Lucumí
- Writing system: Latin (Yoruba alphabet); Arabic (Anjemi); Oduduwa script; Yoruba Braille
- Signed forms: Signed Yoruba

Official status
- Official language in: Nigeria (national status)
- Recognised minority language in: Benin; Togo

Language codes
- ISO 639-1: yo
- ISO 639-2: yor
- ISO 639-3: yor
- Glottolog: yoru1245
- Linguasphere: 98-AAA-a

- Person: Ọmọ Yorùbá
- People: Ìran Yorùbá
- Language: Èdè Yorùbá
- Country: Ilẹ̀ Yorùbá

Yoruba (/ˈjɒrʊbə/; Yor. Èdè Yorùbá [èdè jōɾùbá]) is an Atlantic–Congo language that is spoken in West Africa, primarily in South West Nigeria, Benin, and parts of Togo. It is spoken by the Yoruba people. Yoruba speakers number roughly 50 million, including around 2 million second-language or L2 speakers. As a pluricentric language, it is primarily spoken in a dialectal area spanning Nigeria, Benin, and Togo with smaller migrated communities in Côte d'Ivoire, Sierra Leone and Gambia.

Yoruba vocabulary is also used in African diaspora religions such as the Afro-Brazilian religions of Candomblé and Umbanda, the Caribbean religion of Santería in the form of the liturgical Lucumí language, and various Afro-American religions of North America. Among modern practitioners of these religions in the Americas, Yorùbá-derived lexicon is used as a liturgical language, as almost all practitioners of these Diaspora manifestations are not fluent in it, yet they still use Yorùbá words and phrases for songs or chants, which are rooted in cultural traditions. For such practitioners, the Yorùbá-derived lexicon is especially common for ritual purposes, and these modern manifestations have taken new forms that do not depend on vernacular fluency.

As the principal Yoruboid language, Yoruba is most closely related to Itsekiri (spoken in the Niger Delta) and Igala (spoken in central Nigeria).

== History ==
Yoruba is classified among the Edekiri languages, which together with Itsekiri and the isolate Igala form the Yoruboid group of languages within the Volta–Niger branch of the Niger–Congo family. The linguistic unity of the Niger–Congo family dates to deep pre-history, with estimates ranging around 11,000 years ago (the end of the Upper Paleolithic). In present-day Nigeria, it is estimated that there are around 50 million Yoruba primary and secondary language speakers, as well as several other millions of speakers outside Nigeria, making it the most widely spoken African language outside of the continent. There is a substantial body of literature in the Yoruba language, including books, newspapers, and pamphlets. Yoruba is used in radio and television broadcasting and is taught at primary, secondary, and tertiary levels. Historically, Yoruba was spoken by many slaves trafficked to the Americas, particularly Latin America, during the latter period of the Atlantic slave trade.

== Varieties ==
The Yoruba dialect continuum consists of multiple dialects. The various Yoruba dialects in Yorubaland can be classified into five major dialect areas: Northwest, Northeast, Central, Southwest, and Southeast. (Note: This widely followed classification is based on Adetugbọ's 1982 dialectological study; this classification originated in his 1967 PhD thesis The Yoruba Language in Western Nigeria: Its Major Dialect Areas, ProQuest 288034744. See also Adetugbọ 1973, pp. 183–193.) Clear boundaries cannot be drawn, but peripheral areas of dialectal regions often have some similarities to adjoining dialects.

=== North-West Yoruba (NWY) ===
North-West Yoruba was historically spoken in the Ọyọ Empire. In NWY dialects, the Proto-Yoruba velar fricative [ ɣ ] (gh) and labialized voiced velar [ gʷ ] (gw) have both merged into [w]; the upper vowels [ɪ] and [ʊ] were raised and merged with [i] and [u], just as their nasal counterparts, resulting in a vowel system with seven oral and three nasal vowels. Negation is typical expressed with {Ko}, continuative aspect with {N}, and the indefinite tense with {yio} and {a}. The two sibilant sounds [s] and [ ʃ ] (sh/ṣ) are usually confused, except in the Abeokuta area among the Egba.

NWY dialects cover the following varieties, peoples, and places: Egba, Ibadan, Ọyọ, Lagos (Eko), Onko, and Ibarapa. Samples:

Egba dialect

Onko dialect, Okeho

Shaki dialect

Oyo dialect from Iwo

=== Central Yoruba ===
Central Yoruba forms a transitional area combining features from both sides, in that the lexicon has much in common with NWY and it shares the ethnographical features with SEY. It is however unique in its own right on other aspects. It polarizes negativeness and positiveness in its short singular pronouns. It also maintains an extensive vowel harmony system in which the occurrence of vowels in successive syllables is determined by features of laxness or tenseness. Its vowel system is also the most traditional of the three dialect groups, retaining nine oral-vowel contrasts, six or seven nasal vowels. Peculiar to Central (CY) and Eastern (NEY, SEY) Yoruba also is the ability to begin words with the vowel [ʊ:], which in Western Yoruba has been innovatively changed to [ɪ:].

Central Yoruba dialects cover the following varieties, peoples, and places: Igbomina, Ijesha, Ifẹ, Ekiti (including Akurẹ), Ẹfọn, and Western Akoko. Samples:

Ekiti dialect

Ifẹ dialect

Ijesha dialect

Ekiti from Irun Akoko

=== South-East Yoruba (SEY) ===
The area of the South-East Yoruba dialects was for long periods associated with the expansion of the Great Benin Empire after c. 1450. In contrast to NWY, lineage and descent are largely multilineal and cognatic, traditional government operated through a system of graded societies, and the division of titles into martial and civil is unknown. Linguistically, SEY is more conservative (less innovating) that NWY and has therefore retained the [ ɣ ] (gh) and [ gʷ ] (gw) contrast, while it has lowered the nasal vowels [ĩ] and [ʊ̃] to [ɛ̃] and [ɔ̃], respectively, i.e 'Irin' (iron) becomes 'Urẹn' and 'Ọ̀run' (heaven) becomes 'Ọ̀rọn'. Negation and tense-aspect distinctions are made by pronoun vowel change. i.e Mo wá (I came) becomes; Méè wá (I didn't come).

In SEY no distinction exists between the second and third-person plural pronominal forms; thus, 'àn án wá' can mean either 'you (pl.) came' or 'they came' in SEY dialects, whereas NWY has 'ẹ wá'; 'you (pl.) came' and 'wọ́n wá'; 'they came', respectively. The innovative emergence of a plural of respect may have prevented the fusion of the two forms in the NWY dialects.

SEY covers the following dialects, places, and peoples: Ondo, Ọwọ, Remo, Ijẹbu, Ikale, Eastern Akoko (Akoko, Ào), Ilaje, and Usẹn. Samples:

Owo dialect

Idanre dialect

Ijebu dialect

Ikale dialect

Ao dialect, Ifira

=== Others ===
North-East Yoruba (NEY) includes varieties of Yoruba that cover the following languages, peoples, and places: Yagba, Owe, Ikiri, Ijumu, Oworo, Gbede, Abunu, Okun. South-West Yoruba (SWY) cover the following languages, peoples, and places: Ketu, Awori, Sakété, Ifè (Togo), Idasha, and Anago.

== Literary Yoruba ==
A Yoruba speaker, recorded in South Africa

Literary Yoruba, also known as Standard Yoruba, Yoruba Koiné, and Common Yoruba, is a separate member of the dialect cluster. It is the written form of the language, the standard variety learned at school, and that is spoken by newsreaders on the radio. Standard Yoruba has its origin in the 1850s, when Samuel A. Crowther, the first native African Anglican bishop, published a Yoruba grammar and started his translation of the Bible. Though for a large part based on the Ọyọ and Ibadan dialects, Standard Yoruba incorporates several features from other dialects. (Note: Compare for example the following remark by Adetugbọ 1967, as cited in Fagborun 1994, p. 25: "While the orthography agreed upon by the missionaries represented to a very large degree the phonemes of the Abẹokuta dialect, the morpho-syntax reflected the Ọyọ-Ibadan dialects.") It also has some features peculiar to itself, for example, the simplified vowel harmony system, as well as foreign structures, such as calques from English that originated in early translations of religious works.

Because the use of Standard Yoruba did not result from some deliberate linguistic policy, much controversy exists as to what constitutes 'genuine Yoruba', with some writers holding the opinion that the Ọyọ dialect is the "pure" form, and others stating that there is no such thing as genuine Yoruba at all. Standard Yoruba, the variety learned at school and used in the media, has nonetheless been a decisive consolidating factor in the emergence of a common Yoruba identity.

== Phonology ==
The syllable structure of Yoruba is (C)V(N). Syllabic nasals are also possible. Every syllable bears one of the three tones: high ⟨◌́⟩, mid ⟨◌̄⟩ (generally left unmarked), and low ⟨◌̀⟩. The sentence n̄ ò lọ (I didn't go) provides examples of three syllable types:

- n̄ — [ŋ̄] — I
- ò — [ò] — not (negation)
- lọ — [lɔ̄] — to go

=== Vowels ===
Yoruba vowel diagram, adopted from Bamgboṣe 1969. Black dots mark oral vowels, while the colored regions indicate the ranges in possible quality of the nasal vowels.

Standard Yoruba has seven oral and five nasal vowels. There are no diphthongs in Yoruba; sequences of vowels are pronounced as separate syllables. Dialects differ in the number of vowels they have; see above.

	Oral vowels		Nasal vowels	
	Front	Back	Front	Back
Close	i	u	ĩ	ũ
Close-mid	e	o		
Open-mid	ɛ	ɔ	(ɛ̃)	(ɔ̃)
Open	a		ã	

- In some cases, the phonetic realization of these vowels is noticeably different from what the symbol suggests:
  - The oral /i/ is close front [i], and the nasal /ĩ/ varies between close front [ĩ] and near-close front [ĩ̞].
  - The oral /u/ is close back [u], and the nasal /ũ/ varies between close near-back [ũ̟], close back [ũ], near-close near-back [ũ̟˕] and near-close back [ũ̞].
  - The oral /e, o/ are close-mid [e, o], and do not have nasal counterparts.
  - The oral /ɛ/ is open-mid [ɛ], and the nasal /ɛ̃/ varies between mid [ɛ̝̃] and open-mid [ɛ̃].
  - The oral /ɔ/ is near-open [ɔ̞], and the nasal /ɔ̃/ varies between open-mid [ɔ̃] and near-open [ɒ̃].
  - The oral /a/ is central [ä].

Nasal vowels are by default written as a vowel letter followed by ⟨n⟩, thus: ⟨in⟩, ⟨un⟩, ⟨ẹn⟩, ⟨ọn⟩, ⟨an⟩. These do not occur word-initially. Phonemically, the standard language only has 3 nasal vowels /ã ĩ ũ/. [ɛ̃] is only used in the word ìyẹn~yẹn [(ì.)jɛ̃] ‘thatʼ, an SEY word borrowed into the standard language which is slowly gaining traction over the traditional word, èniyì /è.lĩ̄.jì/ [è.nĩ̄.jì]. [ɔ̃] is how /ã/ is pronounced after labial consonants, an allophony represented within the orthography (Compare ìbọn [ì.bɔ̃̄] ‘gun’, spelled with ⟨ọn⟩ and pronounced with a rounded [ɔ̃] vs. dán [dã~dɔ̃] ‘to shineʼ, spelled with ⟨an⟩ and pronounced with an unrounded [ã]). Some speakers pronounce all instances of /ã/ as [ɔ̃], due to the lack of a meaningful phonemic difference between the two in the standard dialect. All vowels are nasalized after the consonant /m/, and thus there is no additional ⟨n⟩ in writing (mi, mu, mọ). In addition, the consonant /l/ has a nasal allophone [n] before a nasal vowel (see below), and this is reflected in writing: inú ("inside, belly") (/īlṹ/ → [īnṹ]). (Note: Abraham, in his Dictionary of Modern Yoruba, deviates from this by explicitly indicating the nasality of the vowel; thus, inú is found under inún, etc.)

=== Consonants ===
	Labial	Alveolar	Post-alv./ Palatal	Velar		Glottal
	Labial	Alveolar	Post-alv./ Palatal	plain	labial	Glottal
Stop	b	t d	ɟ	k ɡ	k͡p ɡ͡b	
Fricative	f	s	ʃ			h
Approximant/Nasal	m	l ~ n	j	ŋ ~ ŋ̍	w	
Rhotic		ɾ				

The voiceless plosives /t/ and /k/ are slightly aspirated; in some Yoruba varieties, /t/ and /d/ are more dental. The rhotic consonant is realized as a flap [ɾ] or, in some varieties (notably Lagos Yoruba), as the alveolar approximant [ɹ] due to English influence. This is particularly common with Yoruba–English bilinguals.

Like many other languages of the region, Yoruba has the voiceless and voiced labial–velar stops /k͡p/ and /ɡ͡b/: pápá [k͡pák͡pá] 'field', gbogbo [ɡ͡bōɡ͡bō] 'all'. Notably, in Nigeria it lacks a voiceless bilabial stop /p/, apart from phonaesthesia, such as [pĩpĩ] for vehicle horn sounds, and marginal segments found in recent loanwords, such as <pẹ́ńsù> [k͡pɛ́ńsù~pɛ́ńsù] for "pencil".

Yoruba also lacks a phoneme /n/; the letter ⟨n⟩ is used for the sound in the orthography, but strictly speaking, it refers to an allophone of /l/ immediately preceding a nasal vowel.

In addition to this, Yoruba lacks the breathy h that one might find in English words like house or hat. When speaking most people will add a glottal stop, /ʔ/, an approximant like /ɰ/, or just leave it silent.

There is also a syllabic nasal, which forms a syllable nucleus by itself. When it precedes a vowel, it is a velar nasal [ŋ]: n ò lọ [ŋ ò lɔ̄] 'I didn't go'. In other cases, its place of articulation is homorganic with the following consonant: ó ń lọ [ó ń lɔ̄] 'he is going', ó ń fò [ó ḿ fò] 'he is jumping'.

=== Tone ===
Yoruba is a tonal language with three-level tones and two or three contour tones. Every syllable must have at least one tone; a syllable containing a long vowel can have two tones. Tones are marked by use of the acute accent for high tone (⟨á⟩, ⟨ń⟩) and the grave accent for low tone (⟨à⟩, ⟨ǹ⟩); mid is unmarked, except on syllabic nasals where it is indicated using a macron (⟨a⟩, ⟨n̄⟩). Examples:

- H: ó bẹ́ [ó bɛ́] 'he jumped'; síbí [síbí] 'spoon'
- M: ó bẹ [ó bɛ̄] 'he is forward'; ara [āɾā] 'body'
- L: ó bẹ̀ [ó bɛ̀] 'he asks for pardon'; ọ̀kọ̀ [ɔ̀kɔ̀] 'spear'.

When teaching Yoruba literacy, solfège names of musical notes are used to name the tones: low is do, mid is re, and high is mi.

=== Whistled Yoruba ===
A greeting in whistled Yoruba
ará iwájú, ɛ kú iʃɛ́ o "people who arrived before me, greetings at work"

Apart from tone's lexical and grammatical use, it is also used in other contexts such as whistling and drumming. Whistled Yoruba is used to communicate over long distances. The language is transformed as speakers talk and whistle simultaneously: consonants are devoiced or turned to [h], and all vowels are changed to [u]. However, all tones are retained without any alteration. The retention of tones enables speakers to understand the meaning of the whistled language. The Yoruba talking drum, the dùndún or iya ilu, which accompanies singing during festivals and important ceremonies, also uses tone.

=== Tonality effects and computer-coded documents ===
Written Yoruba includes diacritical marks not available on conventional computer keyboards, requiring some adaptations. In particular, the use of the sub dots and tone marks are not represented, so many Yoruba documents simply omit them. Asubiaro Toluwase, in his 2014 paper, points out that the use of these diacritics can affect the retrieval of Yoruba documents by popular search engines. Therefore, their omission can have a significant impact on online research.

==== Assimilation and elision ====
When a word precedes another word beginning with a vowel, assimilation, or deletion ('elision') of one of the vowels often takes place. Since syllables in Yoruba normally end in a vowel, and most nouns start with one, it is a widespread phenomenon, and it is absent only in slow, unnatural speech. The orthography here follows speech in that word divisions are normally not indicated in words that are contracted due to assimilation or elision: ra ẹja → rẹja 'buy fish'. Sometimes, however, authors may choose to use an inverted comma to indicate an elided vowel as in ní ilé → n'ílé 'in the house'.

Long vowels within words usually signal that a consonant has been elided word-internally. In such cases, the tone of the elided vowel is retained: àdìrò → ààrò 'hearth'; koríko → koóko 'grass'; òtító → òótó 'truth'.

== Writing systems ==
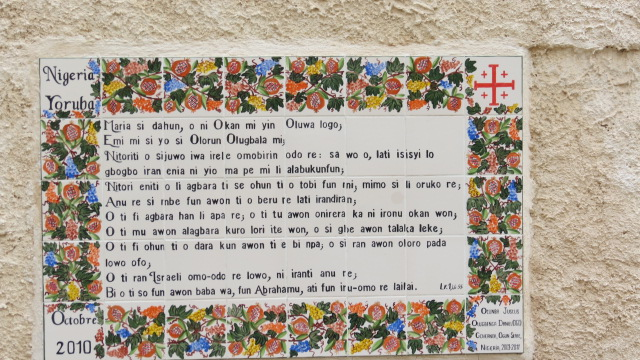
Yoruba hymn, Church of the Visitation, Jerusalem

The earliest evidence of the presence of Islam in Yorubaland goes back to the 14th century. The earliest documented history of the people, traced to the latter part of the 17th century, was in Yoruba but in the Arabic script called Ajami. This makes Yoruba one of the oldest African languages with an attested history of Ajami (Cf. Mumin & Versteegh 2014; Hofheinz 2018). However, the oldest extant Yoruba Ajami exemplar is a 19th-century Islamic verse (waka) by Badamasi Agbaji (d. 1895– Hunwick 1995). There are several items of Yoruba Ajami in poetry, personal notes, and esoteric knowledge (Cf. Bang 2019). Nevertheless, Yoruba Ajami remained idiosyncratic and not socially diffused, as no standardized orthography existed. The plethora of dialects and the absence of a central promotional institution, among others, are responsible.

In the 17th century, Yoruba was written in the Ajami script, a form of Arabic script. It is still written in the Ajami writing script in some Islamic circles. Standard Yoruba orthography originated in the early work of Church Mission Society missionaries working among the Aku (Yoruba) of Freetown. One of their informants was Crowther, who later would proceed to work on his native language himself. In early grammar primers and translations of portions of the English Bible, Crowther used the Latin alphabet largely without tone markings. The only diacritic used was a dot below certain vowels to signify their open variants [ɛ] and [ɔ], viz. ⟨ẹ⟩ and ⟨ọ⟩. Over the years, the orthography was revised to represent tone, among other things. In 1875, the Church Missionary Society (CMS) organized a conference on Yoruba Orthography; the standard devised there was the basis for the orthography of the steady flow of religious and educational literature over the next seventy years.

The current orthography of Yoruba derives from a 1966 report of the Yoruba Orthography Committee, along with Ayọ Bamgboṣe's 1965 Yoruba Orthography, a study of the earlier orthographies and an attempt to bring Yoruba orthography in line with actual speech as much as possible. Still similar to the older orthography, it employs the Latin alphabet modified by the use of the digraph ⟨gb⟩ and certain diacritics, including the underdots under the letters ⟨ẹ⟩, ⟨ọ⟩, and ⟨ṣ⟩. Previously, the vertical line had been used to avoid the mark being fully covered by an underline, as in ⟨e̩⟩, ⟨o̩⟩, ⟨s̩⟩; however, that usage is no longer common.

Yoruba alphabet (Nigeria)
Upper case	A	B	D	E	Ẹ	F	G	Gb	H	I	J	K	L	M	N	O	Ọ	P	R	S	Ṣ	T	U	W	Y
Lower case	a	b	d	e	ẹ	f	g	gb	h	i	j	k	l	m	n	o	ọ	p	r	s	ṣ	t	u	w	y
IPA	a	b	d	e	ɛ	f	g	ɡ͡b	h	i	d͡ʒ	k	l	m	n, ŋ̍, ̃	o	ɔ	k͡p, p	ɾ	s	ʃ	t	u	w, ʷ	j

The Latin letters ⟨c⟩, ⟨q⟩, ⟨v⟩, ⟨x⟩, ⟨z⟩ are not used as part of the official orthography of Standard Yoruba and only occur in loan words from English. However, ⟨z⟩ is used in certain Yoruba dialects, like the Ao dialect.

The pronunciation of the letters without diacritics corresponds more or less to their International Phonetic Alphabet equivalents, except for the labial–velar consonant [k͡p] (written ⟨p⟩) and [ɡ͡b] (written ⟨gb⟩), in which both consonants are pronounced simultaneously rather than sequentially. The diacritic underneath vowels indicates an open vowel, pronounced with the root of the tongue retracted (so ⟨ẹ⟩ is pronounced [ɛ̙] and ⟨ọ⟩ is [ɔ̙]). ⟨ṣ⟩ represents a postalveolar consonant [ʃ] like the English ⟨sh⟩, ⟨y⟩ represents a palatal approximant like English ⟨y⟩, and ⟨j⟩ a voiced palatal stop [ɟ], as is common in many African orthographies.

In addition to the underdots, three further diacritics are used on vowels and syllabic nasal consonants to indicate the language's tones: an acute accent ⟨´⟩ for the high tone, a grave accent ⟨`⟩ for the low tone, and an optional macron ⟨¯⟩ for the middle tone. These are used in addition to the underdots in ⟨ẹ⟩ and ⟨ọ⟩. When more than one tone is used in one syllable, the vowel can either be written once for each tone (for example, *⟨òó⟩ for a vowel [o] with tone rising from low to high) or, more rarely in current usage, combined into a single accent. In this case, a caron ⟨ˇ⟩ is used for the rising tone (so the previous example would be written ⟨ǒ⟩), and a circumflex ⟨ˆ⟩ for the falling tone.

Á	À	Ā	É	È	Ē	Ẹ	Ẹ́	Ẹ̀	Ẹ̄	Í	Ì	Ī	Ń	Ǹ	N̄	Ḿ	M̀	M̄	Ó	Ò	Ō	Ọ	Ọ́	Ọ̀	Ọ̄	Ú	Ù	Ū	Ṣ
á	à	ā	é	è	ē	ẹ	ẹ́	ẹ̀	ẹ̄	í	ì	ī	ń	ǹ	n̄	ḿ	m̀	m̄	ó	ò	ō	ọ	ọ́	ọ̀	ọ̄	ú	ù	ū	ṣ

In Benin, Yoruba uses a different orthography. The Yoruba alphabet was standardized along with other Benin languages in the National Languages Alphabet by the National Language Commission in 1975, and revised in 1990 and 2008 by the National Center for Applied Linguistics.

Benin alphabet
A	B	D	E	Ɛ	F	G	Gb	H	I	J	K	Kp	L	M	N	O	Ɔ	P	R	S	Sh	T	U	V	W	X	Y	Z
a	b	d	e	ɛ	f	g	gb	h	i	j	k	kp	l	m	n	o	ɔ	p	r	s	sh	t	u	v	w	x	y	z

In 2011, a Beninese priest-chief by the name of Tolúlàṣẹ Ògúntósìn devised a new script for Yoruba, based on a vision received in his sleep which he believed to have been granted by Oduduwa. This Oduduwa script has also received support from other prominent chiefs in the Yorubaland region of both countries.

== Grammar ==
Yoruba is a highly isolating language. Its basic constituent order is subject–verb–object, as in ó nà Adé ("he beat Adé"). The bare verb stem denotes a completed action, often called perfect; tense and aspect are marked by preverbal particles such as ń (imperfect/present continuous) or ti (past). Negation is expressed by a preverbal particle kò. Serial verb constructions are common, as in many other languages of West Africa.

Although Yoruba has no grammatical gender, it has a distinction between human and non-human nouns when it comes to interrogative particles: ta ni for human nouns ("who?") and kí ni for non-human nouns ("what?"). The associative construction (covering possessive/genitive and related notions) consists of juxtaposing nouns in the order modified-modifier as in inú àpótí ("inside box", "the inside of the box"), fìlà Àkàndé ("Akande's cap") or àpótí aṣọ ("box for clothes"). More than two nouns can be juxtaposed: rélùweè abẹ́ ilẹ̀ ("railway underground", "underground railway"), inú àpótí aṣọ ("the inside of the clothes box"). Disambiguation is left to context in the rare case that it results in two possible readings. Plural nouns are indicated by a plural word.

There are two prepositions: ní ("on", "at", "in") and sí ("onto", "towards"). The former indicates location and absence of movement, and the latter encodes location/direction with movement. Position and direction are expressed by the prepositions in combination with spatial relational nouns like orí ("top"), apá ("side"), inú ("inside"), etí ("edge"), abẹ́ ("under"), ilẹ̀ ("down"), etc. Many of the spatial relational terms are historically related to body-part terms.

== Vocabulary ==
=== Roots ===
Most verbal roots are monosyllabic of the phonological shape CV(N), for example: dá 'to create', dán 'to polish', pọ́n 'to be red'. Verbal roots that do not seem to follow this pattern are mostly former compounds in which a syllable has been elided. For example: nlá 'to be large', originally a compound of ní 'to have' + lá 'to be big' and súfèé 'to whistle', originally a compound of sú 'to eject wind' + òfé or ìfé 'a blowing'. Vowels serve as nominalizing prefixes that turn a verb into a noun form.

Nominal roots are mostly disyllabic, for example: abà 'crib, barn', ara 'body', ibà 'fever'. Monosyllabic and even trisyllabic roots do occur but they are less common.

=== Arabic influence ===
The wide adoption of imported religions and civilizations such as Islam and Christianity has had an impact both on written and spoken Yoruba. In his Arabic-English Encyclopedic Dictionary of the Quran and Sunnah, Yoruba Muslim scholar Abu-Abdullah Adelabu argued Islam has enriched African languages by providing them with technical and cultural augmentations with Swahili and Somali in East Africa and Turanci Hausa and Wolof in West Africa being the primary beneficiaries. Adelabu, a Ph D graduate from Damascus cited—among many other common usages—the following words to be Yoruba's derivatives of Arabic vocabularies:

==== Some loanwords ====
- Sanma: Heaven or sky, from السماء as-samā’
- Alubarika: blessing, from البركة al-barakah
- Alumaani: wealth, money, resources, from المال al-māl
- Amin: Arabic form of the Hebrew religious term Amen, from آمین āmīn

Some common Arabic words used in Yoruba are names of the days such as Atalata (الثلاثاء) for Tuesday, Alaruba (الأربعاء) for Wednesday, Alamisi (الخميس) for Thursday, and Jimoh (الجمعة, Jumu'ah) for Friday. By far, Ọjọ́ Jimoh is the most favourably used. This is because eti, the Yoruba word for Friday, means 'delay'. This is an unpleasant word for Friday, Ẹtì, which also implies failure, laziness, or abandonment. Ultimately, the standard words for the days of the week are Àìkú, Ajé, Ìṣẹ́gun, Ọjọ́rú, Ọjọ́bọ, Ẹtì, Àbámẹ́ta, for Sunday, Monday, Tuesday, Wednesday, Thursday, Friday, Saturday respectively. Friday remains Eti in the Yoruba language.

== Numerals ==
Yoruba uses a vigesimal (base-20) numbering system.

- Oókàn, 1, is a basic numeric block.
- Ẹ̀jì = 2.
- Ẹ̀tà = 3.
- Ẹ̀rin = 4.
- Àrún = 5.
- Ẹ̀fá = 6.
- Èjé = 7.
- Ẹ̀jọ́ = 8.
- Ẹ̀sán = 9.
- Ẹ̀wá = 10.
- Ogún = 20.
- Ogójì, 40, (Ogún-méjì) = 20 multiplied by 2 (èjì).
- Ọgọ́ta, 60, (Ogún-mẹ́ta) = 20 multiplied by 3 (ẹ̀ta).
- Ọgọ́rin, 80, (Ogún-mẹ́rin) = 20 multiplied by 4 (ẹ̀rin).
- Ọgọ́rùn-ún, 100, (Ogún-márùn-ún) = 20 multiplied by 5 (àrún).
- – 16 (Ẹẹ́rìndínlógún) = 4 less than 20.
- – 17 (Ẹẹ́tàdínlógún) = 3 less than 20.
- – 18 (Eéjìdínlógún) = 2 less than 20.
- – 19 (Oókàndínlógún) = 1 less than 20.
- – 21 (Oókànlélógún) = 1 increment on 20.
- – 22 (Eéjìlélógún) = 2 increment on 20.
- – 23 (Ẹẹ́tàlélógún) = 3 increment on 20.
- – 24 (Ẹẹ́rìnlélógún) = 4 increment on 20.
- – 25 (Aárùnlélógún) = 5 increment on 20.
- – 30 (Ogbòn) = 10 increment on 20.
- -50 (Aadota) = 10 less than 60.

== Literature ==
=== Spoken literature ===
•Odu Ifa, •Oriki, •Ewi, •Esa, •Àlọ́, •Rara, •Iremoje, •Bolojo, •Ijala, •Ajangbode, •Ijeke, Alámọ̀

=== Written literature ===
- Samuel Ajayi Crowther
- Wande Abimbola
- Reverend Samuel Johnson
- Yemi Elebuibon
- Femi Osofisan
- Daniel Olorunfemi Fagunwa
- Adebayo Faleti
- Akinwunmi Isola
- Obo Aba Hisanjani
- Duro Ladipo
- J.F. Odunjo
- Afolabi Olabimtan
- Wole Soyinka
- Amos Tutuola
- Lawuyi Ogunniran
- Kola Tubosun

As of 2024, the Yoruba Wikipedia is the most visited website in Yoruba.

== Music ==
- Ibeyi, a Cuban francophone twin-sister duo, often sing in Lucumí, a liturgical variety of Yoruba used in Santería.
- Sakara, a Yoruba song originating from Abeokuta, Ogun, Nigeria. One of the first performers of this type of music was in Lagos in the 1930s.
- Apala, (or Akpala) is a percussion-based music genre originally developed by the Yoruba people of Nigeria during the country's history as a colony of the British Empire. It originated in the late 1970s.
- Fuji is a popular, contemporary Yoruba musical genre.
- Jùjú is a style of Nigerian popular music derived from traditional Yoruba percussion.
- Àpíìrì is a popular music genre common among Ido and Igbole Ekiti environs of Ekiti State. The musical instruments usually consist of beaded calabash gourds and gongs supported with harmonic lyrics.
- Fela Kuti was a famous activist and musician who was the principal creator of the Afrobeat genre.

== Sample text ==
Article 1 of the Universal Declaration of Human Rights in Yoruba:

Gbogbo ènìyàn ni a bí ní òmìnira; iyì àti ẹ̀tọ́ kọ̀ọ̀kan sì dọ́gba. Wọ́n ní ẹ̀bùn ti làákàyè àti ti ẹ̀rí-ọkàn, ó sì yẹ kí wọn ó máa hùwà sí ara wọn gẹ́gẹ́ bí ọmọ ìyá.

Article 1 of the Universal Declaration of Human Rights in English:

All human beings are born free and equal in dignity and rights. They are endowed with reason and conscience and should act towards one another in a spirit of brotherhood.

== See also ==
- Yoruba numerals
