= Yoruba alphabet =

Latin-script alphabet used to write the Yorùbá language

Yoruba
- Script type: Alphabet ic
- Period: 1965–present
- Languages: Yoruba

Related scripts
- Parent systems: Latin alphabet: Yoruba

ISO 15924
- ISO 15924: Latn (215), Latin

Unicode
- Unicode alias: Latin

The Yoruba alphabet (Yoruba: Álífábẹ́ẹ̀tì Yorùbá) is either of two Latin alphabets used to write the Yoruba language, one in Nigeria and one in neighboring Benin. The Nigerian Yoruba alphabet is made up of 25 letters, without C, Q, V, X, Z, but with the additions of Ẹ, Ọ, Ṣ and Gb. However, many of the excluded consonants are present in several dialectal forms of Yoruba, including V, Z, and other digraphs (like ch, gh, and gw). Central Yoruba dialects also have two extra vowels that are allophones of I and U. It is somewhat unusual that in Nigeria the letter P usually transcribes [k͜p], being [p] only in restricted situations like onomatopoeia. The Beninese alphabet is similar, without C, Q, V, X, Z, and with the additions of Ɛ, Ɔ, Gb, Sh, and Kp.

== Letters ==
Yoruba alphabet (Nigeria)
Upper case	A	B	D	E	Ẹ	F	G	Gb	H	I	J	K	L	M	N	O	Ọ	P	R	S	Ṣ	T	U	W	Y
Lower case	a	b	d	e	ẹ	f	g	gb	h	i	j	k	l	m	n	o	ọ	p	r	s	ṣ	t	u	w	y
IPA	a	b	d	e	ɛ	f	g	ɡ͡b	h	i	d͡ʒ	k	l	m	n, ŋ̍, ̃	o	ɔ	k͡p, p	ɾ	s	ʃ	t	u	w, ʷ	j

The nasal vowels are written with digraphs: ⟨in⟩, ⟨ẹn⟩, ⟨an⟩, ⟨ọn⟩, ⟨un⟩, unless they come after ⟨n⟩. Long vowels are written double, as in dáadáa (transl. fine, okay). The high and low tones are written with acute and grave accents (á, à), while mid tone is unmarked (a), except for disambiguation on “n̄”. Combinations of these tones produce falling and rising tones, written e.g. â, ǎ when they are combined on a single vowel letter. These may appear on nasal consonants as well, as in ńkọ́ (how...?), nǹkan (things). An apostrophe may be used to mark an elided sound, at the choice of the writer, as in ń'lé (transl. at home), from ní ilé, but sọ́dọ̀ (transl. to a place), from sí ọ̀dọ̀. When n is a syllable of its own before a vowel, as in n ò lọ (transl. I didn't go), it is pronounced [ŋ̍] (plus tone).

Yoruba alphabet (Benin)
Upper case	A	B	D	E	Ɛ	F	G	GB	H	I	J	K	KP	L	M	N	O	Ɔ	P	R	S	SH	T	U	W	Y
Lower case	a	b	d	e	ɛ	f	g	gb	h	i	j	k	kp	l	m	n	o	ɔ	p	r	s	sh	t	u	w	y
IPA	a	b	d	e	ɛ	f	g	ɡ͡b	h	i	d͡ʒ	k	k͡p	l	m	n, ŋ̍	o	ɔ	p	ɾ	s	ʃ	t	u	w	j

In older signage, ⟨C⟩ may be seen for current ⟨Sh⟩.

== See also ==
- Pan-Nigerian alphabet
- Yoruba Braille
- Oduduwa script
- Vietnamese alphabet
