= Igbo alphabet =

Latin alphabet used for the Igbo language

Mkpụrụ Edemede Igbo Ásụ̀sụ́ Ìgbò
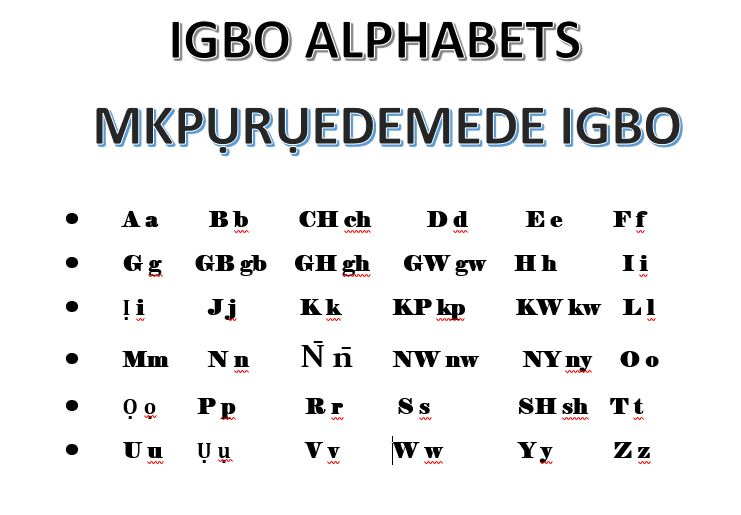
- Niger-Congo, Atlantic-Congo, Volta-Congo, Volta-Niger, Igboid
- Languages: Igbo; Written Igbo

ISO 15924
- ISO 15924: Latn (215), Latin

Unicode
- Unicode alias: Latin

The modern Igbo alphabet (Igbo: Mkpụrụ Edemede Igbo), otherwise known as the Igbo alphabet (Mkpụrụ Edemede Igbo), is the alphabet of the Igbo language, which is one of the three national languages of Nigeria. The modern Igbo alphabet is made up of 36 letters, which includes only a 24-letter set of the ISO basic Latin alphabet minus Q and X, which are not part of Abidịị Igbo. C is not used other than in the digraph 'ch'. The alphabet uses the dot above on the letter Ṅ, and the dot below on Ị, Ọ and Ụ.

There are numerous Igbo dialects, some of which are not mutually intelligible. The standard written form of Igbo is based on the Owerri and Umuahia dialects of Igbo.

A New Standard Orthography has been proposed for Igbo, and it was used, for example, in the 1998 Igbo English Dictionary by Michael Echeruo, but it has not been otherwise widely adopted. In this orthography, diaeresis replaces the dot below (ï ö ü).

Mkpụrụ Edemede Igbo
An Indigenous Igbo speaker reciting Mkpụrụ Edemede Igbo

== Letters ==
The 36-letter alphabet is called Mkpụrụ Edemede or Abidịị, featuring 28 consonants (mgbochiume) and 8 vowels (ụdaume).

Igbo alphabet
Aa IPA: a	Bb IPA: b	CHch IPA: t͡ʃ	Dd IPA: d	Ee IPA: e	Ff IPA: f	Gg IPA: g	GBgb IPA: ɡ͡ɓ~ɓ	GHgh IPA: ɣ
GWgw IPA: ɡʷ	Hh IPA: ɦ	Ii IPA: i	Ịị IPA: ɪ̙	Jj IPA: d͡ʒ	Kk IPA: k	KPkp IPA: k͡p~ɓ̥	KWkw IPA: kʷ	Ll IPA: l
Mm IPA: m	Nn IPA: n	Ṅṅ IPA: ŋ	NWnw IPA: nʷ	NYny IPA: ɲ	Oo IPA: o	Ọọ IPA: ɔ̙	Pp IPA: p	Rr IPA: ɹ~ɾ
Ss IPA: s	SHsh IPA: ʃ	Tt IPA: t	Uu IPA: u	Ụụ IPA: ʊ̙	Vv IPA: v	Ww IPA: w	Yy IPA: j	Zz IPA: z

== See also ==
- Igbo language
- Igbo people
- Pan-Nigerian alphabet
- Nwagu Aneke script
- Africa Alphabet
- African reference alphabet
