= Moba language =

Gur language spoken in West Africa

Moba
- Moba–Bimoba
- Native to: Togo, Ghana, Burkina Faso
- Ethnicity: Moba/Bimoba
- Native speakers: 440,000 (2004–2012)
- Language family: Niger–Congo?: Atlantic–Congo; Gur; Northern; Oti–Volta; Gurma; Moba
- Dialects: Moba; Bimoba
- Writing system: Latin (Moba alphabet); Moba Braille

Language codes
- ISO 639-3: Either: mfq – Moba bim – Bimoba
- Glottolog: moba1243

Moba or Bimoba is a Niger-Congo language spoken by the Moba people of Togo and Ghana. There are also some Moba speakers in Burkina Faso. It has two dialects (Moba in Togo and Burkina Faso and Bimoba in Ghana). The language cluster is also known as Moba–Bimoba.

== Classification ==
Moba-Bimoba is a Gur language, a subset of the proposed Niger-Congo language family. It, along with Bassari and Konkomba/Likpakpaln, is part of the Gurma (or Mabia) subgroup of Gur languages.

Moba is spoken by the Moba people. It is spoken by the Moba people in northern Ghana and Togo. There are also some Moba speakers in the central plateau of Burkina Faso.

Moba is a relatively important and vigorous language in Togo. It was one of the first four languages used for literacy training by Togo's government, and as of 2024, remains one of ten languages used for this purpose. Ethnologue lists Moba as stable, but the Bimoba dialect as endangered.

== Phonology ==
Bimoba has twenty-two consonants and six vowels.

=== Consonants ===
The singly-articulated consonants of Bimoba are listed below.

Consonant phonemes
	Bilabial		Labio- dental	Alveolar		Post- alveolar (Palato- alveolar)		Palatal	Velar		Glottal
Plosive	p	b		t	d				k	ɡ	
Affricate						tʃ	dʒ				
Fricative			f	s							h
Nasal		m			n			ɲ		ŋ	
Trill					r						
Approximant								j			
Lateral approximant					l						

The Bimoba dialect also has four doubly-articulated consonants, all of which involve labial and velar occlusions. One is the labiovelar approximant /w/, and the other three are the voiced and voiceless stops (/gb/, /kp/) and voiced nasal /ŋm/.

=== Vowels ===
Chanard lists six vowels in Bimoba. Moba has both oral and nasal vowels, and has a distinction between long and short vowels.

Monophthong phonemes
	Front	Back
	unrounded	rounded
Close	i	u
Close-mid	e	o
Open-mid		ɔ
Open	a	

=== Tones ===
Moba is a tonal language, with four tones. It exhibits downstep, meaning that the second of two consecutive identical tones is slightly lowered compared to the first. Tone patterns also form the core of a whistled language based on Moba.

Moba is a register tone language, like other Gur languages, but it incorporates a fourth, extrahigh tone in addition to the three-level high, middle, low tone system of most other Gur languages. (Bariba is another Gur four-tone language.) The fourth tone appears to have been a result of segmental attrition in Moba compared to its sister languages. Specifically, Moba lost final vowels that other languages retained:

Cognates between Gulmancema and Moba
Gulmancema tone	Gulmancema word	Moba word	Moba tone
high-low	/kándì/	/ka̋nt/	extrahigh
high-high	/kándí/	/kánt/	high

In three-tone Gur languages, the underlying high tone is pronounced higher before a low tone than before a high tone, though this difference is not contrastive. Moba lost the second syllable (and thus the second tone) but retained the phonetic distinction between extrahigh and high tones, and has grammaticalized that difference as a fourth tone.

== Grammar ==
Moba is an SVO language, like English. It has both a noun class system and a verb class system. Most Moba morphemes are monosyllabic. Negation generally occurs before the verb, but is placed clause-finally in some constructions.

== Writing system ==
Bimoba alphabet (SIL) All letters correspond to IPA unless noted
a	b	ch /tʃ/	d	e	f	g	gb	h	i	j /dʒ/	k	kp	l	m	n	ny /ɲ/	ŋ	ŋm	o	ɔ	p	r	s	t	u	w	y /j/

Moba alphabet (Peace Corps Togo)
a	ã	b	c	d	e	ẽ	ɛ	ɛ̃	f	g	h	i	ĩ	ɩ	ɩ̃	j	k	l	m	n	ŋ	o	õ	ɔ	ɔ̃	p	s	t	r	u	v	w	y
