= Dossena (surname) =

Dossena is an Italian surname.

- Alberto Dossena (born 1998), Italian football player
- Alceo Dossena (1878–1937), Italian sculptor
- Cosimo Dossena (1547–1620), Italian Roman Catholic Bishop of Tortona from 1612 to 1620
- Andrea Dossena (born 1981), Italian footballer
- Emilio Giuseppe Dossena (1903–1987), Italian painter
- Giuseppe Dossena (born 1958), Italian football manager
- Luigi Dossena (1925–2007), Italian archbishop and Vatican diplomat
- Paolo Dossena (born 1942), Italian record producer, lyricist, arranger and composer
- Renato Dossena (born 1987), Italian footballer who plays as a goalkeeper
- Sara Dossena (born 1984), Italian female long-distance runner
- Tiziano Thomas Dossena (born 1952), Italian American author and art critic

== See also ==
- Dossena
- Dossi
