= Bobo Wule =

Bobo Wule may refer to:

- Bobo Wule people
- Bobo Wule languages
