= Colautti =

Colautti is an Italian surname. Notable people with the surname include:

- Arturo Colautti (1851–1914), Italian journalist and librettist
- Piergiorgio Colautti (born 1934), Italian painter and sculptor
- Roberto Colautti (born 1982), Argentine retired footballer

== See also ==
- Colautti v. Franklin
