= Cymbeline (disambiguation) =

Cymbeline or Cymbaline may refer to:

== Film ==
- Cymbeline (film), a 2014 film adaptation of the play by William Shakespeare

== History ==
- Cunobeline (died c. 40), ancient British king whose name in legend became Cymbeline

== Military ==
- Cymbeline (radar), a mortar locating radar

== Music ==
- "Cymbaline", a 1969 song from the Pink Floyd album Soundtrack from the Film More
- "Cymbeline", a song from the Loreena McKennitt album The Visit
- "Cimbelino", a lyric drama in 4 acts by Niccolò van Westerhout
- "Cymbeline", a composition by Philip Glass to accompany the Shakespeare play
- "Cymbeline", a composition by Alexander von Zemlinsky to accompany the Shakespeare play
- Cymbaline, an off-stage character referenced by one of the four bridge-playing characters in Samuel Barber's short opera A Hand of Bridge

== Theatre ==
- Cymbeline, a play by William Shakespeare
  - BBC Television Shakespeare – Season Six – Cymbaline (1983) directed by Elijah Moshinsky

== Gastronomy ==
- "Cimbalino", a Portuguese expression for the typical espresso of Porto
