= Bomu language =

Gur language spoken in Mali and Burkina Faso

Bo
- Western Bobo Wule
- Bomu
- Region: Burkina Faso, Mali
- Ethnicity: Bwa
- Native speakers: 320,000 in Mali (2022); 60,000 in Burkina Faso (1991)
- Language family: Niger–Congo?: Atlantic–Congo; Gur; Northern Gur; Bwa; Bo
- Dialects: Mao; Dwemu; Dahanmu

Language codes
- ISO 639-3: bmq
- Glottolog: bomu1247

- Person: Bo
- People: Bwa
- Language: Bomu

The Bo language of West Africa, Bomu (Boomu), also identified as Western Bobo Wule, is a Gur language of Burkina Faso and Mali.

Bomu is spoken by two groups of Bwa people, the Red Bobo, Bobo Wule (also spelled Bobo Oule), and the White Bobo, Bobo Gbe, also known as Kyan (also spelled Kian, Tian, Tyan, Can, Chan) or Tyanse.
