= Buamu language =

Gur language of Burkina Faso

Bwa
- Eastern Bobo Wule
- Buamu
- Region: Burkina Faso
- Ethnicity: Bwa
- Native speakers: 270,000 (2009)
- Language family: Niger–Congo?: Atlantic–Congo; Gur; Northern Gur; Bwa; Bwa
- Dialects: Ouarkoye Bwamu

Language codes
- ISO 639-3: box
- Glottolog: buam1238

- Person: Bwa
- People: Bwaba
- Language: Bwamu

The principal Bwa language, Eastern Bobo Wule (Buamu, Bwamu), is a Gur language of Burkina Faso. It is one of several closely related languages with the name.
