= BWY =

BWY or bwy may refer to:

- bWy (musician), a German conscious musician merging Rap and Drum & Bass
- British Wheel of Yoga, a British exercise charity
- Bellway, a British housebuilder (LSE ticker:BWY)
- Cwi Bwamu language, spoken in Burkina Faso (ISO 639-3:bwy)
