= Emilio Giuseppe Dossena =

Italian painter (1903–1987)

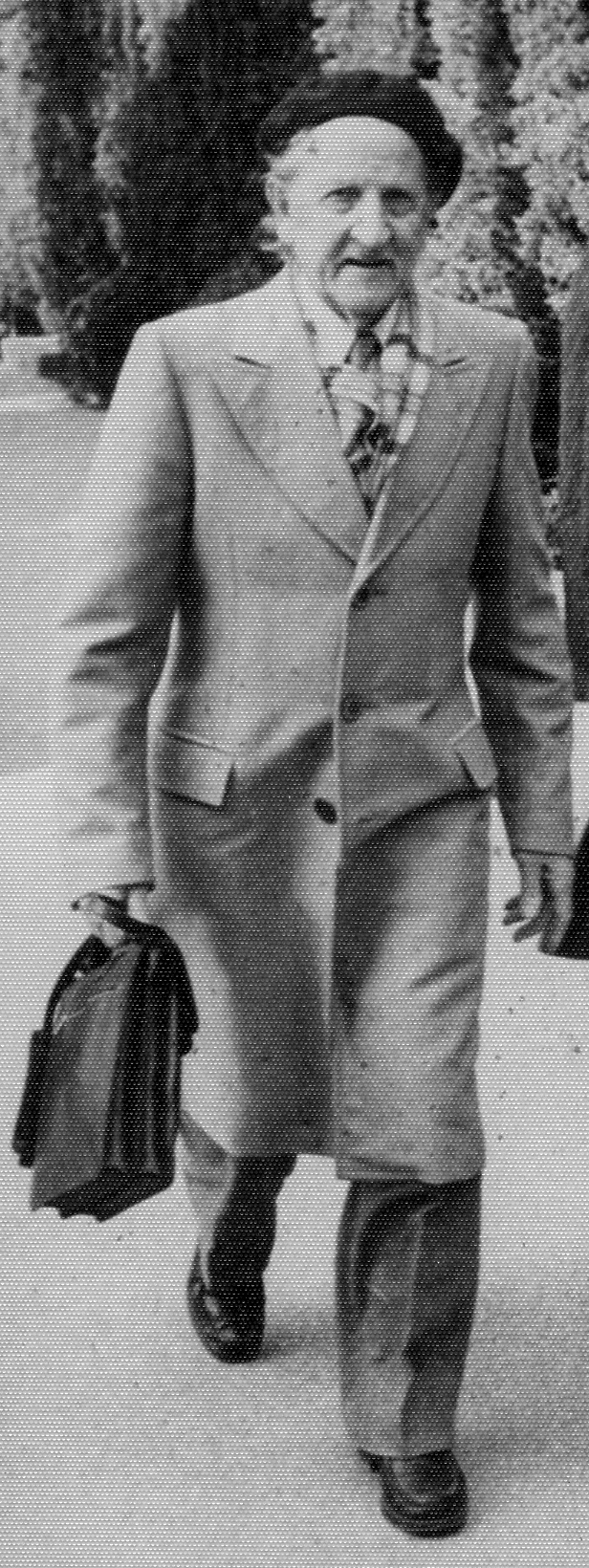
- Dossena strolling through Mallorca, 1982
- Born: December 10, 1903; Cavenago d'Adda, Lombardy, Kingdom of Italy
- Died: March 23, 1987 (aged 83); Milan, Lombardy, Italy
- Occupation: Artist
- Children: Tiziano Thomas Dossena

Emilio Giuseppe Dossena (December 10, 1903 – March 23, 1987) was an Italian painter who was born in Cavenago d'Adda and died in Milan.

== Education ==
He attended the Brera Academy (Milan) and the Scuola del Castello (Milan), where he formed strong friendships with Aligi Sassu, Ernesto Treccani, Renato Guttuso, Domenico Cantatore and Umberto Lilloni. At the Scuola del Castello he won a prize for his sculpture works (a trip to Venice), but his attraction toward color made him choose painting as the medium of artistic communication.

== Career ==
Although his tendency toward impressionism was evident from the beginning, the necessity to provide for his family forced him to dedicate only his spare time to this aspect of the arts. He therefore earned his livelihood for many years with the restoration and the decoration of villas and castles, in addition to producing frescoes for the local churches. In the residences of Pirelli, Falck, Borletti, Invernizzi, Necchi, Toscanini, Count Cicogna, Duke Gallarati Scotti, and Count Castelbarco, Emilio Giuseppe Dossena decorated, restored and painted large panels with mythological and archaic themes and battles. His works were also in the Italian Embassy in Addis Abeba, Ethiopia, but were destroyed by air raids during WWII.

His passion for artistic expression allowed him to retain his creative integrity, and he became a sought-after impressionist, known for the sensibility of his works as much as for the dynamic strokes that characterized them. His first solo exhibit, at the Galleria Gavioli in Milan (1943), was a success with the critics and the public, and all of the paintings were purchased by collectors.

The exhibit at the Galleria Hoepli in Milan (1964), and the one at the Palazzo dell’Arredamento, in Desio (1967), also achieved a good response, earning a place on the prestigious Enciclopedia dell’Arte (Edizioni SEDA, Milan).

Until the mid-1950s, Dossena signed his paintings GDossena (for Giuseppe Dossena), but the signature mutated in E.G.Dossena after that period.

After the artist lost his studio in a fire, he moved in 1968 to Brooklyn, New York, and resided at 54 Cheever Place in Carroll Gardens and was employed by Studio Berger, restoring works by Renoir, Rembrandt, Picasso and other masters, property of museums and private collections, among which stand out the Metropolitan Museum of New York and the Playboy Club.

In New York, the artist temporarily abandoned his impressionist roots, embracing the neo-expressionism, creating shapes more simplified, almost essential, without any schematism or structural restrictions. The shape is almost snatched from nature, in continued research to contain and interpret the existential essence and express these new inescapable sensations, which the artist feels away from his country.

== Exhibits ==
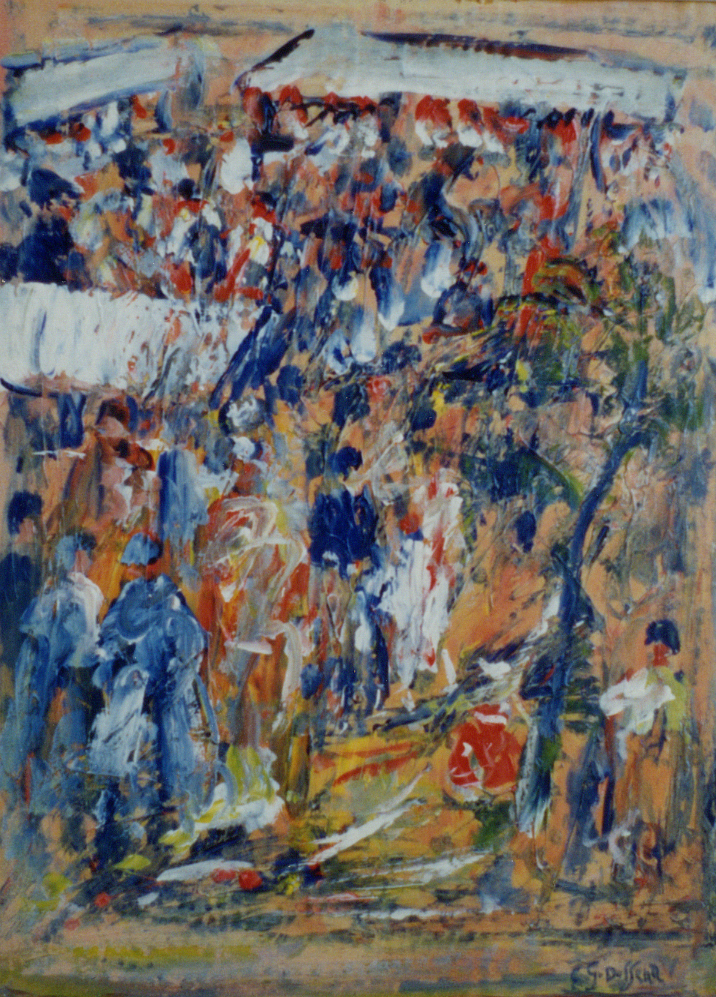
Emilio Giuseppe Dossena, Giorno Di Mercato, 1976 (Expressionist period).

The exhibits at the Columbus Citizens Foundation (1973) and the Galerie Internationale (1973, 1974) gave unforeseen positive results. Dorothy Hall, art critic of NY Park East magazine, stated: "These are exuberant works in rich, assertive color, dealing with varied subject matter, both abstract and representational. In either case, there's a feeling of nervous energy bursting forth in the artist's treatment of generously flowered fields, butterflies, still lifes and dancing figures …”

Dossena exhibited at the Galleria Treves (Spotorno, 1977), Galleria Il Portichetto (Stresa, 1978), and the Circolo Ambrosiano Meneghin e Cecca (Milan, 1983). The specialized press covered these events profusely, offering only positive comments. The art critic Mario Portalupi affirmed: “In truth, his painting process is born out of impressions and the subsequent emotions, which transform reality and regulate the chromatic entities on the canvas…”

== Reception ==
Mario Albertazzi, the Il Progresso Italo-Americano art critic, added: "Brilliant colorist, he brings to his canvas the light of nature and the joy of life. His works…are rich in density and at the same time buoyant, restless and gentle as a delicate caress…"

After eight years he returned to Italy and devoted his time exclusively to painting. He regained his impressionistic tendencies, although with a more aggressive chromatic handling.

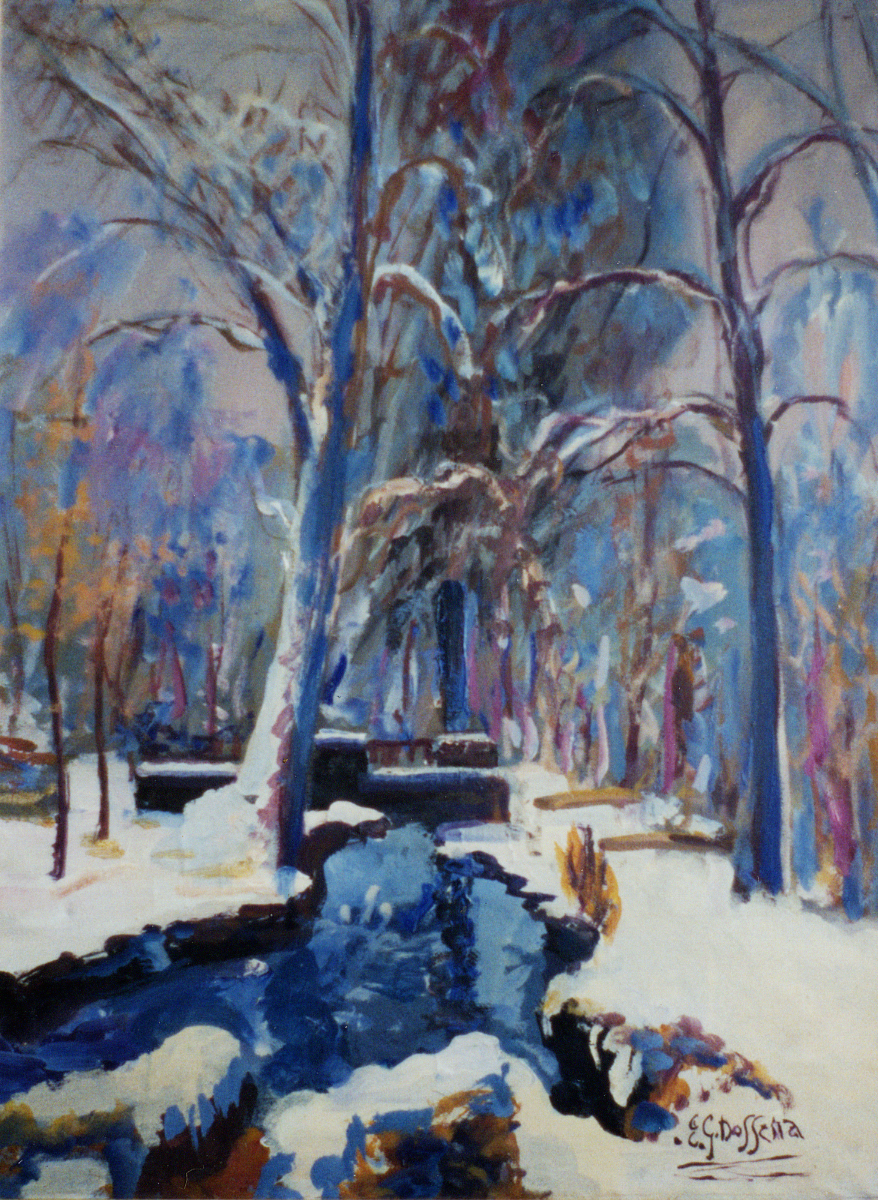
Emilio Giuseppe Dossena, Parco Sempione, 1980 (Late impressionist period).

His friend Enzo Lepore, a renowned opera singer, stated: “Dossena…excels for the luminous harmony of the chromatic contrasts and he distinguishes himself for the expressive purity of his vigorous and original style… His paintings are fresh, palpitating, and rich with a vast conception and spirituality, in a frame of radiant and intensive colors…”

== Honors and awards ==
Among the many honors he received, in 1985 Dossena was awarded the prestigious Ambrogino d'Oro per l'Arte from the City of Milan, and in 1989 a ceramic tile with his signature is placed in the famous Muretto di Alassio.

Dossena was a member of numerous academies and artistic associations, among them the Accademia Tiberina and the Accademia dei Bronzi. In the last years of his life, the artist, ill and unable to paint, devoted himself to poetry, receiving numerous awards and appearing in a variety of literary anthologies. The exhibit at the Trask Gallery of the National Arts Club of New York, organized in 1998 by the magazine L'Idea of Brooklyn in his memory, beat all the participation records and it was the first one for an Italian artist in such an institution.
