= BWJ =

BWJ may refer to:

- Bawan Airport (IATA code BWJ), in Bawan, Papua New Guinea; see List of airports by IATA airport code: B
- Blind Willie Johnson, American blues and spirituals singer and guitarist
- Bobby Witt Jr., American baseball player for the Kansas City Royals
- Láá Láá Bwamu language (ISO 639 bwj), a Gur language of Burkina Faso
