= Lo Schiavo (disambiguation) =

Lo Schiavo is a surname.

- John Lo Schiavo
- Linda Ann Lo Schiavo

It may also refer to:

- Lo schiavo, Carlos Gomes
