= Mario Cortiello =

Italian painter

- Born: 1 July 1907; Naples, Italy
- Died: 23 December 1981 (aged 74); San Sebastiano al Vesuvio, Italy
- Occupations: Painter, illustrator

Mario Cortiello (Italian: Mario Cortiello; 1 July 1907 – 23 December 1981) was an Italian painter and illustrator, one of the notable representatives of Neapolitan painting, also known as "Chagall of Naples".

== Life and career ==
Mario Cortiello began his artistic journey as a student of the renowned Neapolitan painter Gennaro Villani, a frequent participant of the Venice Biennale. Later, he formed a friendship and creative partnership with the Milanese artist Umberto Lilloni and joined the art movement Chiarismo lombardo. However, this collaboration was also short-lived, as Cortiello soon developed his own artistic style, rooted in the classical traditions of Neapolitan art. A characteristic feature of his independent work became the “thoughtful and dreamlike Pulcinellas” floating through surreal landscapes - a motif reminiscent of Marc Chagall, which ultimately earned him the nickname "Chagall of Naples".

In 1930, Cortiello participated in his first Venice Biennale - a prestigious event he continued to take part in regularly until 1948. In 1935, his works were exhibited at the 2nd Rome Quadriennale. In 1939, he became one of the laureates of the esteemed Italian Premio Bergamo. His exhibitions were held in prominent galleries across Europe and the United States. The highlight of this period came during the XIV Summer Olympic Games in London (1948), where he took part in the Art Competitions at the 1948 Summer Olympics, with the fine and visual arts section held at the Victoria and Albert Museum. Although his 1947 painting Gara Ippica ("Horse Race") did not win a medal, it left a strong impression on both the audience and critics.

During the 1950s–1970s, Cortiello drew his inspiration from various painting genres. He traveled extensively throughout Italy, producing landscapes and portraits set against regions he admired, often embellished with his own fantasy. Despite the abundance of works portraying life-affirming southern Italian moods, Cortiello also paid tribute to the north of Italy - particularly to Lombardy and Venice, which were close to him.

Several print editions were released featuring engravings based on his artworks. In 1971, the Neapolitan Philosophical Dictionary. Sayings, Proverbs and Expressions was published, including 24 engravings by Cortiello.

After the artist’s death in 1981, his work temporarily slightly fell out of public and critical attention. However, since the late 1990s, interest in Cortiello's paintings has revived, as evidenced by several of his works being sold by the Christie’s auction house. In 2006, one of his paintings was selected for the traveling exhibition "Il Treno dell’Arte" ("The Art Train"), which featured works by 100 of the most significant Italian contemporary artists. The municipality of Massa di Somma named a street in his honor (Vialle Cortiello). In 2008, a retrospective was held at Castel dell’Ovo in Naples to commemorate the 100th anniversary of his birth.

Mario Cortiello’s works are held in the Galleria d’arte moderna Ricci Oddi in Piacenza, in gallery and museums collections across Lombardy and Campania, as well as in numerous private collections.
