= Mola di Bari railway station =

Railway station in Mola di Bari, Italy

Mola di Bari
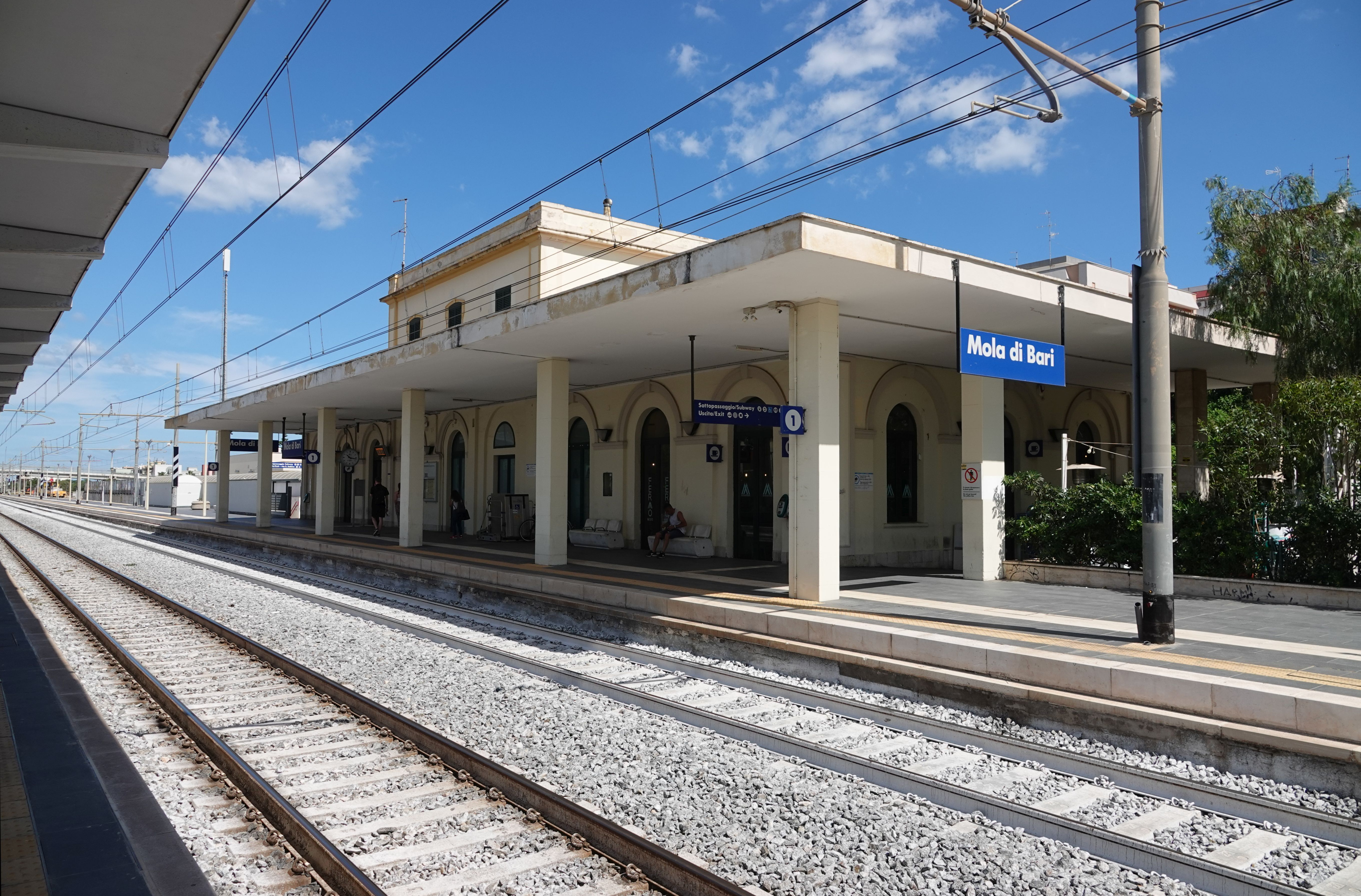

General information
- Location: Mola di Bari; Mola di Bari, Bari, Apulia; Italy
- Coordinates: 41°03′26″N 17°04′51″E
- Operator: Rete Ferroviaria Italiana
- Line: Ancona–Lecce (Trenitalia)
- Platforms: 3
- Train operators: Trenitalia

Other information
- Classification: Bronze

History
- Opened: 1865; 161 years ago
Location
- Location within Apulia Location within Italy

Mola di Bari (Italian: Stazione di Mola di Bari) is a railway station in the Italian town of Mola di Bari, in the Province of Bari, Apulia. The station lies on the Adriatic Railway (Ancona–Lecce). The train services are operated by Trenitalia.

== Train services ==
The station is served by the following service(s):

- Regional services (Treno regionale) Foggia-Bari - Monopoli - Brindisi - Lecce

== See also ==
- Railway stations in Italy
- List of railway stations in Apulia
- Rail transport in Italy
- History of rail transport in Italy
