= Nicola van Westerhout =

Italian composer

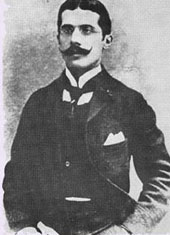
Niccolò van Westerhout

Nicola van Westerhout (also Niccolò; 17 December 1857 – 21 August 1898) was an Italian composer.

== Biography ==
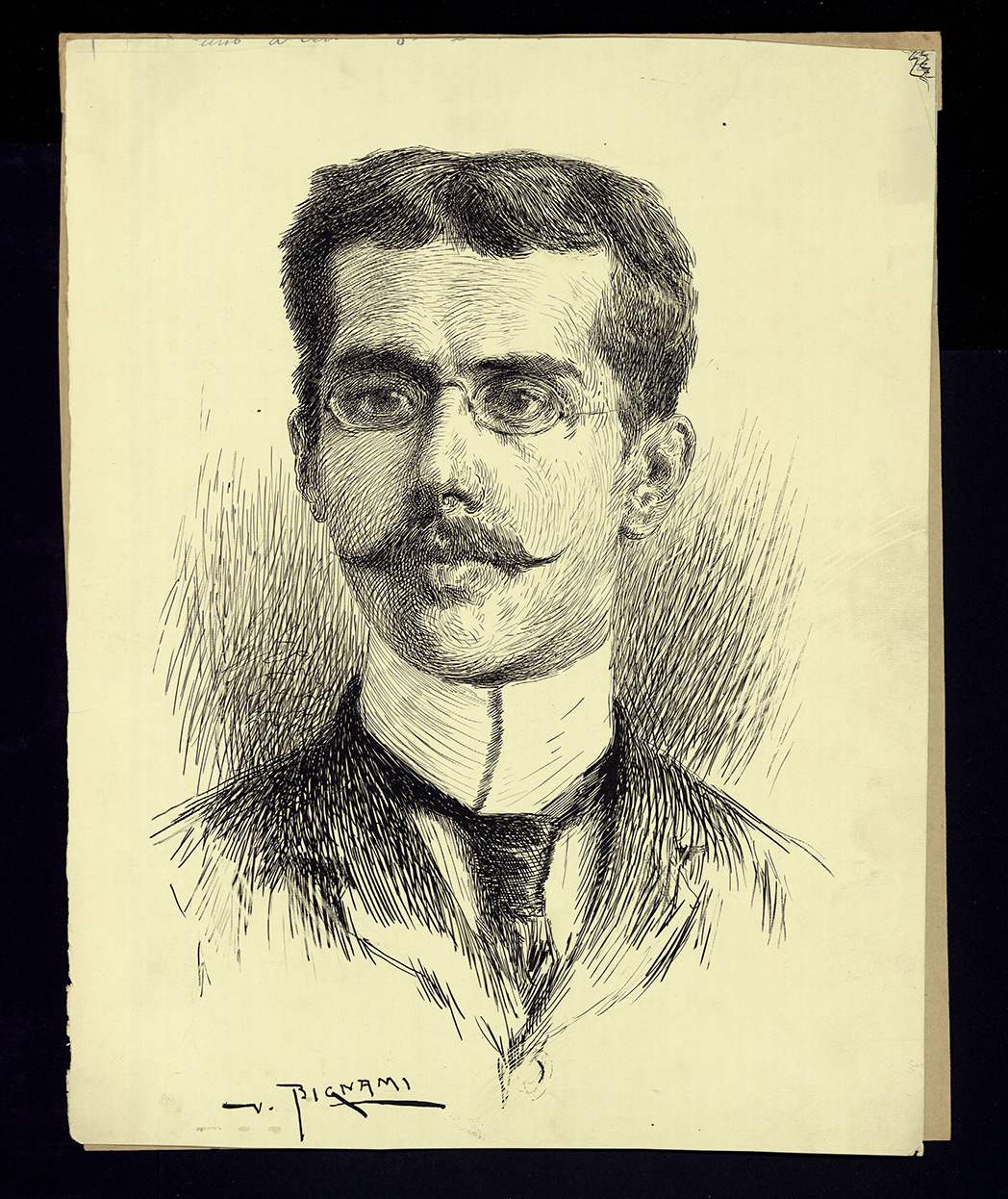
Nicola van Westerhout portrayed by Vespasiano Bignami

=== Early life and education ===
Of Flemish origin, the family van Westerhout settled in Apulia in the seventeenth century, first in Bari and then in Monopoli. Nicola van Westerhout, grandfather of Niccolò, moved to Mola di Bari, where the composer himself and his father, Onofrio Augustine, were both born.

At the age of 13, van Westerhout composed an opera on the subject of Shakespeare's Julius Caesar, showing remarkable musical talent. He was then helped, by the City Council of Mola di Bari, to move to Naples and attend the Conservatory of San Pietro a Majella, where he studied composition with Nicola De Giosa, Nicola D'Arienzo and Lauro Rossi.

=== Career and musical style ===
Westerhout spent the rest of his life in Naples, where he established himself as a pianist and composer. In 1897, one year before his death, he returned to the Naples Conservatory as harmony teacher.

While the majority of Westerhout's compositions are instrumental and vocal chamber music, he is perhaps best known for his operatic works. His operas include: Tilde, which has been lost; Cimbelino, which was first performed at the Teatro Argentina in Rome in 1892; Fortunio, represented in Milan in 1894 (intended, originally, at the Teatro alla Scala in Milan, but then staged at the Teatro Lirico), Doña Flor, at the Teatro Municipale in Mola di Bari in 1896, Colomba, represented in 1925 at the Teatro San Carlo.

Musicologist Sergio Martinotti notes that van Westerhout's musical style, which "combine[s] French elegance and a tendency towards classicism," was not in vogue in the Neapolitan musical circles van Westerhout frequented.

=== Death and legacy ===
Westerhout died in Naples. Because of indigence besetting the family, the City of Naples paid for funeral and burial in the monumental Cemetery of Poggioreale.

After the death of Niccolò, his friends and his brother Vincenzo tried to offer his music compositions to various publishers; while they were able to sustain publication of his music for a few decades after his death, they were ultimately unable to bear the costs necessary for its distribution, and his music was later forgotten.

Recently, the tomb that housed the remains of the composer and some of his relatives has been identified at the Congregation of St. Raphael a Mater Dei. On 19 February 2007, the 150th anniversary of the birth, the bones were then transported to the city that gave him birth and now rest in the family tomb of the De Stasi family's mausoleum in the local cemetery.

In Mola di Bari, the composer had been commemorated with the naming of a street and the municipal theater and the placing of a plaque at the site of the birthplace. Furthermore, in the central Piazza XX Settembre, a bronze statue by Molese sculptor Bruno Calvani, representing the protagonist of the Doña Flor, was placed.

== Catalog ==
Sempre amore Romanza on a text by Mancini

=== Operas ===
- Cimbelino, lyrical drama in four acts, libretto by Enrico Golisciani, (Rome, Teatro Argentina, 1892)
- Fortunio, lyrical drama in three acts, libretto by Giulio Massimo Scalinger, (Milan, Teatro Lirico, 16 May 1895)
- Doña Flor, lyrical drama in one act, libretto by Arturo Colautti, (Mola di Bari, 18 April 1896)
- Colomba, libretto by Arturo Colautti, (Naples, Teatro San Carlo, 1925)
- Tilde (unperformed)
- A Night in Venice (unfinished), later integrated in Cimbelino
- Imogene (unfinished), later integrated in Cimbelino

== Bibliography ==
- Massimeo A., Niccolò Van Westerhout, Laterza, Bari, 1985.
- Summa, M., Destati, o bruna. Doña Flor di Niccolò van Westerhout, Lodo Editore, Latiano 1998.
- AA.VV. Un musicista crepuscolare: Niccolò Van Westerhout (1857-1898)(a cura di G.Ciliberti) Florestano, Bari, 2007. (The authors of this collection of essays are mostly students of the "Scuola di didattica della musica" of the Conservatorio "N.Rota" in Monopoli).
- Leonardo Campanile e Tiziano Thomas Dossena, Doña Flor, an opera by Niccolò van Westerhout, Idea Publications, New York, 2010, ISBN 978-0-9825373-2-9
- Leonardo Campanile e Tiziano Thomas Dossena, Colomba, by Niccolò van Westerhout; Drama in Four Acts, Idea Press, Port St. Lucie, 2020, ISBN 978-1-948651-15-8
- Leonardo Campanile e Tiziano Thomas Dossena, Cimbelino, by Niccolò van Westerhout; Drama in Four Acts, Idea Press, Port St. Lucie, 2020, ISBN 978-1-948651-12-7
- Leonardo Campanile e Tiziano Thomas Dossena, Doña Flor, by Niccolò van Westerhout; Drama in One Act, Idea Press, Port St. Lucie, 2020, ISBN 978-1-948651-14-1
- Leonardo Campanile e Tiziano Thomas Dossena, Fortunio, by Niccolò van Westerhout; Drama in Three Acts, Idea Press, Port St. Lucie, 2020, ISBN 978-1-948651-13-4
- Niccolò van Westerhout, Liriche per Voce e Pianoforte, Idea Press, Port St. Lucie, 2018, ISBN 978-1-948651-06-6
- Niccolò van Westerhout, Liriche - Songs For Voice and Piano, Idea Press, Port St. Lucie, 2017, ISBN 978-0-9984873-2-8
- Niccolò van Westerhout, Doña Flor, Vocal Score, Idea Press, Port St. Lucie, 2014, ISBN 978-0-9825373-7-4
