= Voiced velar nasal =

Consonantal sound represented by ⟨ŋ⟩ in IPA

ŋ
- IPA number: 119

Audio sample
- source · help

Encoding
- Entity (decimal): &#331;
- Unicode (hex): U+014B
- X-SAMPA: N
- Braille: ⠫ (braille pattern dots-1246)
Image

A voiced velar nasal, also known as eng, engma, or agma (from Greek ἆγμα âgma 'fragment'), is a type of consonantal sound used in some spoken languages. It is the sound of ng in English sing, as well as n before velar consonants as in English and ink.

The symbol in the International Phonetic Alphabet that represents this sound is ⟨ŋ⟩. The IPA symbol ⟨ŋ⟩ is similar to ⟨ɳ⟩, the symbol for the retroflex nasal, which has a rightward-pointing hook extending from the bottom of the right stem, and to ⟨ɲ⟩, the symbol for the palatal nasal, which has a leftward-pointing hook extending from the bottom of the left stem.

While almost all languages have /m/ and /n/ as phonemes, /ŋ/ is rarer. Half of the 469 languages surveyed in Anderson (2008) had a velar nasal phoneme; as a further curiosity, many of them limit its occurrence to the syllable coda. The velar nasal does not occur in many of the languages of the Americas, the Middle East, or the Caucasus, but it is extremely common among Australian Aboriginal languages, languages of Sub-Saharan Africa, East Asian and Southeast Asian languages, and Polynesian languages. The Láá Láá Bwamu language is one of the few languages that has the sound as its only nasal consonant. In many languages that do not have the velar nasal as a phoneme, such as most of the Romance languages, it occurs as an allophone of /n/ before velar consonants. This kind of assimilation can even be found in languages with phonemic voiced velar nasals, such as English. An example of this phenomenon is the word income; its underlying representation, /ˈɪnˌkʌm/, can be realized as either [ˈɪnˌkʌm] or [ˈɪŋˌkʌm].

An example of a language that lacks a phonemic or allophonic velar nasal is Russian, in which /n/ is pronounced as laminal denti-alveolar [n̪] even before velar consonants.

Some languages have a pre-velar nasal, which is articulated slightly more front compared with the place of articulation of the prototypical velar nasal, though not as front as the prototypical palatal nasal – see that article for more information.

Conversely, some languages have a post-velar nasal, which is articulated slightly behind the place of articulation of a prototypical velar nasal, though not as back as the prototypical uvular nasal.

== Features ==
Sagittal section of a voiced velar nasal

Features of a voiced velar nasal:

- Its manner of articulation is occlusive, which means it is produced by obstructing airflow in the vocal tract. Because the consonant is also nasal, the blocked airflow is redirected through the nose.
- Its place of articulation is velar, which means it is articulated with the back of the tongue (the dorsum) at the soft palate.
- Its phonation is voiced, which means the vocal cords vibrate during the articulation.
- It is a nasal consonant, which means air is exclusively allowed to escape through the nose for nasal stops; otherwise, in addition to through the mouth.
- It is a median consonant, which means it is produced by directing the airstream down the midline of the tongue, rather than to the sides.
- Its airstream mechanism is pulmonic, which means it is articulated by pushing air only with the intercostal muscles and abdominal muscles, as in most speech sounds.

== Occurrence ==
Language		Word	IPA	Meaning	Notes
Albanian		ngaqë	[ŋɡacə]	'because'	
Aleut		chaang / ча̄ӈ	[tʃɑːŋ]	'five'	
Arabic	Hejazi	مــنــقل / mingal	[mɪŋɡal]	'brazier'	Allophone of /n/ before velar stops. See Hejazi Arabic phonology
Armenian	Eastern	ընկեր / ënker	[əŋˈkɛɾ]	'friend'	Allophone of /n/ before velar consonants
Assamese		ৰং / ŗông	[ɹɔŋ]	'color'	
Asturian		non	[nõŋ]	'no'	Allophone of /n/ in word-final position, either before consonants other than velar stops or vowel-beginning words or before a pause.
Bambara		ŋonI	[ŋoni]	'guitar'	
Bashkir		мең / meñ / مىُڭ	[mɪ̞ŋ]	'one thousand'	
Basque		hanka	[haŋka]	'leg'	
Bengali		রঙ / rông	[ɾɔŋ]	'color'	
Bulgarian		тънко / tănko	[ˈtɤŋko]	'thin'	
Burmese		ငရုတ်	[ŋə joʊʔ]	'chilli'	
Cantonese		昂 / ngòhng	[ŋɔːŋ˩]	'raise'	See Cantonese phonology
Catalan		sang	[ˈs̺ɑ̃ŋ(k)]	'blood'	See Catalan phonology
Cebuano		ngano	[ˈŋano]	'why'	
Chamorro		ngånga'	[ŋɑŋaʔ]	'duck'	
Chukchi		ӈыроӄ / ṇyroq	[ŋəɹoq]	'three'	
Czech		tank	[taŋk]	'tank'	See Czech phonology
Dinka		ŋa	[ŋa]	'who'	
Danish		sang	[sɑŋˀ]	'song'	See Danish phonology
Dutch		angst	[ɑŋst]	'fear'	See Dutch phonology
Eastern Min		疑 / ngì	[ŋi^{53}]	'suspect'	
English		sing	[sɪŋ]	'sing'	Restricted to the syllable coda. See English phonology
Faroese		ong	[ɔŋk]	'meadow'	
Fijian		gone	[ˈŋone]	'child'	
Finnish		kangas	[ˈkɑŋːɑs]	'cloth'	Occurs in native vocabulary only intervocally (as a geminate) and before /k/. See Finnish phonology
French	Standard	camping	[kɑ̃piŋ(ɡ)]	'camping'	Occurs mainly in words borrowed from English or Chinese. See French phonology
French	Southern France	pain	[pɛŋ]	'bread'	For many speakers, [ŋ] acts as a substitute for the nasalization of the preceding vowel, which may still be partially nasal. It is one of the most typical traits of varieties of French influenced by an Occitan substrate.
Galician		unha	[ˈuŋa]	'one' (f.)	
Gan		牙 / nga	[ŋa]	'tooth'	
German		lang	[laŋ]	'long'	See Standard German phonology
Georgian		ანგარება / angareba	[äŋgäɾe̞bä]	'egoism/greed'	Allophone of /n/ before /k/ and /g/ in colloquial or fast speech.
Greek		άγχος / anchos	['aŋxo̞s]	'Stress'	See Modern Greek phonology
Hakka	Sixian	我 / ngai	[ŋai˨˦]	'I'	
Hebrew	Standard	אנגלית / anglit	[aŋɡˈlit]	'English language'	Allophone of /n/ before velar stops. See Modern Hebrew phonology
Hebrew	Sephardi	עין / nayin	[ŋaˈjin]	'Ayin'	See Sephardi Hebrew
Hiligaynon		buang	[bu'äŋ]	'crazy/mentally unstable'	
Hindustani	Hindi	रंग / रङ्ग / raṅg	[rəŋg]	'color'	See Hindustani phonology
Hindustani	Urdu	رن٘گ / raṅg	[rəŋg]	'color'	See Hindustani phonology
Ho		maraṅ	[maraŋ]	'big'	
Hungarian		ing	[iŋɡ]	'shirt'	Allophone of /n/ before /g/. See Hungarian phonology
Icelandic		göng	[ˈkœy̯ŋk]	'tunnel'	See Icelandic phonology
Ilocano		ngalngal	[ŋalŋal]	'to chew'	
Inuktitut		ᐴᙳᐆᖅ / puunnguuq	[puːŋŋuːq]	'dog'	
Inuvialuktun		qamnguiyuaq	[qamŋuijuaq]	'snores'	
Irish		a nglór	[ˌə̃ ˈŋl̪ˠoːɾˠ]	'their voice'	Occurs word-initially as a result of the consonantal mutation eclipsis. See Irish phonology
Italian		anche	[ˈaŋke]	'also'	Allophone of /n/ before /k/ and /ɡ/. See Italian phonology
Itelmen		қниң	[qniŋ]	'one'	
Japanese	Standard	南極 / nankyoku	[naŋkʲokɯ]	'the South Pole'	See Japanese phonology
Japanese	Eastern dialects	鍵 / kagi	[kaŋi]	'key'	See Japanese phonology
Javanese		sengak	[səŋak]	stink	Additional /ŋ/ caused by vowel after /ŋ/ sounding
Jin	Yuci	我 / ngie	[ŋie]	'I'	
Kagayanen		manang	[manaŋ]	'older sister'	
Karelian		ongi	[ˈoŋɡi]	'fishing rod'	Occurs only before /g/, /k/ and /kk/.
Karen	Eastern Pwo	ငယ်ငဝ်	[ŋɛ̀ ŋɔ̀]	'enter into a heated argument'	
Karen	Western Pwo	ငါငီၩငါစၪ	[ŋâ ŋɔ́ ŋâ sà]	'stupid; not very intelligent'	
Kazakh		мың / myń / مىڭ	[məŋ]	'thousand'	
Kyrgyz		миң / miñ / مئڭ	[miŋ]	'thousand'	
Ket		аяң / ajaņ	[ajaŋ]	'to damn'	
Kharia		लअङ	[lǎŋ]	'tongue'	A pervasive rising tone related to stress is found in monosyllabic stems. See Anderson (2014) for discussion.
Khasi		ngap	[ŋap]	'honey'	
Khmer		ងាយ / ngéay; កសាង / kâsang	[ŋiəj]; [kɑːsaːŋ]	'easy'; 'to build'	See Khmer phonology
Korean		성에 / seonge	[sʌŋe]	'window frost'	See Korean phonology
Kurdish	Northern	ceng / جه‌نگ	[dʒɛŋ]	'war'	See Kurdish phonology
Kurdish	Central	جه‌نگ / ceng	[dʒɛŋ]	'war'	See Kurdish phonology
Kurdish	Southern	جه‌نگ / ceng	[dʒɛŋ]	'war'	See Kurdish phonology
Luganda		ŋaaŋa	[ŋɑːŋɑ]	'hornbill'	
Luxembourgish		keng	[kʰæŋ]	'nobody'	See Luxembourgish phonology
Macedonian		aнглиски / angliski	[ˈaŋɡliski]	'English'	Occurs as an allophone of /n/ before /k/ and /ɡ/.
Malay	Malaysian and Indonesian	bangun / باڠون	[ˈbaŋʊn]	'wake up'	
Malay	Kelantan-Pattani	sini	[si.niŋ]	'here'	See Kelantan-Pattani Malay
Malay	Terengganu	ayam	[a.jaŋ]	'chicken'	See Terengganu Malay
Malayalam		മാങ്ങ / maanga /مٰاۼَ	[maːŋŋɐ]	'mango'	See Malayalam phonology
Mandarin	Standard	北京 / Běijīng	[peɪ˨˩tɕiŋ˥]	'Beijing'	Restricted to the syllable coda. See Mandarin phonology
Mandarin	Sichuanese	我 / ngo^{3}	[ŋɔ˨˩]	'I'	
Marathi		रंग / ranga	[rəŋə]	'colour'	See Marathi phonology
Mari		еҥ / eng	[jeŋ]	'human'	
Minangkabau		mangarasau	[mäŋäräsäu̯]	'nonsense'	
Mongolian		тэнгэр / teŋger	[teŋger]	'sky'	
Nepali		नङ / nang	[nʌŋ]	'nail'	See Nepali phonology
Nganasan		ӈаӈ / ngang	[ŋaŋ]	'mouth'	
Nivkh		ңамг / ngamg	[ŋamɡ]	'seven'	
North Frisian	Mooring	kåchelng	[ˈkɔxəlŋ]	'stove'	
Northern Min		外 / ngui	[ŋui]	'outside'	
Northern Sámi	Eastern Finnmark	maŋis	[mɒːŋiːs]	'behind'	
Northern Sámi	Western Finnmark	máŋga	[mɑːŋˑka]	'many'	[ŋ] has merged with [ɲ] in Western Finnmark, except before velar stops.
Norwegian		gang	[ɡɑŋ]	'hallway'	See Norwegian phonology
Odia		ଏବଂ / ebang	[ebɔŋ]	'and'	
Okinawan		nkai	[ŋkai]	'to'	Allophone of [n] before velars, before consonants in an onset cluster, and also word-finally in some dialects.
Ottoman Turkish		یڭی / yeŋi	[jeŋi]	'new'	
Panjabi	Gurmukhi	ਰੰਗ / rang	[rəŋ]	'color'	
Panjabi	Shahmukhi	رنگ / rang	[rəŋ]	'color'	
Persian	Iranian	رنگ / rang	[ræŋg]	'color'	Allophone of /n/ before velar plosives. See Persian phonology
Pipil		nemanha	[nemaŋa]	'later'	
Polish		bank	[bäŋk]	'bank'	Allophone of /n/ before /k, ɡ, x/; post-palatal before /kʲ, ɡʲ/. See Polish phonology
Portuguese		manga	[ˈmɐ̃(ŋ)ɡɐ]	'mango'	Occurs occasionally in slow, careful speech, as an allophone of /n/ before /ɡ/ and /k/, when the speaker does not delete the /n/ by fusing it with the preceding vowel.
Occitan	Provençal	vin	[viŋ]	'wine'	
Rapanui		hanga	[haŋa]	'bay'	Sometimes written ⟨g⟩ in Rapanui
Romanian	Țara Moților Transylvanian	câine	['kɨŋi]	'dog'	Corresponds to [n] in standard Romanian. See Romanian phonology
Romanian	Standard	lung	['luŋg]	'long'	Allophone of /n/ before /k, g, h/. See Romanian phonology
Samoan		gagana	[ŋaˈŋana]	'language'	
Serbo-Croatian		stanka / станка	[stâːŋka]	'pause'	Allophone of /n/ before velar plosives. See Serbo-Croatian phonology
Seri		comcáac	[koŋˈkaak]	'Seri people'	
Shona		n'anga	[ŋaŋɡa]	'traditional healer'	
Slovak		banka	[ˈbaŋka]	'bank'	
Slovene		tank	[ˈt̪âːŋk]	'tank'	
Southern Min	Hokkien	黃 / n̂g	[ŋ̍˨˦]	'yellow'	
Southern Min	Teochew	黃 / ng^{5}	[ŋ̍^{55}]	'yellow'	
Spanish	All dialects	domingo	[d̪o̞ˈmĩŋɡo̞]	'Sunday'	Allophone of /n/ before velar consonants. See Spanish phonology
Spanish	Galician Spanish, Andalusian, Canarian, Andean, and most Caribbean dialects	alquitrán	[alkiˈtɾaŋ]	'tar'	Allophone of /n/ in word-final position regardless of what follows.
Swahili		ng'ombe / نݝٗومْبٖ	[ŋombɛ]	'cow'	
Swedish	Standard	ingenting	[ɪŋɛnˈtʰɪŋ]	'nothing'	See Swedish phonology
Swedish	Southern Västerbotten	ngiv	[ˈŋiːv]	'knife'	
Tagalog		nganga	[ŋɐˈŋa]	'opening one's mouth'	
Tamil		இங்கே / in̄gē / يِࢳࢴࣣي	[iŋgeː]	'here'	
Telugu		వాఙ్మయం	[ʋaːŋmajam]	'literature'	Allophone of anuswara when followed by velar stop
Tibetan	Standard	ང / nga	[ŋa˩˧]	'I'	
Thai		งาน / ngaan	[ŋaːn]	'work'	
Nuer - Thok Nath		ŋa	[ŋa]	'who?' or 'Is who?'	
Tongan		tangata	[taŋata]	'man'	
Tuamotuan		rangi / ragi	[raŋi]	'sky'	
Tundra Nenets		ӈэва / ŋəwa	[ŋæewa]	'head'	
Tupi		monhang	[mɔɲaŋ]	'to make'	See Tupian phonology
Turkish		yangın	[jɑŋˈɡɯn̟]	'fire'	Allophone of /n/ before /k/ and /g/
Turkmen		müň / مۆنگ	[myŋ]	'thousand'	
Tyap		nɡɡwon	[ŋɡʷən]	'child'	
Uyghur		مىڭ / ming	[miŋ]	'thousand'	
Uzbek		ming / مینگ	[miŋ]	'thousand'	
Venetian		man	[maŋ]	'hand'	
Vietnamese		ngà	[ŋaː˨˩]	'ivory'	See Vietnamese phonology
Welsh		rhwng	[r̥ʊŋ]	'between'	
West Frisian		kening	[ˈkeːnɪŋ]	'king'	
Wu		五 / ng	[ŋ˩˧]	'five'	
Xhosa		ing'ang'ane	[iŋaŋaːne]	'hadada ibis'	
Xiang		熬 / ngau	[ŋau]	'to boil'	
Yi		ꉢ / nga	[ŋa˧]	'I'	
Yup'ik		ungungssiq	[uŋuŋssiq]	'animal'	
Zapotec	Tilquiapan	yan	[jaŋ]	'neck'	Word-final allophone of lenis /n/

== See also ==
- Index of phonetics articles
- Eng (letter)

== Notes ==
Place →	Labial					Coronal										Dorsal					Laryngeal			
Manner ↓	Bilabial		Labiodental		Linguolabial		Dental		Alveolar		Postalveolar		Retroflex		(Alveolo-)palatal		Velar		Uvular		Pharyngeal/epiglottal		Glottal	
Nasal	m̥	m	ɱ̊	ɱ		n̼	n̪̊	n̪	n̥	n	n̠̊	n̠	ɳ̊	ɳ	ɲ̊	ɲ	ŋ̊	ŋ	ɴ̥	ɴ				
Plosive	p	b	p̪	b̪	t̼	d̼	t̪	d̪	t	d			ʈ	ɖ	c	ɟ	k	ɡ	q	ɢ	ʡ		ʔ	
Sibilant affricate							t̪s̪	d̪z̪	ts	dz	t̠ʃ	d̠ʒ	tʂ	dʐ	tɕ	dʑ								
Non-sibilant affricate	pɸ	bβ	p̪f	b̪v			t̪θ	d̪ð	tɹ̝̊	dɹ̝	t̠ɹ̠̊˔	d̠ɹ̠˔			cç	ɟʝ	kx	ɡɣ	qχ	ɢʁ	ʡʜ	ʡʢ	ʔh	
Sibilant fricative							s̪	z̪	s	z	ʃ	ʒ	ʂ	ʐ	ɕ	ʑ								
Non-sibilant fricative	ɸ	β	f	v	θ̼	ð̼	θ	ð	θ̠	ð̠	ɹ̠̊˔	ɹ̠˔	ɻ̊˔	ɻ˔	ç	ʝ	x	ɣ	χ	ʁ	ħ	ʕ	h	ɦ
Approximant		β̞		ʋ				ð̞		ɹ		ɹ̠		ɻ		j		ɰ						˷
Tap/flap		ⱱ̟		ⱱ					ɾ̥	ɾ			ɽ̊	ɽ						ɢ̆		ʡ̆		
Trill	ʙ̥	ʙ							r̥	r		r̠	ɽ̊r̥	ɽr					ʀ̥	ʀ	ʜ	ʢ		
Lateral affricate									tɬ	dɮ			tꞎ	d𝼅	c𝼆	ɟʎ̝	k𝼄	ɡʟ̝						
Lateral fricative							ɬ̪		ɬ	ɮ			ꞎ	𝼅	𝼆	ʎ̝	𝼄	ʟ̝						
Lateral approximant								l̪	l̥	l		l̠	ɭ̊	ɭ	ʎ̥	ʎ	ʟ̥	ʟ		ʟ̠				
Lateral tap/flap									ɺ̥	ɺ			𝼈̊	𝼈		ʎ̆		ʟ̆						

		BL	LD	D	A	PA	RF	P	V	U
Implosive	Voiced	ɓ			ɗ		ᶑ	ʄ	ɠ	ʛ
Implosive	Voiceless	ɓ̥			ɗ̥		ᶑ̊	ʄ̊	ɠ̊	ʛ̥
Ejective	Stop	pʼ			tʼ		ʈʼ	cʼ	kʼ	qʼ
Ejective	Affricate		p̪fʼ	tθʼ	tsʼ	tʃʼ	tʂʼ	tɕʼ	kxʼ	qχʼ
Ejective	Fricative	ɸʼ	fʼ	θʼ	sʼ	ʃʼ	ʂʼ	ɕʼ	xʼ	χʼ
Ejective	Lateral affricate				tɬʼ			c𝼆ʼ	k𝼄ʼ	q𝼄ʼ
Ejective	Lateral fricative				ɬʼ					
Click (top: velar; bottom: uvular)	Tenuis	kʘ qʘ		kǀ qǀ	kǃ qǃ		k𝼊 q𝼊	kǂ qǂ		
Click (top: velar; bottom: uvular)	Voiced	ɡʘ ɢʘ		ɡǀ ɢǀ	ɡǃ ɢǃ		ɡ𝼊 ɢ𝼊	ɡǂ ɢǂ		
Click (top: velar; bottom: uvular)	Nasal	ŋʘ ɴʘ		ŋǀ ɴǀ	ŋǃ ɴǃ		ŋ𝼊 ɴ𝼊	ŋǂ ɴǂ	ʞ	
Click (top: velar; bottom: uvular)	Tenuis lateral				kǁ qǁ					
Click (top: velar; bottom: uvular)	Voiced lateral				ɡǁ ɢǁ					
Click (top: velar; bottom: uvular)	Nasal lateral				ŋǁ ɴǁ					
