= Piergiorgio Colautti =

Italian artist (1934–2020)

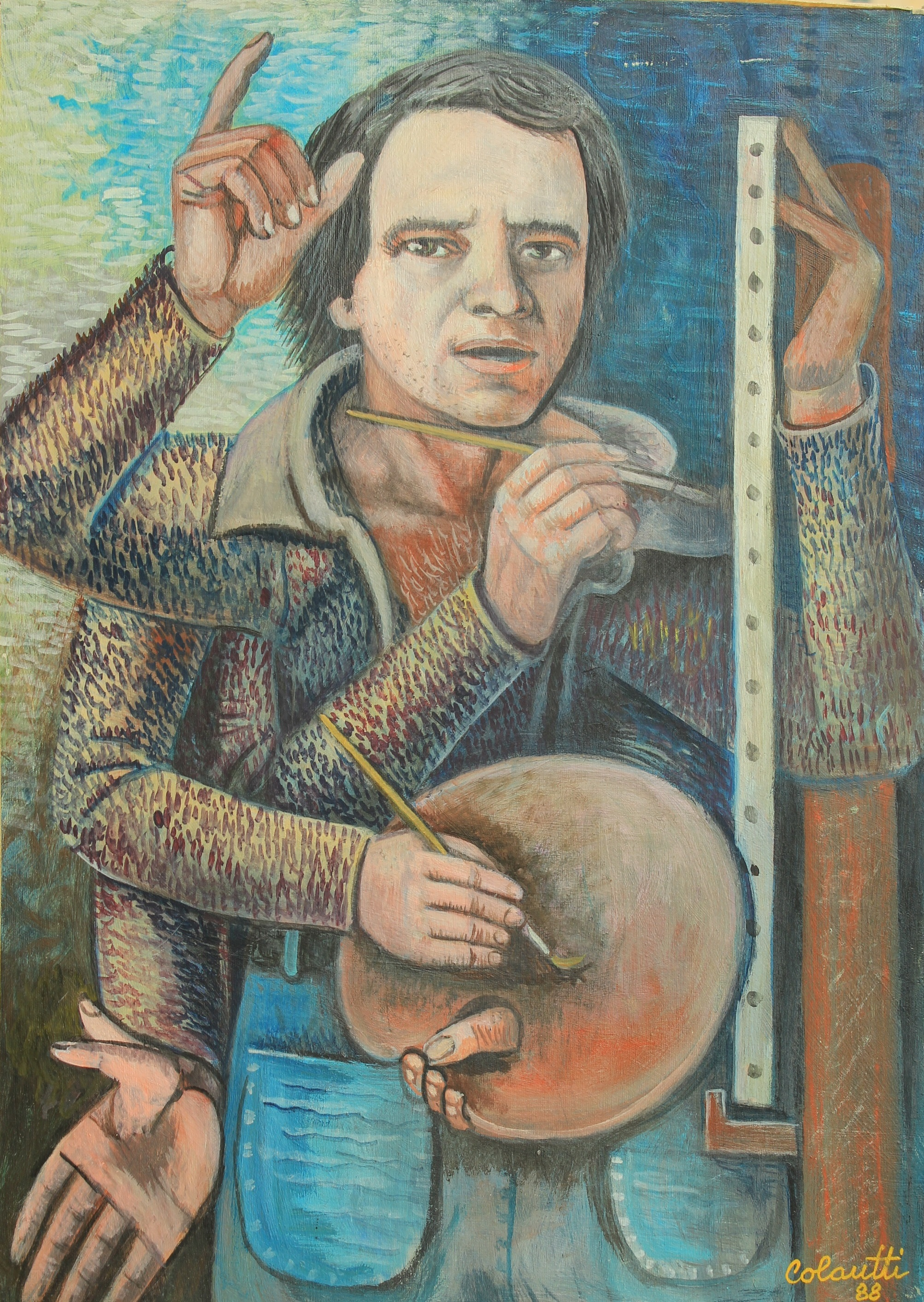
- Self-portrait
- Born: Pio Giorgio Colautti; 16 October 1934 (age 91); Rome, Kingdom of Italy
- Known for: Painting, drawing, sculpture, illustration, lithography, fresco, poetry, journalism
- Movement: Modern art, futurism, surrealism

Piergiorgio Colautti (born 16 October 1934) is an Italian modern painter and sculptor. He is known for his own distinctive style, sometimes labelled "Hyperfuturism", in which figurative elements are enmeshed and submerged by symbols reflecting a cold and modern technological world. He lives and works in Rome.

== Life and work ==
Piergiorgio (Pio Giorgio) Colautti was born in a family of sculptors. When the Second World War began, he moved to Veneto where he attended school of design, worked and socialized with the greatest Venetian painters. His works were first introduced to public as part of the exhibitions in Pordenone, Venice and Mestre. Then he took part in exhibitions held in Ancona and Macerata, where he moved in 1955. In 1958, Colautti returned to Rome where he attended Rome's School of Ornamental Art in Via San Giacomo. At the same time, along with other artists, Colautti presented his works in the exposition of Via Margutta.

In Rome his talent was recognized by Alberto Ziveri, who was his tutor and mentor during 5 years. It was Ziveri who pushed Piergiorgio towards the idea of personal exhibition. His first personal exhibition was held in 1958 at "La Scaletta" art gallery, where the greatest celebrities of the "Roman school" had made their first entry "into society". Colautti has exhibited in France, USA, Italy, Canada, Germany, Great Britain, etc.

Besides paintings, Colautti practices frescoes, wall paintings, lithography and sculptures. Also, being inspired by the works of his famous grandfather, Arturo Colautti, Piergiorgio follows the journalistic path. His articles about the rigors of the professional artist's life were and are still being published by "Inciucio", a low-budget Italian version of People Magazine. In addition, in 1982 his poetry was published in the collection of poems titled "L'altra alternativa"

His works are in many public and private collections in Italy and abroad.

== Exhibitions ==
=== Personal ===
- 1962: Galleria di San Luca – Rome
- 1963: Galleria comunale d'arte moderna e contemporanea – Rome
- 1964: Galleria Porfiri – Rome
- 1965, 1967, 1972: Galleria Secolo XIX – Rome
- 1966: Galleria La Scaletta – Rome
- 1968, 1971: Galleria Il Pozzo – Città di Castello
- 1969: Galleria Tritone al Nazareno – Rome
- 1970: Circolo di Cultura Popolare Monte Sacro – Rome
- 1971: Art Gallery "Ponte Sisto" – Rome
- 1973: Galleria d'arte "Il Trifalco" – Rome
- 1976: Expo New York – New York City
- 1976, 1978: "Circolo Cittadino" – Alba Adriatica
- 1978: "Expo Arte Bari" – Bari
- 1978: Palazzo Comunale San Remo – Sanremo
- 1979: Galleria "Magazzeni" – Giulianova
- 1980: Fiera del Turismo di Stoccarda – Stuttgart in Germany
- 1980, 1982: Galleria "Lo Scanno" – L'Aquila
- 1981: Galleria d'Arte Contemporanea "Studio C" – Rome
- 1983, 1984: Galleria "La Banana" – Martinsicuro
- 1983: Galleria Palazzo Comunale Tortoreto – Tortoreto
- 1985: Galleria "Ghelfi" – Verona
- 1985: Galleria Sistina – Rome
- 1986: Galleria D'Urso – Rome
- 1987: Galleria Comunale Palazzo Esposizioni – Rome
- 1988: Personale Fiera di Roma – Rome
- 1988: Galleria Palazzo Valentini – Rome
- 1989: Castello Cinquecentesco – L'Aquila
- 1990: Galleria d'Arte 28 – Rome
- 1991: Galleria Palazzo Camerale Allumiere – Allumiere in the Province of Rome
- 1992: Associazione Friuli nel Mondo – Rome
- 1994: Galleria Palazzo Camerale Allumiere – Allumiere in the Province of Rome
- 1995: Scuola Comunale Allumiere – Allumiere in the Province of Rome
- 1995: Palazzo del Turismo Terminillo – Rieti
- 1996: Palazzo Comunale Tortoreto Lido – Tortoreto

=== Group ===
- 1963: Galleria Sistina – Rome
- 1964: Mostra Nazionale d'Incisione – Cagliari
- 1964: Mostra Mercato Nazionale d'Arte Contemporanea – Rome
- 1964, 1965: Mostra Concorso Arti Figurative – Rome
- 1965: Exhibition of Fiesole – Fiesole
- 1965: Exhibition of Puccini – Ancona
- 1965: Exhibition of Prato – Prato
- 1966: Exhibition of Pittori Romani – Arezzo
- 1966: Galleria D'Urso – Rome
- 1967: Exhibition of ACLI, Galleria Comunale – Rome
- 1967: Galleria Laurina – Rome
- 1967-1972: Permanente Galleria Scaligera – Montecatini Terme
- 1967-1972: Exhibition in Città di Castello
- 1969: Exhibition in Salsomaggiore Terme
- 1969: Exhibition of Italian painters – Canada
- 1969: Exhibition of Italian Landscape – New York City
- 1969: Collective Contemporary Painters – Avignon, Paris, Marseille
- 1969: Biennale d'Arte Contemporanea – Monterotondo
- 1971: Exhibition of Mario Sironi – Naples
- 1971: Collective Contemporary Painters – Fiera Milano – Milan
- 1971: National Exhibition in Prato
- 1971: National Exhibition in Cavazzo Carnico – Modena
- 1972: Exhibition "Natale oggi" – Rome
- 1972: Esposizione Internazionale Canina – Sanremo
- 1972: Mostra firme celebri – Alassio
- 1972: Art Gallery "Ponte Sisto" – Rome
- 1972: Exhibition in Cortina d'Ampezzo
- 1972: Exhibition of Rotaract Club – Lucca
- 1972: Exhibition of Grafica – Arezzo
- 1972: Exhibition in Santa Margherita Ligure
- 1977: "Omaggio a San Francesco nel 750 anniversario della morte" – Assisi
- 1977, 1978: "Festival nazionale d'Arte Grafica" – Salerno
- 1978: Premio "Siena" – Siena
- 1978: VI Biennale d'Arte Palazzo Reale – Milan
- 1979: Mostra "Lazio 79" – Rome
- 1979: Mostra "Premio Spoleto" – Spoleto
- 1979: Mostra "Premio Norcia" – Norcia
- 1979: Premio "Unicef" – Galleria "Capricorno" – Rome
- 1979: "La donna nell'Arte" – Galleria "Capricorno" – Rome
- 1979: "Arte Giovane, Resistenza, Attualità" – Domodossola
- 1980: "Arte e Ferrovia" – Bologna
- 1981, 1989, 1992: "Premio Salvi" – piccola Europa – Sassoferrato (AN)
- 1982: "Expo di Bari" – Bari
- 1982, 1985: "Expo Tevere" – Rome
- 1984: "Expo Arte" – Bari, Basel and in New York City
- 1983: "III Biennale d'Arte" – La Spezia
- 1984: "VI Biennale d Arte Palazzo Reale" – Milan
- 1985: "VII Biennale d'Arte" – Gabrovo, Bulgaria
- 1985: Premio Santià – Santhià
- 1985: Arte e Satira Politica – Gabrovo, Bulgaria
- 1986: Arte e Umorismo nell'Arte – Tolentino
- 1987: "V Biennale d'Arte" – La Spezia
- 1988: Mostra Nazionale D'Arte Santià – Santhià
- 1990: Festival della Satira Politica – Gabrovo, Bulgaria
- 1991: XV Biennale Internazionale dell'Umorismo nell'Arte Tolentino – Tolentino
- 1992: Triennale Internazionale Scultura Osaka – Osaka, Japan
- 1993: Triennale Internazionale Pittura Osaka – Osaka, Japan
- 1994: Galleria "Magazzeni" – Giulianova
- 1995: Galleria d'Arte Contemporanea "Studio C" – Rome
- Quadriennale d'Arte di Roma – Rome
- Mostra Nazionale Cavasso – Modena
- Mostra (Asta) Finarte – Milan

== Artworks in museums ==
=== Italy ===
- Omaggio a San Francesco nel 350 della pinacoteca di Assisi
- Museum Ebraico di Arte Contemporanea – Rome
- Museum Agostinelli – Acilia (Rome)
- Museum Madonna del Divino Amore (Rome)
- Pinacoteca dell'Antoniano – Bologna
- Alassio – Muretto degli artisti
- Pinacoteca Comune di Albano di Lucania – Potenza
- Museum della Resistenza di Domodossola – Novara
- Museum della Pinacoteca Comunale – Roseto degli Abruzzi (Teramo)
- Museum della Pinacoteca Comunale di Giulianova – Teramo
- Pinacoteca del Comune di Tortoreto – Teramo
- Pinacoteca del Comune de L'Aquila
- Pinacoteca del Comune di Tolentino – Macerata
- Pinacoteca del Comune di Rieti
- Pinacoteca di Arte contemporanea di Povoleto (Udine)

=== Abroad ===
- House of Humor and Satire in Gabrovo – Bulgaria
- Bertrand Russell Foundation Art Gallery – Cambridge University (Great Britain)
- Folk Traditions Museum of Bucovina – Romania
- Staatsgalerie Stuttgart – Germany

== Selected awards ==
- 1963: Premio Targa D'Argento come fondatore del gruppo Gli Ellittici
- 1968: Award, Montecatini Terme
- 1969: Award and gold medal, Salsomaggiore Terme
- 1970: Mostra Collettiva, Parco dei Principi – Rome
- 1970: Gold Medal, Fiano Romano
- 1972: Silver Medal, P. Schweitzer – Modena
- 1973: Gold Medal, Comune di Cortina d'Ampezzo – Cortina d'Ampezzo
- 2012: Premio Van Gogh, Accademia Delle Avanguardie Artistiche – Palermo

== Quotes and criticism comments ==
- Gaetano Maria Bonifati
- Maurizio Calvesi
- Virgilio Guzzi
- Stanislao Nievo
- Mario Penelope
- Guido Della Martora
- Mario Monteverdi
- Ugo Moretti
- Gianni Gaspari (TG2)
- Duilio Morosini
- Sergio Massimo Greci
- Mario Forti (GR3)
- Anna Iozzino
- C. Norelli
- Augusto Giordano
- De Roberti
- Vittorio Adorno
- Francesco Boneschi
- Federico Menna
- S. Di Dionisio
- P.A. De Martino
- Giulio Salierno
- Elio Mercuri
- Dario Micacchi

== Bibliography ==
- Who's who in German: Biographisches Kompendium in deutscher Sprache, Schellmann, 1999, ISBN 3-931230-09-0, page 273
- L'elite 2001, selezione Arte italiana, page 386
- L'elite 2004, selezione Arte italiana, page 382
- L'elite 2008, selezione Arte italiana, page 386
- L'elite 2010, selezione Arte italiana, page 310
- L'elite 2011, selezione Arte italiana, page 314
- L'elite 2012, selezione Arte italiana, page 284
- Ente nazionale manifestazione d'arte, un anno d'arte, Fabbri editori, 1986, page 293
- Piergiorgio Colautti: proposte e ricerca estetica: opere dal 1957 al 1977, Piergiorgio Colautti, 1977
- Catalogo Bolaffi d'arte moderna, il collezionista d'arte moderna, volume 1, 1970, page 134
- 50 anni di friuli a Roma, Regione Autonoma Friuli Venezia Giulia, 2002, page 129
- ARTE e Collezionismo 2012, Gallery Edition, volume XI, page 417
- ARTE e Collezionismo 2013, Gallery Edition, volume XII, page 188
- XV Biennale Internazionale Dell'umorismo nell'arte, Tolentino 1989, page 65
- XL Rassegna D'arte, G.B. Salvi e piccolo Europa, 1990, page 34
- Al Friuli vicino, Piero Isola, 2003, ISBN 88-8247-116-0, Vecchiarelli Editore, page 10, 72-73
- Ciao 2001, No.29, 1975, page 61
- MID TIMES, Volume 3, No. 35, May 1980, page 67
- Fogolar Furlan di Roma, Anno XL – Luglio – Dicembre 2009 – No.2, page 31
- Polska w Europie, No. 5-7, 1984, page 30
- Art Leader, Anno II, No. 1, Gennaio-Febbraio 1992, page 57
- Il Poliedro, rassegna d'arte, Marzo/Aprile 1985, Anno XX, page 34
- Piccola Industria, No. 7-8, Lulgio-Agosto 1984, page 68
- Omnibus Magazine, No. 4, Settembre 2003, page 29
- Omnibus Magazine, No. 3, Luglio-Agosto 2003, page 14
- Omnibus Magazine, No. 5, Novembre 2003, page 8
- Sport Grand Prix Auto, No. 2, Febbraio 1979, page 23
- Farnesearte, Mensile d'arte e, Anno II, No.7-8, Luglio-Agosto 1989, page 18
- La Madonna della Splendore, No. 17, 22 Aprile 1998, page 1, 3
- La realita' dell'invisibile, 4-8 Luglio 2007, page 23
