= Láá Láá Bwamu language =

Gur language of Burkina Faso

Láá Láá Bwamu
- Bwamu laa, yere, kàdenbà, asKàdenbà
- Region: Burkina Faso
- Ethnicity: Bwa
- Native speakers: (69,000 cited 2000)
- Language family: Niger–Congo?: Atlantic–Congo; Gur; Northern Gur; Bwa; Láá Láá Bwamu
- Writing system: Latin

Language codes
- ISO 639-3: bwj
- Glottolog: laal1241

Láá Láá Bwamu, also known as Bwamu laa, yere, kàdenbà or asKàdenbà, is a Gur language of Burkina Faso. It is one of the few languages that has the velar nasal as its only nasal consonant.
