= L'Idea =

American magazine in Italian and English

- First issue: 1974
- Country: Brooklyn, New York
- Language: Italian, English

L'Idea is a quarterly bilingual magazine in Italian and English, published continuously in Brooklyn, New York since 1974.

== History ==
"Founded as the official magazine of New York's Circolo Culturale di Mola di Bari ... The magazine has continued to grow and improve ... becoming a solid point of reference to the Italian community in America." "L'Idea, directed by Leonardo Campanile, was distributed free to anyone who requests it: a tradition since 1974, repeated year after year, that transformed what once was just a large journal(broadsheet format) into a magazine that is widely distributed and has received numerous awards ...", with 48-60 pages, tabloid format and full color. L'Idea was used as the official newsletter for the Italian community by the Italian Consulate of New York."The magazine funded and sponsored many cultural and social activities for the Italian community, including the yearly Miss Puglia USA and Miss L'Idea competitions. Winners received scholarships... Tiziano Thomas Dossena assumed the role of Editorial Director in 1990 ... L'Idea had administrative offices in Brooklyn for 39 years, until it stopped its paper version", becoming an online magazine. The magazine received the '2012 Globo Tricolore International Award', "similar to an Oscar for famous Italians abroad who are unknown in their homeland... for its almost forty years at the service of the Italian community in America."

== Journalists ==
In the magazine, there have been many reputable and renowned Italian and Italian American writers and journalists, such as Tiziano Thomas Dossena (an Italian American author and publisher from Yonkers), Robert Viscusi (a fellow of the National Endowment for the Humanities, of the John D. Calandra Italian American Institute and president of the Italian American Writers Association), Anthony Julian Tamburri, Patrizia Di Franco, Federico Tosti (1898–2001), "known romanesco poet". LindaAnn Loschiavo, the English section director is a recognized "poet, reviewer, and dramatist". The magazine, also known as L'Idea Magazine, has been directed by Leonardo Campanile for over twenty years.
