= Cwi Bwamu language =

Gur language spoken in Burkina Faso

Cwi Bwamu
- Bwamu Twĩ
- Region: Burkina Faso
- Ethnicity: Bwa, Tara
- Native speakers: (24,000 cited 1999)
- Language family: Niger–Congo?: Atlantic–Congo; Gur; Northern Gur; Bwa; Cwi Bwamu

Language codes
- ISO 639-3: bwy
- Glottolog: cwib1235

Cwi Bwamu, or simply Cwi (Twĩ), is a Gur language of Burkina Faso.
