= LindaAnn Loschiavo =

American journalist

LindaAnn LoSchiavo (also spelled Linda Ann Lo Schiavo) is an American freelance journalist, poet, and dramatist from New York City.

Her poetry has been published in many journals and anthologies, including Wild Dreams: The Best of Italian Americana (Fordham University Press, 2009). She has also written plays, including Courting Mae West (2004) and a documentary film on Texas Guinan.

She is the editor of the English-language section of L'Idea magazine.

One of her poetry collections, published in December 2019 but released in 2020, is "A Route Obscure and Lonely" by LindaAnn LoSchiavo [Wapshott Press, December 30, 2019; 60 pages; format: paperback or kindle]. The publisher of Wapshott Press, Ginger Mayerson, described this SFF collection: Haunting and harrowing in its portrayal of supernatural creatures, "A Route Obscure and Lonely" explores the road less traveled by restless ghosts, sexually curious aliens, cunning vampires, transgressive angels, regretful mermaids, defiant witches, surly goddesses, mysterious phantoms, fearless fortune tellers, and "goth's Mr. Goodbar" himself—Edgar Allan Poe.

Critic Sandra Lindow reviewed "A Route Obscure and Lonely" for the SpecPo Blog. Sandra Lindow's opening paragraphs were set to music in this video: https://www.youtube.com/watch?v=LqxqYbquJHE

In October 2021, "A Route Obscure and Lonely" took third place an Elgin Award from the Science Fiction Poetry Society.

Another title released in 2020 is an erotic poetry chapbook available as a 34-page paperback. "Concupiscent Consumption" by LindaAnn LoSchiavo [Red Ferret Press, Feb. 4, 2020] was described by poet Molly Peacock this way: "Why should I teach old memories to talk?" bold poet LindaAnn LoSchiavo asks, and her poems of Eros shout out the many answers. From the child whose cheeks are pinched by her Italian family, to the teenager's makeout sessions, from figs (both symbolic and real), to Jayne Mansfield (all too real and yet symbolic), the candid lines of LoSchiavo's Concupiscent Consumption examine the urges of a young woman seeking to define her sexuality as well as her culture. The young woman in her times—at once liberated and restricted—refracts in the lens of the savvy poet looking back on how her womanhood was formed.

Amazon URL: "Concupiscent Consumption" by LindaAnn LoSchiavo on Amazon Books

A book review for "Concupiscent Consumption" can be found here: Toreador Magazine: "Concupiscent Consumption" -- reviewed by Jesse Dictor, Toreador Magazine

As the granddaughter of Italian immigrants, LoSchiavo is often grouped with "Italian-American poets" but she does not focus on issues of Italian-American identity. She often writes formal verse. In his essay, "What is Italian American Poetry?" Dana Gioia writes that contemporary Italian-American poets such as Loschiavo have "a heightened consciousness of their European Latin roots" and unlike many other American poets do not reflexively reject European influences; as a result, their work demonstrates an "unself-conscious sophistication."

Her full-length poetry collection "Apprenticed to the Night" (U.K.: Universe Press, 2024) has won three awards in February 2025.

LindaAnn LoSchiavo’s Apprenticed to the Night Receives Accolades and Global Acclaim.

LindaAnn LoSchiavo’s Apprenticed to the Night has received the BREW Seal of Excellence from The Chrysalis BREW Project, the Spotlyts Story Award from Spotlyts Magazine, as well as recognition from Book World Front.

https://nbc-6.com/press-release/2025-02-17/16040/lindaann-loschiavo-s-apprenticed-to-the-night-receives-accolades-and-global-acclaim

https://central.newschannelnebraska.com/story/52406252/lindaann-loschiavos-apprenticed-to-the-night-receives-accolades-and-global-acclaim

https://ground.news/article/lindaann-loschiavos-apprenticed-to-the-night-receives-accolades-and-global-acclaim-cloud-pr-wire

Her YouTube channel is called "LindaAnn Literary" -- https://www.youtube.com/channel/UCHm1NZIlTZybLTFA44wwdfg?view_as=subscriber
