= Mola di Bari =

- Comune
- Comune di Mola di Bari
- Aerial view of Mola di Bari

- Coat of arms

- Location within Italy Location within Apulia
- Coordinates: 41°4′N 17°5′E
- Country: Italy
- Region: Apulia
- Metropolitan city: Bari (BA)
- Frazioni: Cozze, San Materno

Government
  - Mayor: Paola Maria Bianca Schettini (commissar)

Area
  - Total: 50.94 km^{2} (19.67 sq mi)
- Elevation: 5 m (16 ft)

Population (1 January 2017)
  - Total: 25,554
  - Density: 501.6/km^{2} (1,299/sq mi)
- Demonym: Molesi
- Time zone: UTC+1 (CET)
  - Summer (DST): UTC+2 (CEST)
- Postal code: 70042
- Dialing code: 080
- Patron saint: St. Michael; Our Lady of Sorrows
- Website: Official website

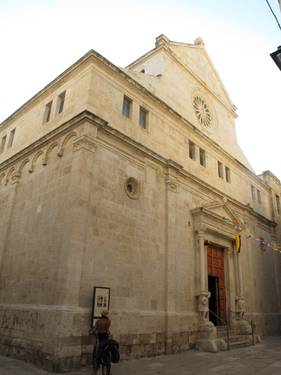
Cathedral.

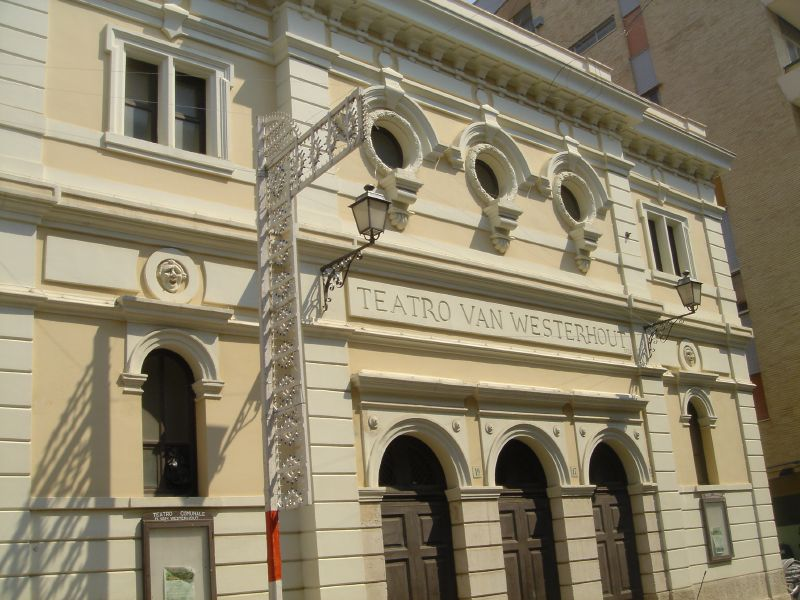
Teatro van Westerhout.

Mola di Bari, commonly referred to simply as Mola (Barese: Màule), is a town and comune of the Metropolitan City of Bari, in the region of Apulia, in Southern Italy, on the Adriatic Sea.

In recent times, the town was best known for having primarily whitewashed buildings, however, growth, modern construction, and building design have changed the image significantly, particularly in the northern (and more modern) part of the town.

Mola's city center is its main piazza, Piazza XX Settembre near the port and it also boasts a church (Chiesa Matrice, i.e. Mother Church) dating back to the 13th century.

Bakeries in Mola are known for their focaccia food. Until the early 1990s, there were two privately owned public firewood ovens available to the inhabitants of Mola, one located on Via Nino Bixio, on the southern part of the town, and the other located on Via Pesce, on the opposite side of the main Piazza. These businesses served the local residents by providing a place to cook baked goods, primarily focaccia and breads. Typically, focaccia pans were quite large (some approaching half a meter in diameter) and were difficult to cook in one's home. The tradition of sending items to be baked by the local oven has passed.

Mola is also home to a large fishing industry that supplies fresh fish throughout the southern Italian region.

== History ==
The old settlement of Neolithic people is confirmed by some archaeological remains. The origin of the city is not known entirely because of lack of sufficient traces to assert a Greek origin (coins now dispersed, with an old emblem showing the symbol of Athens) or Roman (with a Roman villa of the imperial period close to the northern coast and the remains of a water tank). The proof of the existence of an urban settlement remains scarce and contradictory up until 1277, when Charles I of Anjou ordered the reconstruction of the city along with the building of city walls, a church, and a castle.

After its re-foundation by Charles of Anjou in the 13th century, Mola then passed its ups and downs and retained the status of city-state, almost continually, until the early fifteenth century. According to some local historians, this was a period of relative prosperity for the town, whose population recorded a significant increase. Virtually painless was the descent in Southern Italy of the Hungarian army of Louis I in 1348, to whom the local population immediately declared fidelity, saving the place from being looted, as it happened to other neighboring centres.

With the passage of the Kingdom of Naples from the Angevins to the Crown of Aragon, the indebtedness of the Crown determined the sale of state property to the creditors. Mola thus lost the status of a free city-state and was subjected to different feudal lords: the Gesualdo from 1417, the Maramaldo from 1435 and the Toraldo from 1464.

In 1495, with the arrival in Italy of Charles VIII of France to claim the Kingdom of Naples, Mola, along with other ports in Apulia, was ceded by the Aragonese to the Republic of Venice, in exchange for a huge loan. Venice attacked the city repeatedly but was never able to conquer the city castle, which remained loyal to Naples. With the period of Venetian rule, which lasted until 1530, Mola strengthened ties with the other side of the Adriatic and recorded an overall economic progress.

Back again under the Toraldo family, the city then passed to the Carafa, and in 1584 the people from Mola managed to collect the considerable sum of 50,000 ducats, which allowed them to break free from the feudal yoke to be subject only to the royal property. Soon, however, the estate was bought by Antonio Carafa, who a few years later was forced to sell it at auction to pay his debts.

It was only in 1670 when Mola was finally able to get rid of remnants of feudal power and to restore its original status within the Kingdom of Naples.

== Main sights ==
=== Angevin Castle ===
In order to defend the coast from pirate raids, together with the rebuilding of the town by its walls, Charles I of Anjou in 1277 ordered the construction of a palacium, entrusting the direction of the work to the famous royal carpenters Pierre d'Angicourt and Jean from Toul. The project was completed two years later. Between the fifteenth and sixteenth centuries the building followed the fate of the town and passed through the hands of various feudal lords, resisting numerous attacks without ever being taken. However the considerable damage with the Venetian siege of 1508 imposed a radical restoration, which took place a few years later on a military project by architect Evangelista Menga, who gave it its current form of star polygon. The mighty walls scarp, built in order to withstand an attack with firearms, were still equipped with numerous trap doors. A moat surrounded the building and communicated with the sea, while the castle was connected to the city walls by means of a bridge.

=== Cathedral ===
Dedicated to St. Nicholas of Bari, it is located inside the old town, not far from the sea. Built in the late thirteenth century, presumably during the re-founding of the city by the Anjou, it was already in very poor condition in the sixteenth century. The Archbishop of Bari Girolamo Sauli therefore requested its reconstruction, which took place in the years 1547–1575 through the work of Dalmatian masters Francesco and Giovanni from Šibenik and John from Korcula. The building is a fine example of Adriatic Renaissance, although the Baroque extensions have altered the appearance of the apse and some chapels. Recent renovations have enhanced the rose window and the two portals, the Lions (on the left side) and Dwarfs bearing the door columns (in front). The interior space is divided into three naves, the lateral ones with vaults that characterize the overall style and the imposing Corinthian columns.

=== Other sights ===
- Mother Church, dedicated to St. Nicholas of Bari
- Church of Santa Maria del Passo in Sant'Antonio di Padova
- Church of Santissimo Rosario in San Domenico
- Palazzo Roberti-Alberotanza (18th century)
- Teatro van Westerhout (1888)

== Twin towns ==
Mola di Bari is twinned with:

- Tivat, Montenegro, since 1969
- Pedrajas de San Esteban, Spain, since 2012
- Bomporto, Italy, since 2013
- (United States) Auburn, Washington USA, since 2016

== People ==
- Niccolò van Westerhout (Mola di Bari, 1857 – Naples, 1898), musician and composer
- Anton Muscatelli (born 1962), economist and university president

== See also ==
- Mola di Bari railway station
