= Bwa languages =

Branch of the Gur languages

Bwa
- Bwamu; Bobo Wule
- Geographic distribution: Burkina Faso, Mali
- Ethnicity: Bwa
- Linguistic classification: Niger–Congo?: Atlantic–Congo; Gur; Northern Gur; Bwa
- Subdivisions: Bwamu (Ouarkoye); Láá Láá Bwamu; Cwi Bwamu (Bwamu Twi); Bomu

Language codes
- Glottolog: bwam1247

The Bwa languages (Bwamu, Bomu) are a branch of the Gur languages spoken by over half a million Bwa people of Burkina Faso and Mali.

The Bwa people, and their languages, are one of several called Bobo in Bambara. The Bwa are distinguished as the Bobo Wule/Oule "Red Bobo". The Bwa languages are not mutually intelligible; Ethnologue calculates that the intelligibility of the Ouarkoye and Cwi is 30%, though other varieties are closer.

== Languages ==
- Bwamu (Ouarkoye)
- Láá Láá Bwamu
- Cwi Bwamu (Bwamu Twi)
- Bomu
