= Tiziano Thomas Dossena =

Italian American author and art critic

- Born: September 19, 1952; Milan, Lombardy, Italy
- Occupations: art critic, author, journalist
- Relatives: Emilio Giuseppe Dossena, father
- Writing career
- Language: Italian, English

Tiziano Thomas Dossena is an Italian American author and art critic.

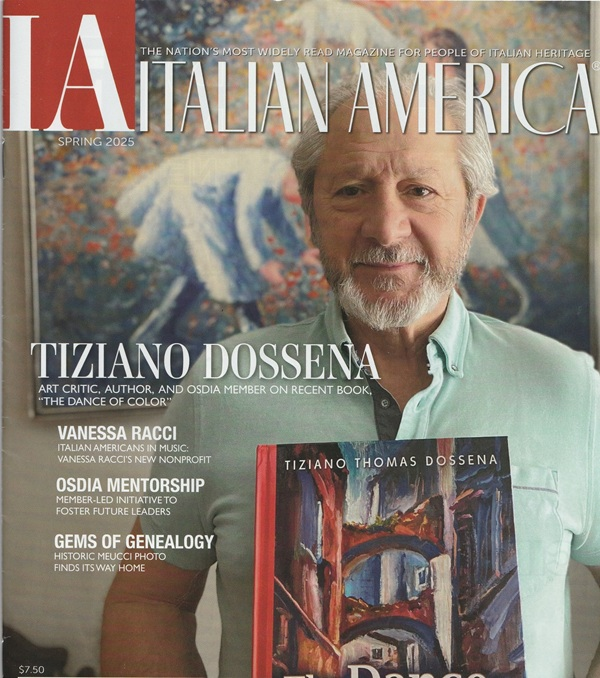

== Biography ==
Born in Milan on 19 September 1952, Tiziano Thomas Dossena moved to the United States in 1968 and completed his studies in that country, where he graduated in Italian Literature (Queens College, 1976), Humanistic Studies (Regents College, 1977), Environmental Science (Purchase College, 1992) and Engineering Technology (New York City Technical College, 1995). Repatriated to Italy in 1978, Dossena devoted himself to theater and poetry, attending at the same time the Faculty of Medicine.

Articles, essays, poems, and interviews of Dossena were published in numerous magazines and anthologies in Italy, France, Greece, Switzerland and the United States. In 1990 he assumed the role of Editorial Director of the L'Idea Magazine (Brooklyn, NY) and contributor to USA Bridge Apulia (Lecce), Tiziano Thomas Dossena has represented the Italian community in the Italian Government as Consigliere (1998–2004) and Secretary (1998–2000) of COM.IT.ES. (Committee of Italians Abroad) in New York and Connecticut. The dynamic writer and art critic, the son of the famous artist Emilio Giuseppe Dossena, also contributed to the virtual magazine Racconti e Letteratura with a series of articles on the life of Italians in New York. Dossena is the founder and Editor-in-chief of two online opera magazines, OperaMylove.com (in English) and OperaAmorMio (in Italian).

== Critics' comments ==
- "His poetry is vibrant with human ideals and feelings that well harmonize the high ideals with the melody of the verse"
- "Dossena's poems breathe pure air and endless blue skies and while interwoven with high social content, capture the tears of men and the beauty of the cosmos in a blend of rich harmonies "
- " His poetry model is based on the vivacity of youthful feelings, well framed aesthetically and structurally sound, although admirable, daring and stormy "
- Regarding the story "The philosopher", Renata Morresi wrote: "Do not miss this little cult: an eco-thriller with political fiction developments, written with style tight and incisive, full of suspense, and above all irony, irony, irony."
- "Tiziano Thomas Dossena, who has lived for years in the United States, is the author of interesting essays and winner, among other things, of the first prize for journalism Emigrazione"
- "Caro Fantozzi[...]is not an icy and anodyne summa of his works, but a delicate mixture of feelings. A collection of short stories, embellished by the fil rouge of feelings, emotions, sentiments, precisely, the singularity of which, whether it's fiction, creative writing and imagination, or "tranche de vie" therefore "real life", is the clever narrative (among other things never subdued or tedious): a mix of finesse d'esprit, irony and self-mockery (how little irony is worth, if it is not capable of smiling and making people smile?), divertissement, reflection, introspection, split-soaked existential pain, joy, loss, nostalgia, spleen, melancholy, happiness, bewilderment, despair, rebirth."

== Awards ==
Dossena has won many awards and records of merit, both for poetry and for fiction, including the first prize for essays "De Finibus Terrae", the first prize "Coppa del Mare", Prize for Fiction "Citta` di Modica", the top prize for journalism "Emigrazione", the second prize "Voci Nostre" in poetry, the second prize for poetry "Noi e Gli Altri" and the third prize for poetry at the "Biennale di Boniprati". Winner of the 2012 Globo Tricolore Award, similar to an Oscar for famous Italians abroad who are unknown in their homeland. Dossena was the winner of the prestigious "Sons of Italy Literary award" in 2019. In 2021, he received the Lifetime Achievement Award from the Italian Charities of America and the Albert Nelson Marquis Lifetime Achievement Award from the “Marquis Who’s Who.”

=== Member of ===
- New York Academy of Science
- Accademia Tiberina (Italy)
- Accademia dei Bronzi (Italy)
- Accademia Marconi (Italy)
- Haute Académie française (France)
- Académie des Marches (France)
- Grupo de Literario O'Jornal de Felgueiras (Portugal )
- Dossena is also Knight of the Accademia Citta` di Modica.

== Literary works ==
- Caro Fantozzi (in Italian). New York: Scriptum Press, December 2008. ISBN 978-0-9795213-4-8.
- Giovanna Ungaro, Leonardo Campanile and Tiziano Thomas Dossena Puer Centum Annorum - Don Bruno Aloia.(In Italian) New York:Idea Publications, November 2009. ISBN 978-0-9825373-1-2.
- Leonardo Campanile and Tiziano Thomas Dossena, Doña Flor, The Opera by van Westerhout (in Italian and English). New York: Idea Publications, April 2010. ISBN 978-0-9825373-2-9
- Sunny Days and Sleepless Nights, (in Italian and English), Port St. Lucie, FL: Idea Press, December 2016. ISBN 978-0-972124386
- Leonardo Campanile and Tiziano Thomas Dossena, "Fortunio (Rediscovered Opera Series)" (in Italian and English), Port St. Lucie, FL: Idea Press, May 2020. ISBN 978-1948651134
- Leonardo Campanile and Tiziano Thomas Dossena, Colomba (Rediscovered Opera Series) (in Italian and English), Port St. Lucie, FL: Idea Press, May 2020. ISBN 978-1948651158
- Leonardo Campanile and Tiziano Thomas Dossena, Cimbelino (Rediscovered Opera Series) (in Italian and English), Port St. Lucie, FL: Idea Press, May 2020. ISBN 978-1948651127
- Leonardo Campanile and Tiziano Thomas Dossena, Doña Flor (Rediscovered Opera Series) (in Italian and English), Port St. Lucie, FL: Idea Press, May 2020. ISBN 978-1948651141
- Tiziano Thomas Dossena et al, A Feast of Narrative (Volume 1), An Anthology of Short stories and Creative Nonfiction by Italian American Writers, Port St. Lucie, FL: Idea Press, February 2020. ISBN 979-8602026511
- The World as an Impression: The Landscapes of Emilio Giuseppe Dossena (in English and Italian), Port St. Lucie, FL: Idea Press, August 2020. ISBN 978-1948651165
- Tiziano Thomas Dossena et al, A Feast of Narrative (Volume 2), An Anthology of Short stories by Italian American Writers, Port St. Lucie, FL: Idea Press, September 2020. ISBN 978-1-948651-17-2
- Tiziano Thomas Dossena et al, A Feast of Narrative (Volume 3), An Anthology of Short stories by Italian American Writers, Port St. Lucie, FL: Idea Press, November 2020. ISBN 978-1948651-18-9
- Federico Tosti, Poeta Antiregime, (in Italian), Port St. Lucie, FL: Idea Press, August 2021. ISBN 978-1948651271
- La Danza del Colore. La vita e le opere di Emilio Giuseppe Dossena, (in Italian), Port St. Lucie, FL: Idea Press, February 2023. ISBN 978-1948651424
- The Dance of Color. The Life and Works of Emilio Giuseppe Dossena, Port St. Lucie, FL: Idea Press, November 2023. ISBN 978-1948651493
- Federico Tosti e la Montagna, (in Italian), Port St. Lucie, FL: Idea Press, December 2024. ISBN 978-1948651677

== Articles on Dossena ==
"Role Reversal: Assemblymen Honored to Meet Local Author" Edouard VBoulat, Bronxville.patch.com, June 27, 2011

"Italian Author Recognized by the NYS Assembly" Italian American Journal, July 7, 2011, page 4

"Tiziano Thomas Dossena onorato dalla NYS Assembly" Riccardo Chioni, America Oggi, July 6, 2011

"9/11 plaque unveiled in Yonkers" Newsday, September 9, 2012

"More from Yonkers' September 11 Remembrance", Yonkers Rising, September 28, 2012, page 9

"June 21st, 2019 Declared Tiziano Thomas Dossena Day In Yonkers" We The Italians, June 21, 2019

"Tiziano Thomas Dossena Wins The 2019 OSIA LITERARY AWARD!" Queensledger, June 10, 2019

"Eye on Eastchester: Tiziano Thomas Dossena," Eastchester Neighbors, January 2025, page 14

"Going Beyond the Words: an Interview with Tiziano Thomas Dossena," Italian America, Spring 2025, pages-3-9
