= Arturo Colautti =

Dalmatian Italian journalist, polemicist and librettist

Arturo Colautti

Arturo Colautti (Zara, 9 October 1851 – Rome, 9 November 1914) was a Dalmatian Italian journalist, polemicist and librettist. He was a strong supporter of Italian irredentism for his native Dalmatia.

== Biography ==
=== Youth in Dalmatia ===
Born in Zara, Austrian Empire, the youngest of four children of Francesco Colautti, a Friulian engineer employed by the Austro-Hungarian Empire, and Luisa Couarde, a French native of Antibes, Arturo spent his adolescence in his native town, where he graduated in the local High School and then did his military service in the Austro-Hungarian Empire.

He was interested very early in journalism: at the age of 17 he founded the newspaper Il Progresso, followed by La Leva. At that time he studied at the Universities of Vienna and Graz, majoring in political science and geography. He thereafter went to Fiume to direct La Bilancia, to return again to his native Zara to direct Il Dalmata from 1872 to 1874.

He relocated to Spalato in 1876, where he founded the magazine of culture and literature, Rivista Dalmatica. The magazine did not last long, because strongly pro-Italian and related to Antonio Bajamonti. In the same year, he was asked to direct L'Avvenire and – from 1876 to 1880 – he developed it as an irredentist newspaper.

Following the publication of an anti-Austrian article on his newspaper, in September 1880, Colautti was attacked by a group of soldiers that rendered him impaired for a few months. Shortly after, also because of the threat of lawsuit for crimes against the stringent Austrian press laws and in support of Italian irredentism, Colautti chose the path of exile and took refuge in the Kingdom of Italy.

=== The Neapolitan Period and the late years ===
"He first settled in Padua, where he founded L’Euganeo, then in Milan, where he founded L’Italia" and collaborated with various newspapers. Colautti founded the Corriere del Mattino in Naples (1885), then became its director and remained there for fifteen years, after which he undertook the direction of the Corriere di Napoli. In the many years spent in Naples, he wrote hundreds of articles, but also poems, novels and plays, gaining an excellent literary reputation. Some of his operatic librettos were set to music (Adriana Lecouvreur by Cilea, Fedora by Umberto Giordano and Doña Flor by Niccolò van Westerhout).

Colautti was a forceful writer and vehement polemicist. "He also wrote a sentimental composition in seven sonnets, Annie, for Annie Vivanti, which was published in the Cronaca Partenopea." "He dueled with Matteo Renato Imbriani."

Under the pseudonym of "Fram", Colautti was also a military critic of the Corriere della Sera during the Russo-Japanese War (1904) and again in Milan from 1912 to 1914, when he directed L'Alba, and returned to work in Milan at Via Solferino.

For the duration of the exile, Colautti maintained close contacts with the Dalmatian irredentists and actively participated nationally in various events and conferences.

At the outbreak of World War I, Colautti was one of the many Dalmatian Italian interventionists, but died a few months before Italian intervention in the conflict. For matters of public order, he had no public honors, and his body was buried with a private ceremony at the cemetery of Verano.

== See also ==
- Italian irredentism in Dalmatia
- Antonio Bajamonti
- Dalmatian Italians
