= Dossi =

Dossi is an Italian surname. It may refer to:

- Battista Dossi (c. 1490–1548) – Italian painter, brother of Dosso Dossi
- Carlo Dossi (1849–1910) – Italian writer
- Dosso Dossi (c. 1490–1542) – Italian painter, brother of Battista Dossi
- Sofie Dossi (born 2001) – American contortionist
- Tommaso Dossi (1678–1730) – Italian painter

It may also refer to a municipality in the province of Pavia:

- Bastida de' Dossi
