= Umberto Lilloni =

Italian painter (1898–1980)

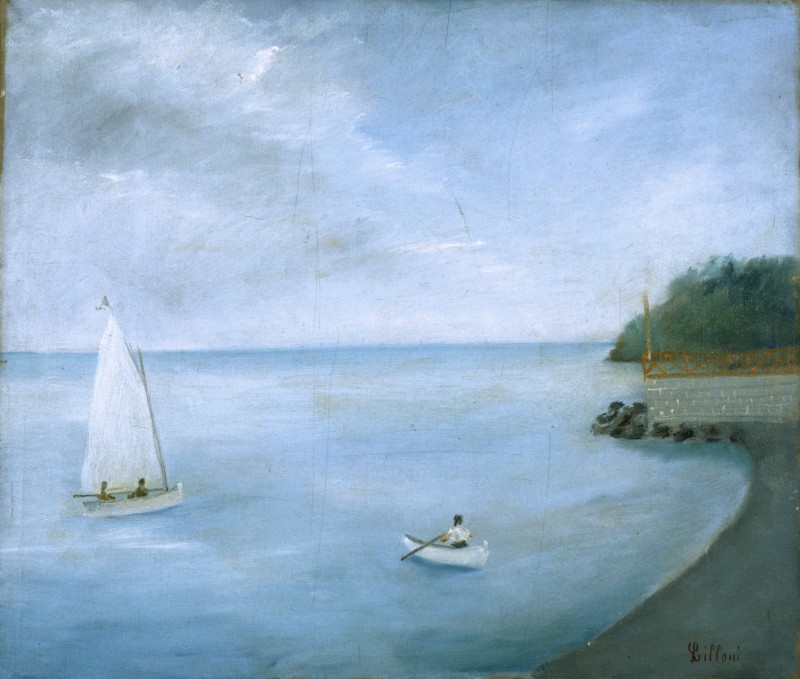
Tramonto sul mare o Paesaggio di Lavagna, c.1934 (Fondazione Cariplo)

Umberto Lilloni (1 March 1898–15 June 1980) was an Milan-born Italian painter whose work has featured in the Turin Civic Gallery of Modern and Contemporary Art. His work has been offered at auction multiple times, with realized prices ranging from US$1 to $21,770, depending on the size and medium of the artwork. Since 1998 the record price for this artist at auction is $21,770 for La dogana a Venezia (1939), sold at Sotheby's Milan in 2005. Lilloni died in Milan 1980.

== Biography ==
Lilloni interrupted his studies at the Brera Academy of Fine Arts in 1917 when World War I broke out. Alternating landscape with figure painting in the 1920s, he received his first official recognition with the Prince Umberto Prize in 1927. His participation in the Venice Biennale began in 1928 with the 16th Esposizione Internazionale d'Arte della Città di Venezia. Involvement with the Novecento Italiano movement led to participation in their second group show in Milan in 1929. The influence of Chiarismo can also be seen in the gradual lightening of his palette. His first solo exhibition was held at the Galleria Bardi, Milan, in the same year. While the 1930s saw increased participation in exhibitions, including the Rome Quadrenniale and the Brera exhibitions at the national level, the art world showed less interest in his painting after World War II.

== Other projects ==
Media related to Umberto Lilloni at Wikimedia Commons
