= Bwa people =

African society

Bwa
Total population
- 300,000

Regions with significant populations
- Burkina Faso: 175,000
- Mali: 125,000

Languages
- Bwamu, French

Religion
- Animism (85%); Christianity (10%); Islam (5%)

The Bwa is an African society that is native to Burkina Faso. This society has an approximate population of over 300,000 persons. The Bwa people live in a number of individualized communities. They have no central government, and rely on their community standards. They are most known for their scarification and elaborate plank masks.

== History ==
In the 18th century, Bwa lands were occupied by the Bamana empire who made the Bwa pay taxes. The places left unconquered were raided by the Bamana, which led to a weakening of the Bwa social and political systems. In the 19th century, the Bamana declined and the area was dominated by the Fulani who raided and enslaved the Bwa and stole their livestock. The end of the 19th century brought French mercenaries who used the Fulani to help control the area. The Bwa traditions of storing crops for use in lean years were undermined by the crippling taxation systems of the French and they suffered further from famine from 1911–1913. The French demanded military recruits from the Bwa and in 1915, the Bwa revolted., starting the Volta-Bani War. This war lasted about a year and ended with the destruction of many Bwa villages.

Due to these events, the Bwa turned to their neighboring people, the Nuna. Admiring what they believed to be continuous blessings, the Bwa wanted to adopt some Nuna customs in attempt to please the Nuna God. Obliging, the Nuna taught the Bwa some of their customs and practices. From this, the Bwa purchased the rights to use, wear, and carve wooden masks, their costumes, and the songs and dances that go with them.

== Regional Identification ==
The Bwa live in central Burkina Faso and south-east Mali, between Mali's Bani River and the Mouhoun River (Black Volta) in Burkina Faso. Their total population is approximately 300,000. The major towns occupied by the Bwa are Houndé, Boni, Bagassi, Dossi and Pa.

Early European explorers to the area called the Bwa "Bobo", confusing them with their neighbours the Bobo people. Although the two groups share religion and culture, they are ethnically distinct. The confusion led to alternative names for the Bwa including Bobo Oule, or Eastern Bobo. In Jula, Bobo Oule means "Red Bobo". This distinguishes the Bwa from the Bobo who are called the "Black Bobo".

The White Bobo, Bobo Gbe, are also Bwa.

The southern Bwa became known by their neighbours as Nieniegue meaning "scarred Bwa" as a result of the tradition of scarification of their faces and bodies. This practice is no longer commonplace and so the term is also in decline.

== Society and politics ==
=== Economy ===
There are three professional castes within the Bwa society: the farmers, the musicians, and the blacksmiths.

Farming has been a constant way of life for the Bwa. It is their primary source of income with their most successful crop being cotton. Besides cotton, though, the Bwa are known to harvest certain grains such as millet, rice, sorghum, yams, and peanuts. These crops along with other grains and various fruits are used for both nutritional and medicinal purposes.

Music is integral to the Bwa's traditional ceremonies and rituals. While they do use drums, the Bwa are known to craft and play flutes carved from wood.

Blacksmiths in the Bwa society work mostly with bronze to craft masks, figures, utensils, and jewelry. These works can be bought and sold, used for personal use, and/or are utilized during rituals.

=== Politics ===
Bwa villages are autonomous and they do not recognise any outside political authority. They are led by a council of male elders who make all the major decisions.

== Culture ==
=== Language ===
The Bwa speak Bwa languages, a closely related group of Gur languages of the Niger–Congo family. Some speak Jula (Dioula) for trading and communication with outsiders, and French is also used.

=== Religion and mythology ===
The creator deity of the Bwa is known as Wuro, a god who designed the earth with the intention of establishing balance. Wuro was said to be hurt by a human, and in return, he decided to send his eldest son Dwo to act as the communication line between him and the people. Wuro had three sons: Dwo, the god of rebirth, Soxo, the god of the wilderness, and Kwere, the lightning god. Two and his significance is heavily depicted in the Boni Bwa's ceremonial leaf masks. Animism is the main religious belief practiced by the Bwa. In fact, the art work that the Bwa are known for is primarily used for animist practices—specifically that of Nuna origin.

==== Denominations ====
Nuna practices still hold firm in the Bwa culture. In relation, there is a group called the Cult of Do (or Dwo). They are led by the village's eldest male member, the Labie (also known as the earth priest.)

With that being said, they have also adopted both Islam and Christianity as a result of their prior invasions.

==== Practices ====
While the Bwa are famous for their masks, it is the purpose behind the pieces that provides the real significance. Using these masks, along with scepters and diverse body adornments, the Bwa will dance and perform these items in representation of different spirits. Those Bwa members who have gone through initiation—a process of transitioning from a child to an adult member of society—are grouped together in age grades. During ceremonies, they adorn and praise the masks that are being performed as a group. It is also important to note that these mask performances are not gender specific. Women are very much a part of these events just as much as their male counterparts.

==== Tools ====
The Bwa use various divination sculptures and carvings to carry out significant ceremonies and practices. While sculpted figures are a rare art of the Bwa's, the pieces would be used for events such as divination ceremonies, fertility rituals, and offered sacrifices.

=== Art ===
==== Masks ====
===== Style =====
The Bwa masks are usually black and white; additional colors are subject to individual carvers and their styles. Animal depictions are a common attribute of the works. Plank Masks are the most known style of masks for this society. they are vertically shaped and attached to a disk-like base. Decoration is subject to change, but it mostly comes down to zigzags, squares, and circles. The Bwa also make horizontal and heterogenous masks. Heterogenous masks have an ovoid head with round and/or diamond eyes. Sometimes, the artist will choose to add on designs such as crescents or human figures.

===== Use =====
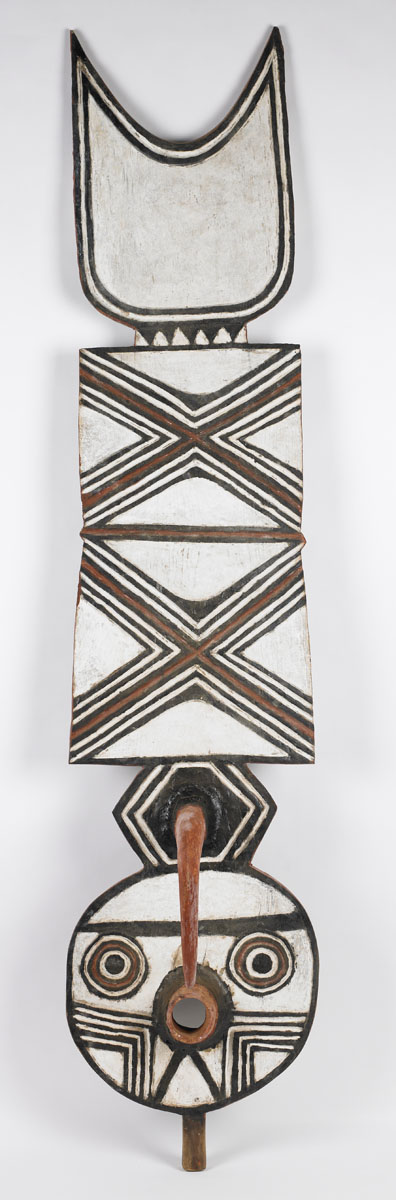
Luruya mask with abstract design of geometric patterns, all of which are symbolic; 19th-20th centuries; painted wood and fibre; height: 81.3 cm; Birmingham Museum of Art (USA). This diminutive mask represents Luruya, an ancestor who was small in stature yet revered because he could communicate with animals. The crescent above the a panel with crossed lines, and a red horn above a circular face are characteristic of Bwa plank masks. The lines represent forehead scarification

The Bwa are well known for their use of traditional tribal masks. There are several types of masks produced by the Bwa that are used in traditional rituals.

In particular the Southern Bwa are known for their tall plank masks, known as nwantantay, and tend to use wood to make their masks. This is a result of their adoption of Nuna religion and their traditions of using wooden masks. The religion associated with wooden masks is focused on the spirit Lanle, whose power is manifested through the wooden masks. Nwantantay can also be made of polychrome by the blacksmiths. Built in horizontal shapes, these masks can represent different animals and have specific designs. For example, a butterfly mask would have concentric circles, while a hawk mask would have a plain white surface. these masks are worn for female entertainment.

The northern Bwa use leaf masks more than wooden ones. These leaf masks frequently represent Dwo in religious ceremonies. The masks also represent the bush spirits including serpents, monkeys, buffalo and hawks. Mask performances generally take place in the dry season between February and May.

==== Bronzeworks ====
Blacksmiths are also known to make utensils and body adornments for their people. These pieces, much like the masks, tend to represent animals and their attributes associated with them. For example, a blacksmith may use a hyena to show stupidity or a bush cow to symbolize strength. The most common depictions are of the double chameleon and the hornbill. The chameleon would be mostly used by women who want to have children but cannot.

==== Instruments ====
Flutes are used daily. They are usually played in sets of 5 to 9 pieces. By playing short diverse patterns in an interlocking form, the musicians tell a story. It is a form of communication—reproducing the speech of tonal languages. They are commonly accompanied by dances.
