= Languages of Ghana =

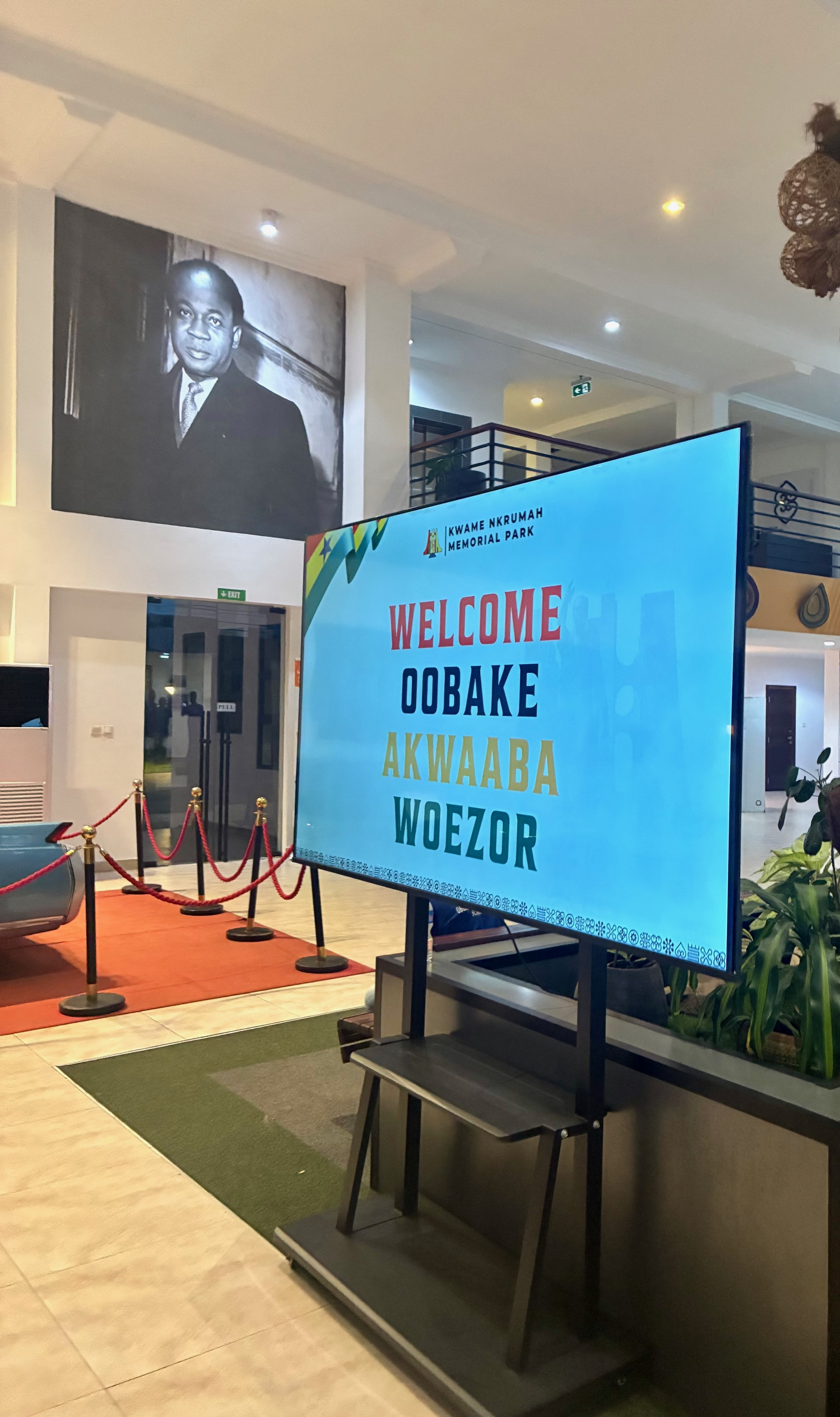
- Multilingual sign in Ghana (entrance to the Kwame Nkrumah Mausoleum)
- Official: English
- Regional: Government-sponsored languages: Fante, Akuapem Twi, Asante Twi, Ewe, Dagaare, Dagbanli, Adangme, Ga, Gonja, Kasem, Nzema
- Immigrant: Chinese; Hindi; Arabic; Sindhi; Yoruba
- Foreign: French
- Signed: Ghanaian Sign Language (American Sign Language); Adamorobe Sign Language; Nanabin Sign Language
- Lingua franca: Ghanaian English; Ghanaian Pidgin English

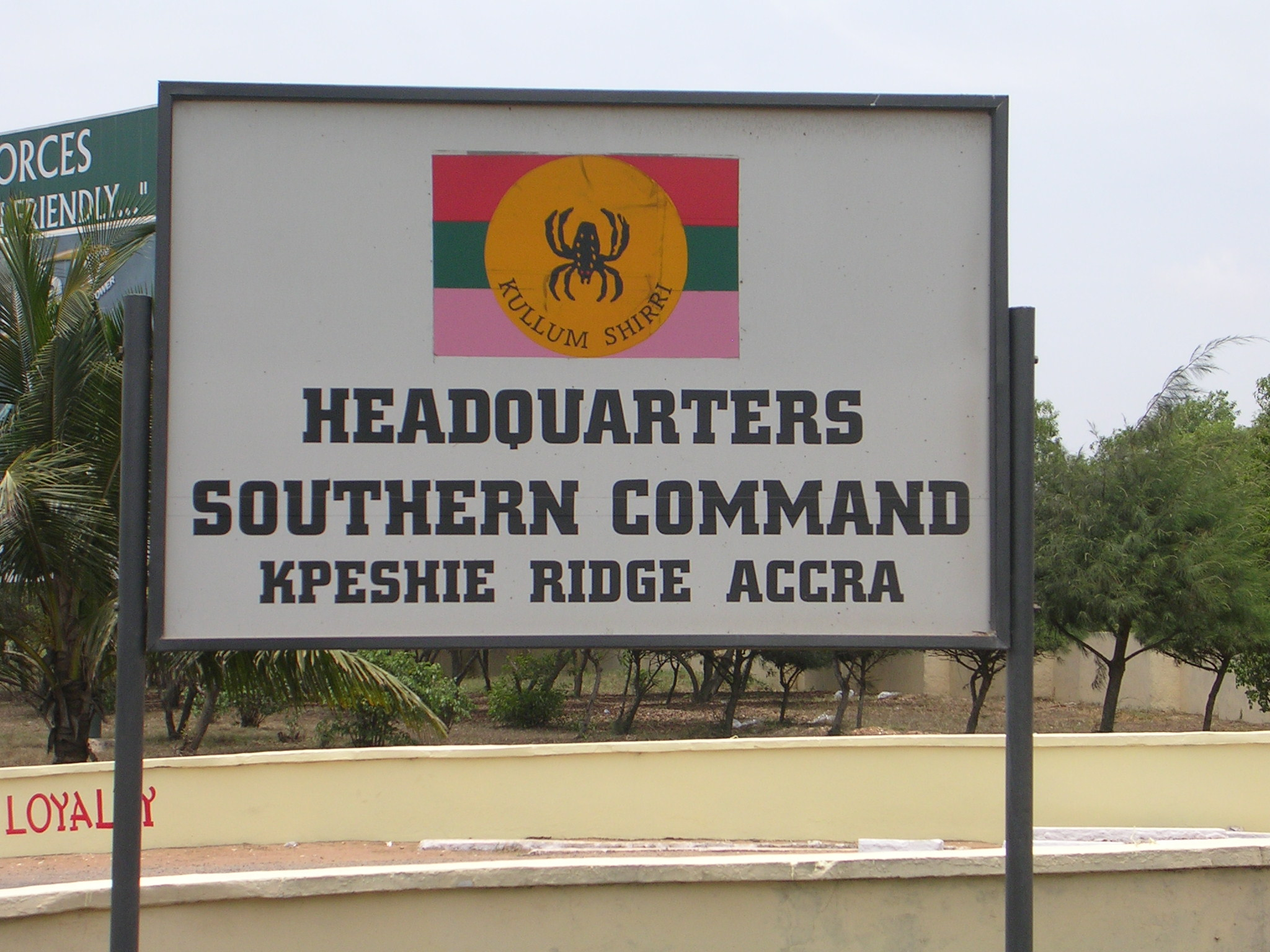
A government sign in English in Accra

Ghana is a multilingual country in which about 80 languages are spoken. Of these, English, which was inherited from the colonial era, is the official language and lingua franca. Of the languages indigenous to Ghana, Akan is the most widely spoken in the south. Dagbani, Dagare, Sisaala, Waale, and Gonja are among the most widely spoken in the northern part of the country.

Ghana has more than seventy ethnic groups, each with its own distinct language. Languages that belong to the same ethnic group are usually mutually intelligible. The Dagbanli, Nanumba and Mamprusi languages of Northern Region, are almost the same and, are mutually intelligible with the Frafra and Waali languages of the Upper East and Upper West Regions of Ghana. The Mole–Dagbani languages are spoken by more than 20% of the population.

Eleven languages have the status of government-sponsored languages: three Akan dialects (Akuapem Twi, Asante Twi and Fante) and two Mole–Dagbani languages (Dagaare and Dagbanli). The others are Ewe, Dangme, Ga, Nzema, Gonja, and Kasem.

In April 2019, the Ghanaian government declared its intention to make French one of Ghana's official languages due to the country being surrounded by Francophone countries (Burkina Faso to a lesser extent, the Ivory Coast and Togo) and the presence of a French-speaking minority in the country.

== Government-sponsored languages ==
The number of government-sponsored languages is either eleven or nine, depending on whether or not Akuapem Twi, Asante Twi, and Fante are considered a single language. They are supported by the Bureau of Ghana Languages, which was established in 1951 and publishes materials in the languages; during the periods when Ghanaian languages were used in primary education, these were the languages which were used. All these languages belong to the Niger–Congo language family, though to several different branches.

=== Akan (Fante, Asante Twi and Akuapem Twi) ===
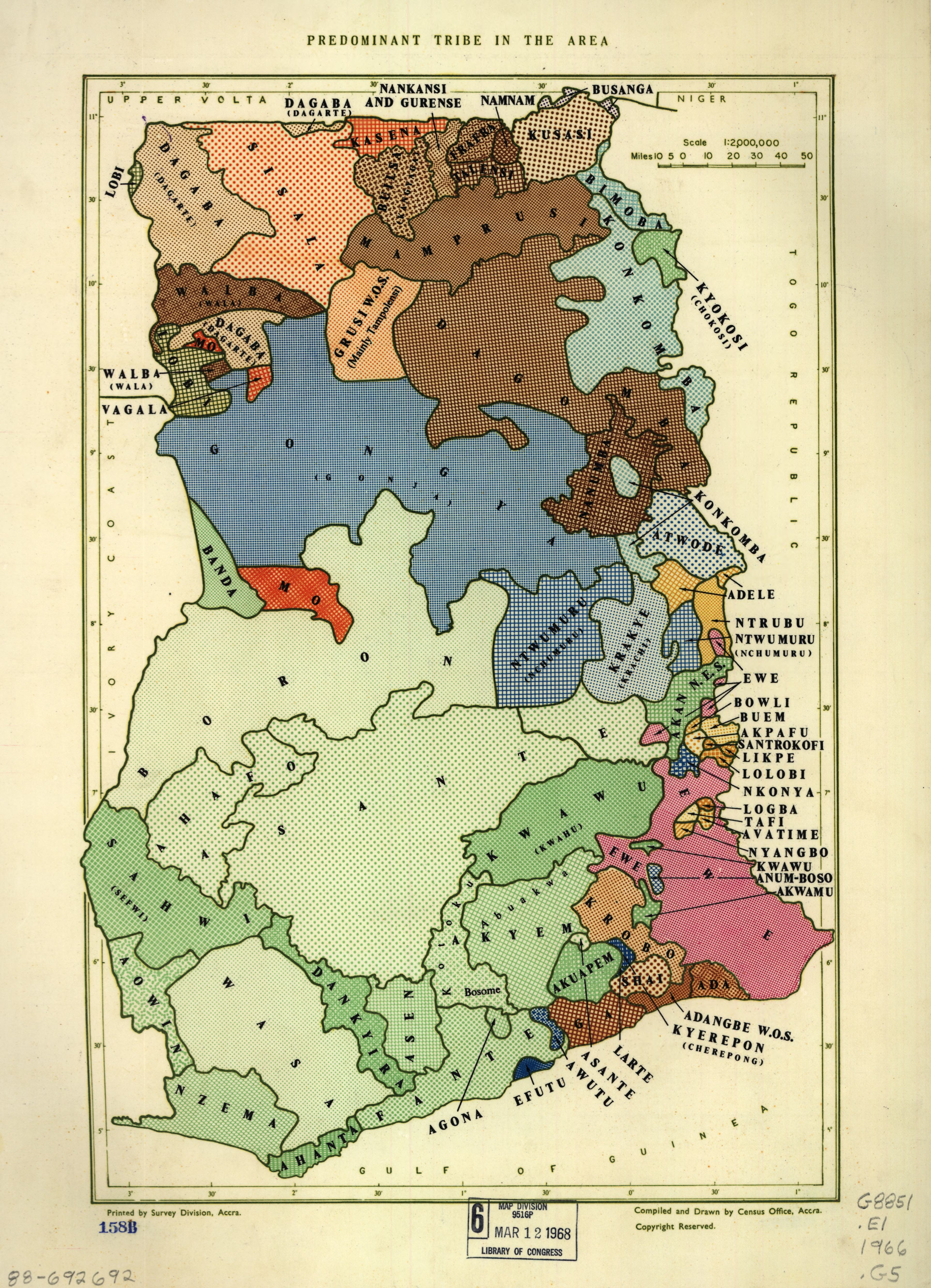
A map of Ghana's ethno-linguistic areas

Akan, part of the Kwa branch of the Niger–Congo family, is a dialect continuum, but with regard to official status, only a few out of the many varieties of Akan are recognised: Fante, Asante Twi, Akuapem Twi. Taken as a whole, Akan is the most-widely spoken language in Ghana.

=== Ewe ===
Ewe is a Gbe language, part of the Volta–Niger branch of the Niger–Congo family. The Ewe Language is spoken in Ghana, Togo and Benin with a trace of the language in West Nigeria. Out of the many dialects of Ewe spoken in Ghana, the major ones are Anlo, Tongu, Vedome, Gbi, and Krepi.

=== Dagbani ===
Dagbani is one of the Gur languages. It is the most spoken language in Northern Ghana. The number of native speakers numbers more than three million, this number will reach six million if dialects such as Nanumba, Mamprusi and Kamara are added. It belongs to the larger Mole–Dagbani ethnic group found in Ghana and makes up about 18.5% of the population. It is spoken by Dagombas in the Northern Region of Ghana.

=== Dangme ===
Dangme is one of the Ga–Dangme languages within the Kwa branch. It is spoken in Greater Accra, in south-east Ghana and Togo. Dangme is a West African Kwa language spoken in Ghana, and it has been gaining popularity among Ghana residents.

=== Dagaare ===
Dagaare is another of the Gur languages. It is spoken in the Upper West Region of Ghana. It is also spoken in Burkina Faso. Waali, spoken by the Wala people, and the Dagaare language are languages that can be understood by each other's speakers.

=== Ga ===
Ga is the other Ga–Dangme language within the Kwa branch. Ga is spoken in south-eastern Ghana, in and around the capital Accra. It is a Niger-Congo language in the Kwa branch, spoken by around 600,000 people in Ghana. Six separate towns comprised the Ga-speaking peoples: Accra, Osu, Labadi, Teshi, Nungua, and Tema. Each town had a central stool of importance in Ga traditions. Accra, among these towns, rose to prominence and now serves as Ghana's capital.

=== Nzema ===
Nzema is one of the Bia languages, closely related to Akan. It is spoken by the Nzema people in the Western Region of Ghana. It is also spoken in the Ivory Coast. Nzema, also known as Appolo, is mainly spoken in Ghana's Jomoro district and Ivory Coast's Comoé district. In 2004, it had around 330,000 speakers. The Nzema language utilizes a Latin-based script and comprises a total of twenty-four alphabetic characters.

=== Kasem ===
Kasem is a Gurunsi language, in the Gur branch. It is spoken in the Upper Eastern Region of Ghana. It is also spoken in Burkina Faso. By 1998, Kasem had around 250,000 speakers, divided between Ghana (130,000) and Burkina Faso (120,000). It's alternatively known as Kasena, Kasim, Kassem, Kasɩm, or Kassena.

=== Gonja ===
Gonja is one of the Guang languages, part of the Tano languages within the Kwa branch along with Akan and Bia. It is spoken in the Northern Region of Ghana and Wa. "Gonja" comes from "Kada Goro-Jaa" in Hausa, signifying "land of Red Cola." Ghana has over 285,000 Gonja people.

== Languages spoken in Ghana by number of speakers ==
This chart reflects data provided by Ethnologue.

Rank	Language	Speakers
1	English	9,800,002
2	Akan (Fante/Twi)	9,100,000
3	Ghanaian Pidgin English	5,000,000
4	Ewe Dialects of Ɛve include Aŋlo, Tɔŋu, Vɛdomɛ, Gbi, Krepi, among others)	3,820,000
5	Abron	1,170,000
6	Dagbani (including Mamprusi, and Nanumba dialects)	1,160,000
7	Dangme	1,020,000
8	Dagaare	924,000
9	Konkomba	831,000
10	Ga	745,000
11	Farefare	638,000
12	Kusaal	535,000
13	Mampruli	414,000
14	Gonja	310,000
15	Sehwi	305,000
16	Nzema	299,000
17	French	273,795
18	Wasa	273,000
19	Sisaala, Tumulung	219,000
20	Sisaala, Western	219,000
21	Bimoba	176,000
22	Ahanta	175,000
23	Ntcham	169,000
24	Buli	168,000
25	Bisa	166,000
26	Kasem	149,000
27	Tem	134,000
28	Cherepon	132,000
29	Birifor, Southern	125,000
30	Anufo	91,300
31	Wali	84,800
32	Larteh	74,000
33	Siwu	71,900
34	Chumburung	69,000
35	Anyin	66,400
35	Nafaanra	61,000
36	Krache	58,000
37	Lelemi	48,900
38	Deg	42,900
39	Paasaal	36,000
40	Kabre, (language kabre)	35,642
41	Avatime	27,200
42	Kulango, Bondoukou	27,000
43	Sekpele	23,000
44	Delo	18,400
45	Jwira-Pepesa	18,000
46	Gua	17,600
47	Tampulma	16,000
48	Kulango, Bouna	15,500
49	Ligbi	15,000
50	Nawuri	14,000
51	Vagla	13,900
52	Tuwuli	11,400
53	Selee	11,300
54	Adele	11,000
55	Nkonya	11,000
56	Gikyode	10,400
57	Dwang	8,200
58	Akposo	7,500
59	Logba	7,500
60	Nkami	7,000
61	Hanga	6,800
62	Nyangbo	6,400
63	Chakali	6,000
64	Ghanaian Sign Language	6,000
65	Safaliba	5,000
66	Tafi	4,400
67	Fulfulde, Maasina	4,240
68	Adangbe/Dangbe	4,000
69	Konni	3,800
70	Adamorobe Sign Language	3,500
71	Chala	3,000
72	Kamara	3,000
73	Kantosi	2,300
74	Kusuntu	2,100
75	Nchumbulu	1,800
76	Kplang	1,600
77	Dompo	970
78	Animere	700
79	Hausa	Unclear
80	Lama	1
81	Nawdm	Unclear

== Language classification ==
The language of Ghana belong to the following branches within the Niger–Congo language family:

- Kwa languages (Akan, Bia, Guang in Tano; Ga and Adangme)
- Gbe languages (Ewe)
- Gur languages (Gurunsi, Dagbani, Mossi, Dagaare, and Frafra in Oti–Volta)
- Senufo languages (Nafaanra)
- Kulango languages
- Mande languages (Wangara, Ligbi)

Older classifications may instead group them as Kwa, Gur, and Mande.

== See also ==
- Ghana
- Demographics of Ghana
- Ghanaian English
