= The Languages of Africa =

1963 book by Joseph Greenberg

- Cover of the first edition
- Author: Joseph Greenberg
- Language: English
- Subject: Languages of Africa
- Published: 1963
- Publication place: United States
- Media type: Print

The Languages of Africa is a 1963 book of essays by the linguist Joseph Greenberg, in which the author sets forth a genetic classification of African languages that, with some changes, continues to be the most commonly used one today. It is an expanded and extensively revised version of his 1955 work Studies in African Linguistic Classification, which was itself a compilation of eight articles which Greenberg had published in the Southwestern Journal of Anthropology between 1949 and 1954. It was first published in 1963 as Part II of the International Journal of American Linguistics, Vol. 29, No. 1; however, its second edition of 1966, in which it was published (by Indiana University, Bloomington: Mouton & Co., The Hague) as an independent work, is more commonly cited.

Its author describes it as based on three fundamentals of method:

- "The sole relevance in comparison of resemblances involving both sound and meaning in specific forms."
- "Mass comparison as against isolated comparisons between pairs of languages."
- "Only linguistic evidence is relevant in drawing conclusions about classification."

== Innovations ==
Greenberg's Niger–Congo family was substantially foreshadowed by Westermann's "Western Sudanic", but he changed the subclassification, including Fulani (as West Atlantic) and the newly postulated Adamawa–Eastern, excluding Songhai, and classifying Bantu as merely a subfamily of Benue–Congo (previously termed "Semi-Bantu").

Semitic, Berber, Egyptian and Cushitic had been generally accepted as members of a "Hamito-Semitic" family, while Chadic, Fulani, "Nilo-Hamitic" and Hottentot had all been controversially proposed as members. He accepted Chadic (while changing its membership),and rejected the other three, establishing to most linguists' satisfaction that they had been classified as "Hamitic" for purely typological reasons. This demonstration also led to the rejection (by him and by linguists generally) of the term Hamitic as having no coherent meaning in historical linguistics; as a result, he renamed the newly reclassified family "Afroasiatic".

Following Schapera and rejecting Meinhof, he classified Hottentot as a member of the Central Khoisan languages. To Khoisan he also added the much more northerly Hadza (Hatsa) and Sandawe.

His most revolutionary step was the postulation of the Nilo-Saharan family. This is still controversial, because so far attempts to reconstruct this family have been unsuccessful, but it holds promise and it is widely used. Prior linguists had noticed an apparent relationship between the majority of the languages, but had never formally proposed a family. These languages – the Eastern Sudanic, Central Sudanic, Kunama and Berta branches – Greenberg placed into a core group he called Chari–Nile, to which he added all the remaining unclassified languages of Africa that did not have noun classes. The distinction between Chari–Nile and the peripheral branches has since been abandoned. On a lower level, he placed "Nilo-Hamitic" firmly within Nilotic, following a suggestion of Köhler, and placed Eastern Sudanic on a firmer foundation.

Finally, he assigned the unclassified languages of the Nuba Hills of South Kordofan to the Niger–Congo family, calling the result Congo–Kordofanian. The relationship has been accepted, with the exception of the "Tumtum" group, though the Kordofanian languages are no longer seen as being a primary branch, and the name "Congo–Kordofanian" is no longer used.

Greenberg's four families became the dominant conception of African languages, though his subclassification did not fare as well. Niger−Congo and Afroasiatic are nearly universally accepted, with no significant support for Hamitic or the independence of Bantu. Nilo-Saharan is still considered provisional. Khoisan is now rejected by specialists, except as a term of convenience, though it may be retained in less specialized literature.

== Classification ==
The book classifies Africa's languages into four stocks not presumed to be related to each other, as follows:

=== I. Congo–Kordofanian ===
I.A Niger–Congo

I.A.1 West Atlantic

I.A.1.a Northern: Wolof, Serer-Sin, Fulani, Serer-Non, Konyagi, Basari, Biafada, Badyara (Pajade), Dyola, Mandyak, Balante, Banyun, Nalu, Cobiana, Cassanga, Bidyogo
I.A.1.b Southern: Temne, Baga, Landoma, Kissi, Bulom, Limba, Gola

I.A.2 Mande

I.A.2.a Western

I.A.2.a.1 Malinke, Bambara, Dyula, Mandinka, Numu, Ligbi, Huela, Vai, Kono, Koranko, Khasonke Bobo
I.A.2.a.3 Mende, Loko, Gbandi, Loma, Kpelle (Guerze)
I.A.2.a.4 Susu, Dyalonke
I.A.2.a.5 Soninke, Bozo
I.A.2.a.6 Duun, Dzuun, Jo, Seenku (Sembla), Kpan, Banka

I.A.2.b Eastern

I.A.2.b.1 Mano, Dan (Gio), Guro (Kweni), Mwa, Nwa, Beng, Gban, Tura (Wen), Yaure
I.A.2.b.2 Samo, Bisa, Busa, Kyenga, Shanga

I.A.3 Voltaic

I.A.3.a Senoufo: Minianka, Tagba, Foro, Tagwana (Takponin), Dyimini, Nafana
I.A.3.b. ~~Lobi-Dogon~~: Lobi, Dyan, Puguli, Gan, Gouin, Turuka, Doghosie, Doghosie-Fing, Kyan, Tara, Bwamu, Wara, Natioro, ~~Dogon~~, Kulango
I.A.3.c Grusi: Awuna, Kasena, Nunuma, Lyele, Tamprusi, ~~Kanjaga (Bulea)~~ (moved to group d), Degha, Siti, Kurumba (Fulse), Sisala
I.A.3.d Mossi, Dagomba, Kusasi, Nankanse, Talensi, Mamprusi, Wala, Dagari, Birifo, Namnam, Kanjaga (Bulea) (moved from group c)
I.A.3.e Tem, Kabre, Delo, Chala
I.A.3.f Bargu (Bariba)
I.A.3.g Gurma, Tobote (Basari), Kasele (Chamba), Moba
I.A.3.x Dogon

I.A.4 Kwa

I.A.4.a Kru: Bete, Bakwe, Grebo, Bassa, De, Kru (Krawi)
I.A.4.b Avatime, Nyangbo, Tafi, Logba, Likpe, Ahlo, Akposo, Lefana, Bowili, Akpafu, Santrokofi, Adele, Kebu, Anyimere, Ewe, Aladian, Avikam, Gwa, Kyama, Akye, Ari, Abe, Adyukru, Akan (Twi, Anyi, Baule, Guang, Metyibo, Abure), Ga, Adangme
I.A.4.c Yoruba, Igala
I.A.4.d Nupe, Gbari, Igbira, Gade
I.A.4.e Bini, Ishan, Kukuruku, Sobo
I.A.4.f Idoma, Agatu, Iyala
I.A.4.g Ibo
I.A.4.h Ijo

I.A.5 Benue–Congo

I.A.5.A Plateau

I.A.5.A.1

I.A.5.A.1.a Kambari, Dukawa, Dakakari, Basa, Kamuku, Reshe
I.A.5.A.1.b Piti, Janji, Kurama, Chawai, Anaguta, Buji, Amap, Gure, Kahugu, Ribina, Butawa, Kudawa

I.A.5.A.2 Afusare, Irigwe, Katab, Kagoro, Kaje, Kachicheri, Morwa, Jaba, Kamantan, Kadara, Koro, Afo
I.A.5.A.3 Birom, Ganawuri (Aten)
I.A.5.A.4 Rukuba, Ninzam, Ayu, Mada, Kaninkwom
I.A.5.A.5 Eggon, Nungu, Yeskwa
I.A.5.A.6 Kaleri, Pyem, Pai
I.A.5.A.7 Yergam, Basherawa

I.A.5.B Jukunoid: Jukun, Kentu, Nyidu, Tigong, Eregba, Mbembe, Zumper (Kutev, Mbarike), Boritsu
I.A.5.C Cross-River

I.A.5.C.1 Boki, Gayi (Uge), Yakoro
I.A.5.C.2 Ibibio, Efik, Ogoni (Kana), Andoni, Akoiyang, Ododop, Korop
I.A.5.C.3 Akunakuna, Abine, Yako, Asiga, Ekuri, Ukelle, Okpoto-Mteze, Olulomo

I.A.5.D Bantoid: Tiv, Bitare, Batu, Ndoro, Mambila, Bute, Bantu

I.A.6 Adamawa–Eastern

I.A.6.A Adamawa

I.A.6.A.1 Tula, Dadiya, Waja, Cham, Kamu
I.A.6.A.2 Chamba, Donga, Lekon, Wom, Mumbake
I.A.6.A.3 Daka, Taram
I.A.6.A.4 Vere, Namshi, Kolbila, Pape, Sari, Sewe, Woko, Kotopo, Kutin, Durru
I.A.6.A.5 Mumuye, Kumba, Gengle, Teme, Waka, Yendang, Zinna
I.A.6.A.6 Dama, Mono, Mbere, Mundang, Yasing, Mangbei, Mbum, Kpere, Lakka, Dek
I.A.6.A.7 Yungur, Mboi, Libo, Roba
I.A.6.A.8 Kam
I.A.6.A.9 Jen, Munga
I.A.6.A.10 Longuda
I.A.6.A.11 Fali
I.A.6.A.12 Nimbari

I.A.6.A.13 Bua, Nielim, Koke
I.A.6.A.14 Masa

I.A.6.B Eastern

I.A.6.B.1 Gbaya, Manja, Mbaka
I.A.6.B.2 Banda
I.A.6.B.3 Ngbandi, Sango, Yakoma
I.A.6.B.4 Zande, Nzakara, Barambo, Pambia
I.A.6.B.5 Bwaka, Monjombo, Gbanziri, Mundu, Mayogo, Bangba
I.A.6.B.6 Ndogo, Bai, Bviri, Golo, Sere, Tagbo, Feroge, Indri, Mangaya, Togoyo
I.A.6.B.7 Amadi (Madyo, Ma)
I.A.6.B.8 Mondunga, Mba (Bamanga)

I.B Kordofanian

I.B.1 Koalib: Koalib, Kanderma, Heiban, Laro, Otoro, Kawama, Shwai, Tira, Moro, Fungor
I.B.2 Tegali: Tegali, Rashad, Tagoi, Tumale
I.B.3 Talodi: Talodi, Lafofa, Eliri, Masakin, Tacho, Lumun, El Amira
I.B.4 Tumtum: Tumtum, Tuleshi, Keiga, Karondi, Krongo, Miri, Kadugli, Katcha
I.B.5 Katla: Katla, Tima

=== II. Nilo-Saharan ===
II.A Songhai
II.B Saharan

II.B.a Kanuri, Kanembu
II.B.b Teda, Daza
II.B.c Zaghawa, Berti

II.C Maban: Maba, Runga, Mimi of Nachtigal, Mimi of Gaudefroy-Demombynes
II.D. Fur
II.E. Chari–Nile

II.E.1 Eastern Sudanic

II.E.1.1 Nubian

II.E.1.1.a Nile Nubian (Mahas-Fadidja and Kenuzi-Dongola)
II.E.1.1.b Kordofanian Nubian: Dair, Dilling, Gulfan, Garko, Kadero, Kundugr
II.E.1.1.c Midob
II.E.1.1.d Birked

II.E.1.2 Murle (Beir), Longarim, Didinga, Suri, Mekan, Murzu, Surma (including Tirma and Zulmanu), Masongo
II.E.1.3 Barea
II.E.1.4 Ingassana (Tabi)
II.E.1.5 Nyima, Afitti
II.E.1.6 Temein, Teis-um-Danab
II.E.1.7 Merarit, Tama, Sungor
II.E.1.8 Dagu of Darfur, Baygo, Sila, Dagu of Dar Dagu (Wadai), Dagu of Western Kordofan, Njalgulgule, Shatt, Liguri
II.E.1.9 Nilotic

II.E.1.9.a Western

II.E.1.9.a.1 Burun
II.E.1.9.a.2 Shilluk, Anuak, Acholi, Lango, Alur, Luo, Jur, Bor
II.E.1.9.a.3 Dinka, Nuer

II.E.1.9.b Eastern

II.E.1.9.b.1 Bari, Fajulu, Kakwa, Mondari
II.E.1.9.b.2a Jie, Dodoth, Karamojong, Teso, Topotha, Turkana
II.E.1.9.b.2b Masai
II.E.1.9.b.3 Southern: Nandi, Suk, Tatoga

II.E.1.10 Nyangiya, Teuso

II.E.2 Central Sudanic

II.E.2.1 Bongo, Baka, Morokodo, Beli, Gberi, Sara dialects (Madjinngay, Gulai, Mbai, Gamba, Kaba, Dendje, Laka), Vale, Nduka, Tana, Horo, Bagirmi, Kuka, Kenga, Disa, Bubalia
II.E.2.2 Kreish
II.E.2.3 Binga, Yulu, Kara [= Tar Gula]
II.E.2.4 Moru, Avukaya, Logo, Keliko, Lugbara, Madi
II.E.2.5 Mangbetu, Lombi, Popoi, Makere, Meje, Asua
II.E.2.6 Mangbutu, Mamvu, Lese, Mvuba, Efe
II.E.2.7 Lendu

II.E.3 Berta
II.E.4 Kunama

II.F Koman/Coman: Komo, Ganza, Uduk, Gule, Gumuz, Mao

=== III. Afroasiatic ===
III.A Semitic
III.B Egyptian
III.C Berber
III.D Cushitic

III.D.1 Northern Cushitic: Beja (Bedauye)
III.D.2 Central Cushitic: Bogo (Bilin), Kamir, Khamta, Awiya, Damot, Kemant, Kayla, Quara
III.D.3 Eastern Cushitic: Saho-Afar, Somali, Galla, Konso, Geleba, Marille, (Reshiat, Arbore), Gardula, Gidole, Gowaze, Burji, Sidamo, Darasa, Kambata, Alaba, Hadya, Tambaro, Mogogodo (added 1966)
III.D.4 Western Cushitic: Janjero, Wolamo, Zala, Gofa, Basketo, Baditu, Haruro, Zaysse, Chara, Gimira, Benesho, Nao, Kaba, Shako, She, Maji, Kafa, Garo, Mocha, Anfillo (Mao), Shinasha, Bako, Amar, Bana, Dime, Gayi, Kerre, Tsamai, Doko, Dollo
III.D.5 Southern Cushitic: Burungi (Mbulungu), Goroa (Fiome), Alawa (Uwassi), Iraqw, Mbugu, Sanye [= Dahalo], Ngomvia (added 1966)

III.E Chad

III.E.1
III.E.1.a Hausa, Gwandara

III.E.1.b Ngizim, Mober [= Kanuri, not Chadic], Auyokawa, Shirawa, Bede
III.E.1.c

III.E.1.c.i Warjawa, Afawa, Diryawa, Miyawa, Sirawa

III.E.1.c.ii Gezawa, Sayawa, Barawa of Dass

III.E.1.d

III.E.1.d.i Bolewa, Karekare, Ngamo, Gerawa, Gerumawa, Kirifawa, Dera (Kanakuru), Tangale, Pia, Pero, Chongee, Maha (added 1966)
III.E.1.d.ii Angas, Ankwe, Bwol, Chip, Dimuk, Goram, Jorto, Kwolla, Miriam, Montol, Sura, Tal, Gerka
III.E.1.d.iii Ron

III.E.2 Kotoko group: Logone, Ngala [= Mpade?], Buduma, Kuri, Gulfei, Affade, Shoe, Kuseri
III.E.3 Bata–Margi group

III.E.3.a Bachama, Demsa, Gudo, Malabu, Njei (Kobochi, Nzangi, Zany), Zumu (Jimo), Holma, Kapsiki, Baza, Hiji, Gude (Cheke), Fali of Mubi, Fali of Kiria, Fali of Jilbu, Margi, Chibak, Kilba, Sukur, Vizik, Vemgo, Woga, Tur, Bura, Pabir, Podokwo

III.E.3.b Gabin, Hona, Tera, Jera, Hinna (Hina)

III.E.4

III.E.4.a Hina, Daba, Musgoi, Gauar
III.E.4.b Gisiga, Balda, Muturua, Mofu, Matakam

III.E.5 Gidder
III.E.6 Mandara, Gamergu
III.E.7 Musgu
III.E.8 Bana, Banana (Masa), Lame, Kulung
III.E.9

III.E.9.a Somrai, Tumak, Ndam, Miltu, Sarwa, Gulei [= Tumak?]
III.E.9.b Gabere, Chiri, Dormo, Nangire
III.E.9.c Sokoro (Bedanga), Barein
III.E.9.d Modgel
III.E.9.e Tuburi
III.E.9.f Mubi, Karbo, (added 1966: Jegu, Jonkor, Wadai-Birgid)

=== IV Khoisan ===
IV.A South African Khoisan

IV.A.1 Northern South African Khoisan
IV.A.2 Central South African Khoisan
IV.A.3 Southern South African Khoisan

IV.B Sandawe
IV.C Hatsa

== Bibliography ==
- Greenberg, Joseph H. (1963) The Languages of Africa. International journal of American linguistics, 29, 1, part 2.
- Greenberg, Joseph H. (1966) The Languages of Africa (2nd ed. with additions and corrections). Bloomington: Indiana University.
