= Adele people =

Ethnic group on the Ghanaian-Togo border area

Adele
Total population
- 37,400 (2012)

Regions with significant populations
- Ghana, Togo

Languages
- Adele, French

Related ethnic groups
- Atwodes, Basaris, Bimobas, Buems, Chokosis, Ewes, Guans, Konkombas, Kotokolis and the Likpes

The Adele people are an ethnic group and tribe of the Ghanaian-Togo border area indigenous to the Jasikan, Nkwanta South and Nkwanta North Districts of the Volta Region centered around the towns of Dadiasi and Dutukpene in Ghana and the Sotouboua Prefecture of the Centrale Region centered around the towns of Assouma Kedeme and Tiefouma in Togo. The Adele people are agricultural, primarily farming yams, cassava, plantain, beans, and rice.

== Demographics ==
A 1960 census estimated that there were 2,400 Adele people in Ghana. Today, the tribe has population size of approximately 37,400.

Other cultural groups in the Ghana-Togo border region include the Atwode, Basari, Bimoba, Buems, Chokosi, Ewe, Guang, Konkomba, Kotokoli, and Likpe peoples.

== Language ==
The Adele language, one of the Ghana–Togo Mountain languages, is spoken by Adele, Kunda, Animere, and Northern Ghanaian peoples.

== Adele Women ==
The Adele Women is an agricultural group in the Upper Volta region of Ghana. They practice subsistence farming and have been trained in Permaculture from the Permaculture Network in Ghana, under the leadership of Paul Yeboah.
