= Ƒ =

Latin letter used in some African orthographies

Lowercase F with a hook in regular type on the left and in italic on the right, the florin sign is always in italic.

The letter F with hook (uppercase Ƒ, lowercase: ƒ) is a letter of the Latin script based on the letters F and f with a descender hook added. The italic form of the lowercase letter is used as a florin symbol. A similar-looking letter, ⟨ʄ⟩ (a turned f ⟨ɟ⟩ for a voiced palatal with an implosive hook), is used in the IPA for a voiced palatal implosive.

== Regular ==
Ƒ is used in writing the Ewe language in a straight form to represent the sound [ɸ], as distinct from the letter F, which represents an [f]. It is also used in the Avatime, Lelemi, Nyangbo-Tafi, and Waci languages.

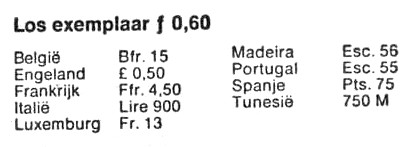
The non italic f with hook used for the florin sign on the price chart for the Algemeen Dagblad in 1980.

== Italic ==
The minuscule italic ƒ, also called the florin sign, is used as a symbol for several currencies, including the former Dutch guilder, the Aruban florin, and the Netherlands Antillean guilder. It can be found as italic in non-italic fonts.

The italic ƒ has been used to denote mathematical functions, or to indicate aperture in photography (e.g. ƒ/2.8) in place of the more common italic f (in serif fonts) or oblique f (in sans-serif fonts). It can be represented with U+1D453 𝑓 MATHEMATICAL ITALIC SMALL F.

== Appearance in computer fonts ==
Older computer fonts and character encodings included only the minuscule form. Unicode includes both the majuscule and the minuscule. Ƒ and ƒ occupy code points U+0191 Ƒ LATIN CAPITAL LETTER F WITH HOOK and U+0192 ƒ LATIN SMALL LETTER F WITH HOOK in Unicode respectively, and may be entered by appropriate input methods.

The italic form of the character, ƒ, looks very similar to the italic form of a Latin f in most serif typefaces: f.

The character has been used on the Macintosh to mean folder, in particular as part of a folder name. For example, the game Bugdom, when included on some Mac OS 9 installations, was contained in a folder called "Bugdom ƒ". This usage has died out with the advent of Mac OS X. The Macintosh Programmer's Workshop also used the character to indicate software dependencies, from which the folder usage derived (the folder contained the files required to run the program).

The character frequently appears in Japanese mojibake. Katakana characters between U+30C0 and U+30FF encoded in UTF-8 consist of the bytes 0xE3 0x83 followed by a byte between 0x80 and 0xBF. If their byte sequences are interpreted as Windows-1252, they will appear as clusters of ãƒ.

== See also ==
- African reference alphabet
- Ogonek
