= Avatime =

Avatime may refer to:

- Avatime people
- Avatime language
