= Logba =

Logba may refer to:

- the Logba people
- the Logba language
