= Dompo =

Dompo may refer to:

- Dompo language, Ghana
- Kwesi Dompo
- Dompo, a former or alternative name of Dompu, Indonesia
