= Kabye =

Kabye may refer to:

- Kabye people
- Kabye language
