= Dangbe =

Dangbe may be:

1. The Agotime language of Togo
2. The Dangme language of Ghana
3. Dàn vodún, a Fon deity of Benin
