= Attie people =

Ethnic group in Ivory Coast

An Akyé warrior

The Attié (also spelled Akyé, Akié, Atié, or Atyé) are an Akan ethnic group native to southeastern Côte d'Ivoire. They primarily inhabit the regions of Adzopé, Akoupé, Alépé, Yakassé-Attobrou, and the northern outskirts of Abidjan, particularly around Anyama. The Attié speak the Attié language, a member of the Kwa branch of the Niger-Congo language family.

According to Attié oral tradition, their ancestors originated in present-day Ghana and migrated westward during the period of Akan migrations.

They share historical and cultural ties with other Akan peoples, including the Baoulé, Agni, and Ashanti. Today, the Attié maintain a distinct cultural identity, known for their age-grade social organization, traditional festivals, music, and wood carving.

Agriculture remains the foundation of the Attié economy, with cocoa, coffee, cassava, plantains, and yams among the principal crops. While traditional religious beliefs continue to influence aspects of cultural life, the majority of Attié today identify as Christians, with smaller communities practicing Islam or indigenous religions.

== History ==
=== Origins and Akan migrations ===
The Attié early history is preserved through oral traditions, since written records from the pre-colonial period are limited. According to Akyé traditions, their ancestors originated in present-day Ghana before migrating westward into Ivory Coast.

The migration of Akan-speaking groups into Côte d'Ivoire occurred over several centuries and involved different waves of movement caused by political conflicts, competition for resources, and the expansion of powerful states in the Ghana region.

The Attié are traditionally considered related to other Akan groups such as Agni and Boulé, who also trace parts of their ancestry to migrations from the Ghanaian Akan world. Unlike the Ashanti, who developed a highly centralized monarchy under the Asantehene, the Attié did not create a large territorial empire or a single kingdom controlling all Attié communities. Instead, they developed a decentralized political system based on autonomous villages, clans, and extended family groups.

=== Pre-colonial period ===
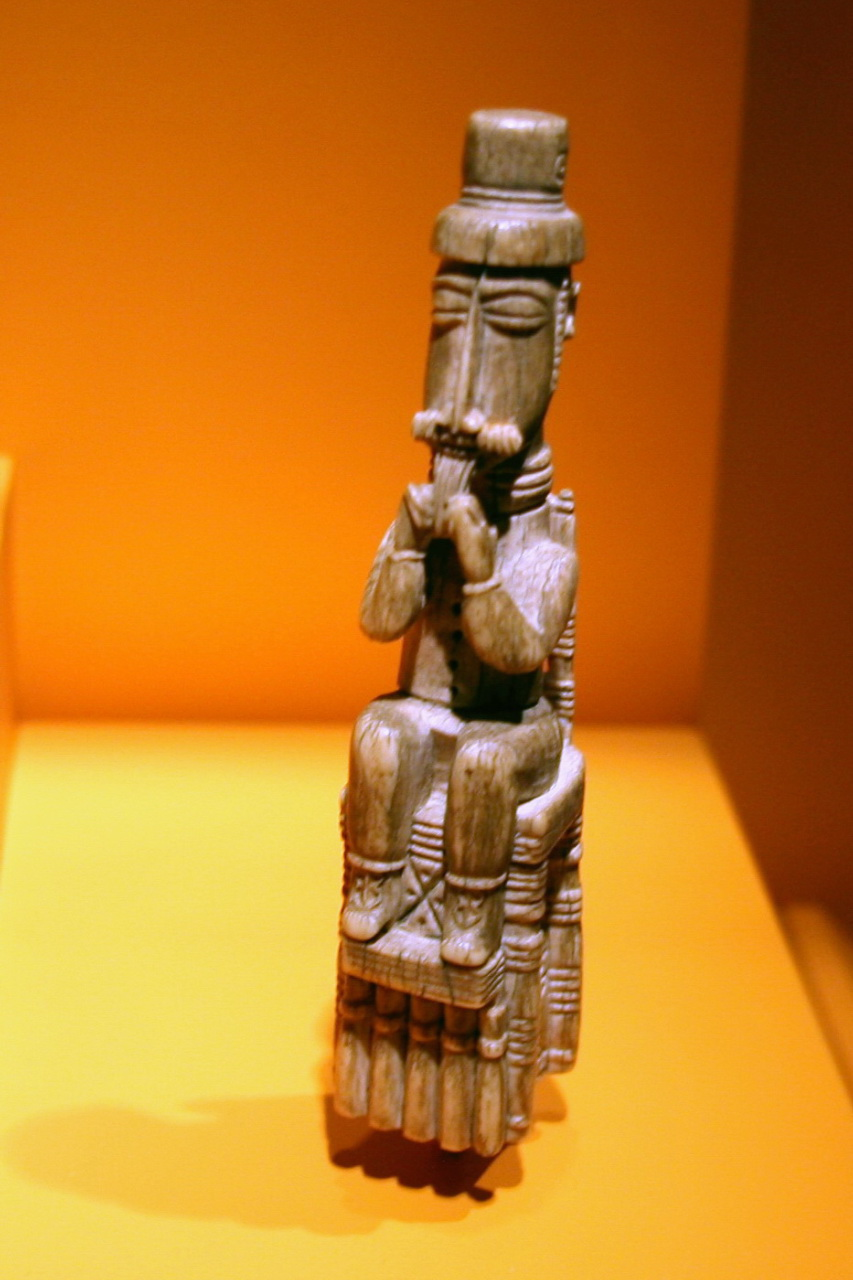
Finial of the Attie people

Before European colonization, the Attié maintained close cultural and commercial relations with neighboring Akan peoples as well as other communities inhabiting southeastern Ivory Coast. Exchanges of agricultural products, forest resources, iron tools and crafted goods linked Attié villages to regional trade networks extending toward the coast.

Attié political life remained decentralized. Individual villages retained considerable autonomy while sharing common customs, language, and religious traditions with other Akan groups. Chiefs, lineage elders and ritual authorities collectively regulated disputes, managed communal lands and oversaw important ceremonies.

The absence of a centralized kingdom did not prevent cooperation between communities. Villages frequently formed temporary alliances for mutual defense, trade, or the resolution of regional disputes.

=== French colonial rule ===
During the late nineteenth century, France expanded its control over the territories that became Ivory Coast. Attié lands were gradually incorporated incorporated into the French colonial administration through military expeditions and administrative reorganization.

Colonial rule significantly altered Attié society. Traditional political institutions continued to exist but increasingly operated under supervision of colonial officials. New roads connected Attié villages to emerging commercial centers, while missionary activity contributed to the spread of Christianity.

The colonial administration also encouraged the cultivation of export crops, particularly cocoa and coffee, transforming local agricultural practices and integrating Attié communities into the colonial economy.

=== Since independence ===
Following the independence of Ivory Coast in 1960, the Attié became fully integrated into the country's political and administrative system. Economic development and the rapid expansion of Abidjan brought increased urbanization to traditionally Attié areas, resulting in greater migration between rural villages and the capital region.

Despite these changes, the Attié have maintained a distinct cultural identity through the continued use of the Attié language,traditional festivals,customary leadership and community institutions. Agriculture continues to play an important role in many Attié communities,although increasing numbers are employed in urban occupations.
