= JWI =

JWI or jwi may refer to:

- Jewish Women International, a Jewish-American social service organization
- jwi, the ISO 639-3 code for Jwira-Pepesa language, Ghana
