= Agotime language =

Ghana–Togo Mountain language

Agotime
- Adangbe
- Native to: Togo, Ghana
- Region: Sassanou
- Ethnicity: Adan, Agotime
- Native speakers: 4,000 (2012)
- Language family: Niger–Congo?: Atlantic–Congo; Kwa; Ka-Togo; Kposo–Ahlo ?; Agotime

Language codes
- ISO 639-3: adq
- Glottolog: adan1248

Agotime, or Adangbe, is one of the Ghana–Togo Mountain languages (GTM) of the Kwa family. It is spoken by the Adan and Agotime, and also goes by the name Adangbe (Dangbe), which is a variant of the name Adangme (Dangme). It is not included in the list of GTM languages maintained by Roger Blench, unless it is a variety of Ahlo (Ago, Igo);
