= Selee =

Selee may refer to:

- Selee language, a language of Ghana
- Frank Selee (1859–1909), American baseball manager
