= Boro language (Ghana) =

Extinct language of Ghana

Boro
- Native to: Ghana
- Region: central eastern Ghana
- Extinct: 19th century
- Language family: Niger–Congo?: (unclassified); Atlantic–Congo ?; Kwa ?; Ghana–Togo Mountain ?; Boro

Language codes
- ISO 639-3: xxb
- Glottolog: boro1283

Boro is an extinct language once spoken in central eastern Ghana. In the vicinity of Worawora and Tapa, Rudolf Plehn found one old man who could still remember some words of this language, which according to him was spoken by more people in his younger years. The language is only known from the 12 lexical items collected by Plehn around the end of the 19th century and published in Seidel (1898). Westermann (1922) classified it as one of the Togorestsprachen, a classification followed by Glottolog, while Heine (1968:300) leaves it unclassified.

== See also ==
- Ghana–Togo Mountain languages
