= Ghana Concert Party Theater =

Ghana's concert party theater is a known traveling theater performing in rural and urban cities with itinerant actors staging vernacular shows and a tradition of the twentieth century in West Africa.

== History ==
The Ghanaian Concert party is an art genre that emerged in sub-Saharan Africa amalgamating local and foreign elements;using material from American movies, Latin gramophone records, African-American spirituals and highlife songs. The actors were in make-up and played the role of Ananse the trickster character of Ghanaian story telling. The language was changed to Ghanaian languages as sketches which mocked Europeans living in Africa were replaced with Ghanaian cultural nationalism.

This style of art was distinctive features expressing identities, aesthetics, symbols and underlying value orientations of African practitioners and audience. The concert parties were made up of professional group of actors that combined slapstick musical comedies, folk stories, acrobatics, moral sermons, magical displays and dance-music sessions.

Ghana's first concert actor was Teacher Yalley, headmaster of Sekondi Elementary school. As early as 1903 Two Mac's performed for the black and white elite at a costume ball and concert at Cape Castle.
