= Nkonya =

Coordinates: 5°56′N 1°55′W

- Interactive map of Nkonya
- Country: Ghana
- Region: Oti Region

Nkonya is a town in the Oti Region of Ghana. As a state, it consists of nine towns namely Ahenkro, Asakyiri, Betenase, Kadjebi, Ntsumuru, Ntumda, Tayi, Tepo and Wurupong. The town is known for the Nkonya Senior High School. The school is a second cycle institution.

The languages spoken in the town and the area are the Nkonya and French languages.
