= Kabye people =

Gurunsi ethnic group of northern Togo

Total population
- 1,439,000

Regions with significant populations
- Togo: 1,372,000
- Ghana: 52,000
- Benin: 15,000

Languages
- Kabiye language

Religion
- Animism and Christianity

Related ethnic groups
- Logba people

The Kabye (also known as Kabiye, Kabre, Cabrai), are a people living in the north central mountains and northern plains of Togo. They speak the Kabiye language. The Kabye are primarily known for farming and cultivation of harsh, dry, infertile lands of Togo. They grow cotton, millet and yams.

Kabye people also live in northwestern Benin near the Togolese border. The Logba or Lugba people of Benin are closely related to the Kabye. Broadly defined and subgroups included, the Kabiye people are the second largest ethnic group in Togo after the Ewe people, and they dominate the Togolese government and military.

== Society and culture ==
The Kabye are a patrilineal society that has been primarily devoted to subsistence farming. In contemporary economy, many are migrant labor.

=== Evala wrestling ===
Evala is a form of traditional wrestling practised mainly by the Kabyé of northern Togo, in West Africa. Competitors meet yearly at a festival following a retreat marking the initiation of young men into adulthood.

Evala is the penultimate element of this initiation rite, during which young men are separated from their families for one week, residing in special huts where they are fed and subject to mental training. Prior to wrestling, participants go on a pilgrimage which involves climbing three mountains; those who do not complete it are not initiated into adulthood. Although wrestlers are initiated regardless of whether they win or not, losing is considered shameful to the family name. The last of these initiation rites is circumcision.

== Notable people ==
The country's former president, Gnassingbé Eyadema, who took power in a coup, was of Kabye ethnicity. Togo is now led by Eyadema's son, Faure Gnassingbé.

Angèle Patassé, the Togolese-born former First Lady of the Central African Republic, was also a member of the Kabye people.
