= Kposo people =

Ethnic group living in Ghana and Togo

Kposo
Akposo

Total population
- 162,000

Regions with significant populations
- Plateau Region (Togo), Ghana

Languages
- Kposo

Religion
- Predominately Catholicism

The Kposo or Akposso people (Kposo: Akpɔsɔ) are an ethnic group living in the Plateau Region of southern Togo, west of Atakpamé, and across the border in Ghana. Their ethnic language is Kposo or Ikposo.

== Economy ==
Akposso farmers grow cocoa and coffee as cash crops. Traditional crops include yams, maize "(ɖzukklɔ)"and fonio.

== Culture ==
The traditional Akposso calendar has five days in each week. These are Imle, Ekpe, Ewle, Eyla, and Eva.

Fonio (Kposo: ɔva) is culturally important. An annual festival called "Ovazu" (Kposo: Ɔvazu) is held around harvest time, and in Togo it is held together with the Akebus.
