= Pɛrɛ language =

Endangered Volta-Congo language of Ivory Coast

Pɛrɛ
- Mbre
- Native to: Ivory Coast
- Region: Marabadiassa
- Native speakers: 50 (2017)
- Language family: Niger–Congo?: Atlantic–Congo; Volta–Congo; (unclassified); Pɛrɛ

Language codes
- ISO 639-3: mka
- Glottolog: mbre1244
- ELP: Mbre

Pɛrɛ or Mbre is a moribund language of the Ivory Coast.

It is known as Pɛrɛ [also rendered Prɛ] by its speakers and as Bɛrɛ [also rendered Brɛ] by the locally dominant Koro people.

Pɛrɛ was first described in an unpublished manuscript by Denis Creissels. A grammar, dictionary and texts have been published by Jeffrey Heath and Brahima Tioté.

== Sociolinguistic situation ==
Pɛrɛ is spoken in the village of Bondosso – and marginally in Niantibo – not far from the city of Bouaké, Ivory Coast. Until recently it was also spoken in the village of Kouakoudougou. The speakers are a numu (blacksmith) caste among the Mande.

It had 30 active speakers in 2019 out of an ethnic population that was 700 in the year 2000.

Speakers are shifting to the neighbouring Manding language Koro, and the language has large numbers of Manding loanwords.

== Classification ==
Pɛrɛ does not appear to belong to any of the traditional branches of the Niger–Congo language family. It does not have the verb extensions or noun classes characteristic of the Atlantic–Congo languages. Roger Blench suspects it may form its own branch, though perhaps not far from the Kwa languages.

== Phonology ==
The phonology section below is sourced from Heath & Tioté (2019).

=== Tones ===
There are two tones, a /H/ and /L/, but phonetically /L/ may be realized as mid tone when followed by another /L/. Grammatical use of tone includes the distinction between perfective and imperfective aspect.

=== Vowels ===
There are seven vowel qualities /i e ɛ a ɔ o u/, with an ATR distinction in the mid vowels, but no vowel harmony. All seven may be long or short, nasal or oral. /CVɾV/ tends to be realized as [CəɾV] for any short vowel.

=== Consonants ===
The consonant inventory is also typical for the area, with marginal /h/ and /ʔ/.

		Labial	Alveolar	Alveopalatal	Velar	Labial velar	Laryngeal
Stop	voiceless	p	t	(c)	k	kp	
Stop	voiced	b	d	ɟ	ɡ	ɡb	
Fricative	voiceless	f	s	(ʃ)			
Fricative	voiced		(z)		(ɣ)		
Rhotic/Tap			ɾ ɾ̃				
Lateral			l				
Nasal		m	n	ɲ	ŋ	ŋm	
Semivowel				j ȷ̃		w w̃	
Aspiration							(h)
Glottal stop							(ʔ)

/CjV/ and /CwV/ sequences occur.

== Grammar ==
Nouns have an "absolute" suffix /a/ that appears at the end of a noun phrase and in citation form. Word order is SVOX. There are phrasal verbs with postpositions.
