= Dwang language =

Guang language of Ghana

Dwang
- Nchumunu
- Native to: Ghana
- Native speakers: 8,200 (2003)
- Language family: Niger–Congo?: Atlantic–Congo; Kwa; Potou–Tano; Tano; Guang; North; Dwang

Language codes
- ISO 639-3: nnu
- Glottolog: dwan1238
- ELP: Dwang

Dwang is a Guang language of Ghana, partially intelligible with Chumburung.
