= Esuma language =

Extinct language of Ivory Coast

Esuma
- Essouma
- (unattested)
- Native to: Ivory Coast
- Region: Assinie-Mafia
- Extinct: ca. 1800
- Language family: Niger–Congo?: Atlantic–Congo; Kwa; (unclassified); Esuma

Language codes
- ISO 639-3: esm
- Glottolog: esum1241

Esuma (Essouma) is an extinct undocumented language of uncertain classification within the Kwa branch of the Niger–Congo family, once spoken in the villages of Assinie (Asini) and Mafia in Ivory Coast. The Esuma were vassals of the Sanwi capital Krinjabo, and shifted to the Anyin and Nzima languages.
