= Banana language =

Banana language may refer to

- the hypothetical Pre-Sumerian substratum language(s)
- a pejorative name for the Massa and Musey languages
- the fictional language spoken by the Minion characters in the Despicable Me media franchise, also known as "Minionese"
