= Ghanaian English =

Variety of English spoken in Ghana

- Region: Ghana
- Language family: Indo-European: Germanic; West Germanic; Ingvaeonic; Anglo-Frisian; Anglic; English; British English & African English; Ghanaian English
- Early forms: Proto-Indo-European: Proto-Germanic; Old English; Middle English; Early Modern English; 19th century British English
- Writing system: Latin (English alphabet); Unified English Braille

Official status
- Official language in: Ghana

Language codes
- ISO 639-3: –
- Glottolog: sout3331

Speech example
An example of Ghanaian English speaker (Felix Nartey).

Ghanaian English is a variety of English spoken in Ghana. English is the official language of Ghana, and is used as a lingua franca throughout the country. English remains the designated language for all official and formal purposes even as there are 11 indigenous government-sponsored languages used widely throughout the country.

== Demographics ==
Of the more than 28 million people in Ghana, 67% of the population can read and write in English, and one-fifth is literate in English exclusively. Primary and secondary school classes at public schools, and schools that prepare for public certificates are taught in English only.

== Phonology ==
Due to Ghana's colonial history, Ghanaian English most closely resembles British English, although it is decidedly varied and deviates from the standard in many ways based on location and context.

In contrast to the twelve monophthongal vowels of Received Pronunciation, Ghanaian English has only seven, an attribute shared with other forms of African English:

Vowel phonemes
	Front	Central	Back
Close	i		u
Close-mid	e		o
Open-mid	ɛ		ɔ
Open		a	

Ghanaian English exhibits several mergers including the fleece–kit, foot–goose, and thought–cloth mergers. Vowels before /n/ are nasalized, often leading to the reduction or loss of the consonant.

In Ghanaian English, the voiceless alveolo-palatal sibilant [ɕ] is the usual realisation of the phoneme /ʃ/ (as in "ship" and "Chicago"), the voiceless alveolo-palatal affricate [tɕ] is the usual realisation of /tʃ/ (as in "cheese" and ""watching") and the voiced alveolo-palatal affricate [dʑ] is the usual realisation of /dʒ/ (as in "general" and "magic").

Ghanaian English features some degree of Th-stopping on word-initial and medial positions, pronouncing the dental fricatives /θ/, /ð/ as alveolar stops /t/, /d/; dental stops /t̪/, /d̪/; or dental affricates /tθ/, /dð/. On word-final positions /θ/ can be fronted to a labiodental fricative /f/. However, significant portions of the population, especially women, maintain these sounds.

Obstruents tend to be de-voiced word-finally, pronouncing Lord as [lɔt] and news as [nius], for example. On the other hand, they can be voiced when inter-vocalically or around voiced consonants, even across word boundaries: pieces [piziz], what about [hwad abaut], first degree [fɛz diɡri].

Ghanaian English is a non-rhotic dialect, and is notable in that it doesn't present linking or intrusive R. The /r/ phoneme is realized as [ɻ], due to influence from Akan. L-vocalization or reduction is present at times when one would see syllabic l: available [avelabuˡ], apple [apɔ], with the preceding vowel velarizing to /ɔ/ or /u/ when /l/ is reduced. This phenomenon also occurs on other occasions: will [wɔˡ ~ wuˡ], shall [ʃa].

Perhaps due to Scottish influence, the wine-whine merger isn't present in Ghanaian English, so words with wh- are rendered [hw].

== See also ==
- Commonwealth English

== Bibliography ==
- Huber, Magnus (2004), "Ghanaian English: phonology", in Schneider, Edgar W.; Burridge, Kate; Kortmann, Bernd; Mesthrie, Rajend; Upton, Clive (eds.), A handbook of varieties of English, vol. 1: Phonology, Mouton de Gruyter, pp. 842–865, ISBN 3-11-017532-0
