= Jwira–Pepesa language =

Niger-Congo language of Ghana

Jwira–Pepesa
- Pepesa–Jwira
- Region: Ghana
- Native speakers: 18,000 (2003)
- Language family: Niger–Congo?: Atlantic–Congo; Kwa; Potou–Tano; Tano; Akan; Bia; South; Jwira–Pepesa
- Dialects: Jwira; Pepesa

Language codes
- ISO 639-3: jwi
- Glottolog: jwir1241

Jwira–Pepesa, also known as Gwira and Pepesa–Jwira, is a Niger-Congo language of the Western Region of Ghana, consisting of the mutually intelligible dialects Jwira and Pepesa, with approximately 18,000 speakers total. It is a Kwa language of the Akan branch, and shares 60% intelligibility with Nzema and partial intelligibility with Ahanta and Anyin. Jwira is spoken in 18 villages from Bamiankaw to Humjibere along the Ankobra River, while Pepesa is spoken on Wasa land between Agona Junction and Tarkwa. The two dialects are separated by a mountain range.

== Orthography ==
Jwira–Pepesa has no written form.
