= Avatime people =

Ethnic group in Ghana

Avatime
Regions with significant populations
- Volta Region, Ghana

Languages
- Avatime and French

Religion
- African traditional religion and Christianity

Related ethnic groups
- Ahanta, other Akan subgroups

The Avatime are an Guan people who live in Volta region of Ghana. History has it that they are Ahanta people who migrated to the Volta region.
