= Animere language =

Language spoken in Ghana

Animere
- Native to: Ghana
- Region: East Central Ghana, Kecheibi and Kunda villages
- Native speakers: 30 (2006)
- Language family: Niger–Congo?: Atlantic–Congo; Kwa; Kebu–Animere; Animere

Language codes
- ISO 639-3: anf
- Glottolog: anim1239
- ELP: Animere

Animere (sometimes Anyimere or Kunda, the latter being a toponym) is a language spoken in Ghana, in the Kecheibe and Kunda villages of the Benimbere people. It is most closely related to Kebu or Akebu of Togo. Both are Ghana Togo Mountain languages (GTM), classified as members of the Ka-Togo group by Heine (1968). Like most other GTM languages, Animere is a noun-class language.

Animere is an endangered language that is no longer being passed on to children; the speaker count is approximately 30 (Blench 2006). Already in 1965 Adele, another GTM language, was the dominant language among the younger generation in the Animere area, and only elderly people spoke Animere among themselves, leading Heine (1968) to expect that 'the language is going to be extinct in a few decades'. Knowledge of Twi, a dominant regional language, is also widespread among the Benimbere.
