= Nawuri language =

Guang language of Ghana

Nawuri
- Native to: Ghana
- Region: Lake Volta
- Native speakers: 14,000 (2003)
- Language family: Niger–Congo?: Atlantic–Congo; Kwa; Potou–Tano; Tano; Guang; North; Nawuri

Language codes
- ISO 639-3: naw
- Glottolog: nawu1242

Nawuri is a Guang language of Ghana. It is nearly intelligible with Kyode.

The Nawuri's are part of the Guan ethnic group in Ghana and are located mainly in two regions: Northern and Oti region of Ghana. They are indigenous in this two regions of Ghana:

- In Northern Ghana, they are located in Kpandai District
- In Oti Region, they are located in the Eastern bank of Oti River running through from Kpassa in Nkwanta North through to Kitare Disane Nkwanta South to Njare in Krachi East, thus the homeland of Nawuri's.

The Nawuri lives in dozen villages around the chief town of Kpandai, at the eastern end of Salaga district; on the west bank of the Volta Lake/Oti River, some 70 kilometers north of Kete Krachi.

Farming is their main occupation. The mothers cut tribal marks on their children when they are 6 months old; names are given by the elders at 6 to 8 months; children are often named after their grandfathers and grandmothers.

An initiation ceremony is conducted for both boys and girls when they are aged 15. They wear special clothing and are questioned to test their maturity.

Traditional belief means in sickness it is usual to go to the soothsayer to find out whether one has offended an ancestor. If so the soothsayer will identify the ancestor concerned and prescribe the necessary sacrifices, which are performed on the ancestor's grave.

Christianity was first introduced to the people in 1944 by the WEC Mission and several denominations now work in the area. The Nawuri are favorable towards Christianity. There are relatively few Muslims in the area at the moment.
