= Logba people =

Ethnic group in Ghana

Logba
Regions with significant populations
- Volta Region, Ghana

Languages
- Logba, French

Related ethnic groups
- Akans

Picture of the main street leading into the mountain village of Logba Tota in the Volta Region of Ghana. The old (now derelict) Chiefs palace is visible on the skyline.

A girl sells produce in Logba

The Logba people live in the Volta Region of Ghana, east of the Volta Lake in the mountains of the Ghana-Togo borderland. Most Logba towns and villages are situated along the trunk road from Accra to Hohoe. They include the following settlements: Wuinta, Akusame, Adiveme, Andokɔfe, Adzakoe, Alakpeti, Klikpo, and Tota. Tota is located high in the Ghana Togo Mountains to the east of the Accra-Hohoe road. Alakpeti is the commercial centre of Logba, while Klikpo is traditionally the seat of the head of the Logba people. They are located in the Afadzato South Constituency in the Volta Region of Ghana. The Logba people are primarily subsistence farmers, producing cassava, maize, yams and forest fruits, supplemented by cash crops like cocoa, coffee and sawn mahogany logs. The Logba area is known for its scenery, which includes waterfalls, cliffs, and limestone formations, including one or two known small caves with minor speleothems.

== Language ==
Logba is a Kwa language. There are approximately 7 500 speakers. The Logba people call themselves Akpana and their language Ikpana, which means ‘defenders of truth’. Logba is different from Lukpa of Togo and Benin, which is also sometimes referred to as Logba.

The dominant language in the region is Ewe, closely followed by Twi. Most Logba people are bilingual in Ewe and French. South of the Logba area live the Avatime people. Logba is only distantly related to its direct neighbours Avatime and Nyagbo-Tafi; according to Bernd Heine (1968) it is more closely related to the Akpafu and Santrokofi languages spoken northwards.

== Origins ==
There have been two hypotheses as to the origin of the Logba people. Heine (1968, following Debrunner), proposed that the Logba are descendants from the makɔ́ people, having fled south after a defeat in the second half of the 18th century. However, the Logba people themselves relate that they have come together with the Gbe peoples from Ketu. The latter view is advanced also by Dorvlo (2004).
