= Nkonya language =

Guang language of Ghana

Nkonya
- Native to: Ghana
- Native speakers: 20,000 (2013)
- Language family: Niger–Congo?: Atlantic–Congo; Kwa; Potou–Tano; Tano; Guang; North; Nkonya

Language codes
- ISO 639-3: nko
- Glottolog: nkon1245

Nkonya is a Guang language spoken by the people of Nkonya in the Biakoye District of the Oti Region of Ghana. A phonology and a dictionary are available.

== Sources ==
- Brigitte Reineke: The structure of the Nkonya language. Verlag Enzyklopädie, Leipzig 1972.
