= Attié language =

Kwa language spoken in Ivory Coast

Attié
- Native to: Ivory Coast
- Ethnicity: Attie people
- Native speakers: 642,000 (2017)
- Language family: Niger–Congo?: Atlantic–Congo; Volta–Congo; Kwa; Attié

Language codes
- ISO 639-3: ati
- Glottolog: atti1239

Attié (Akie, Akye, Atche, Atie, Atshe) is a language of uncertain classification within the Kwa branch of the Niger–Congo family. It is spoken by perhaps half a million people in Ivory Coast.

== Phonology ==
=== Consonants ===
| | | Labial | Alveolar | Palatal | Velar | Labio- velar | Glottal |
|---|---|---|---|---|---|---|---|
| Nasal | | m | [n] | [ɲ] | [ŋ] | [ŋw] | |
| Plosive | voiceless | p | t | c | k | k͡p | |
| Plosive | voiced | b | d | ɟ | ɡ | ɡ͡b | |
| Affricate | voiceless | | t͡s | t͡ʃ | | | |
| Affricate | voiced | | (d͡z) | d͡ʒ | | | |
| Fricative | voiceless | f | s | ʃ | | | h |
| Fricative | voiced | v | z | | | | |
| Approximant | | | | j | | w | |
| Lateral | | | l | | | | |
| Trill | | | (r) | | | | |

- /z/ may also be heard as an affricate [d͡z] in free variation among speakers.
- /l/ may also be heard as [r] when following consonants.
- Nasal sounds [n, ɲ, ŋ~ŋw] only occur as a result of sounds /l, j, w/ occurring in nasal positions when preceding or following nasal vowels.
- /h/ in nasal positions occurs as [h̃].
- /w/ may be realized as labio-palatal [ɥ] when occurring after palatal sounds /t͡ʃ, d͡ʒ, ɟ/.

=== Vowels ===
Oral vowels
| | Front | Central | Back |
|---|---|---|---|
| High | i | | u |
| High-mid | e | ɨ | o |
| Low-mid | ɛ | ə | ɔ |
| Low | | a | |

Sounds /ɨ, ə/ are phonetically heard as [ɨ̞, ɘ] or [ə̞, ɜ].

Nasal vowels
| | Front | Central | Back |
|---|---|---|---|
| High | ĩ | | ũ |
| Low-mid | ɛ̃ | ə̃ | ɔ̃ |
| Low | | ã | |

== Writing system ==
Attié Alphabet
| a | an | b | c | d | dzh | e | ë | ën | ɛ |
| ɛn | f | g | gb | h | i | in | j | k | kp |
| l | m | n | o | ö | ɔ | ɔn | p | r | s |
| sh | t | ts | tsh | u | un | v | w | y | z |

A vowel followed by <n> indicates nasalisation.

Tones are indicated with a diacritic before or after the syllable :

Tone notation
| Tone | Sign | Writing | Example | Translation |
|---|---|---|---|---|
| Low | hyphen before syllable | ˗ | ˗ka | thing |
| Mid | nothing | ∅ | wu | acheke |
| High | apostrophe | ʼ | ’mi | mouth |
| Very high | double apostrophe | ˮ | ˮvin | children |
| Falling | hyphen after syllable | ˗ | be˗ | pestle |
