= Abure language =

Tano language of Ivory Coast

Abure
- Native to: Ivory Coast
- Native speakers: 93,000 (2017)
- Language family: Niger–Congo?: Atlantic–Congo; Kwa; Potou–Tano; Tano; West; Abure

Language codes
- ISO 639-3: abu
- Glottolog: abur1243
- Coordinates: 5°13′0″N 3°38′0″W

Abure (Aboulé), also known as Abonwa or Akaplass, is a Tano language (Kwa, Niger–Congo) spoken near Abidjan in Ivory Coast.

== Phonology ==
Abure consonants
	Labial	Alveolar	Palatal	Velar	Labiovelar	Glottal
Plosive	p b	t d	c ɟ	k	kp gb	
Nasal	m	n	ɲ	ŋ		
Fricative	f v	s				h
Approximant			j			
Lateral		l			w	

Abure vowels
	Front	Central	Back
Close	i ĩ		u ũ
Near-close	ɪ ɪ̃		ʊ ʊ̃
Close-mid	e		o
Open-mid	ɛ		ɔ
Open		a ã	

There are four tones: high, low, rising, and falling.
