= Eotile language =

Tano language of Ivory Coast

Eotile
- Beti
- Native to: Ivory Coast
- Ethnicity: 3,180 (1988 census)
- Native speakers: (200 cited 1999)
- Language family: Niger–Congo?: Atlantic–Congo; Kwa; Potou–Tano; Tano; West; Eotile

Language codes
- ISO 639-3: eot
- Glottolog: beti1248
- ELP: Beti

Eotile, or Beti, is a nearly extinct Tano language of Ivory Coast. Speakers are shifting to Anyin, with remaining Eotile speakers heavily influenced by that language. The last speaker of "pure" Eotile is reported to have died in 1993.
