= Alladian language =

Kwa language spoken in Ivory Coast

Alladian
- Native to: Ivory Coast
- Native speakers: (23,000 cited 1993)
- Language family: Niger–Congo?: Atlantic–Congo; Kwa; Avikam–Alladian; Alladian

Language codes
- ISO 639-3: ald
- Glottolog: alla1248

Alladian (Alladyan, Allagia, Allagian) is one of the Lagoon languages of Ivory Coast. It is a Kwa language, closely related to Avikam, but otherwise its position is unclear.

== Phonology ==
=== Consonants ===
The consonants of the Alladian language are shown in the chart below.

		Bilabial		Labiodental		Alveolar		Post- alveolar		Labial–palatal	Palatal		Labial–velar		Velar	
Nasal			m				n				ɲ					
Plosive		p	b			t	d				c	ɟ	k͡p	ɡ͡b	k	g
Affricate																
Fricative				f	v	s	z	ʃ	ʒ							
Approximant	Median									ɥ		j	w			
Approximant	Lateral						l									

The consonant sound /l/ has two allophones; /r/ and /ɾ/.

=== Vowels ===
	Front	Near-front	Back
Close	i		u
Near-close		ɪ	
Close-mid	e, ẽ		o, õ
Open-mid	ɛ, ɛ̃		ɔ, ɔ̃
Open	a, ã		

=== Tones ===
There are two tones. High tone and low tone.
