= Kplang language =

Guang language of Ghana

Kplang
- Native to: Ghana
- Native speakers: 1,600 (2003)
- Language family: Niger–Congo?: Atlantic–Congo; Kwa; Potou–Tano; Tano; Guang; North; Kplang

Language codes
- ISO 639-3: kph
- Glottolog: kpla1238

Kplang is a Guang language of Ghana. It is partially intelligible with Chumburung, especially with the neighboring dialect.
