= Kaleri language =

Kaleri language may refer to:

- Horom language
- Barkul language
