= Cherepon language =

Guang language spoken in Ghana

Kyiripong
- Native to: Ghana
- Native speakers: 110,000 (2003)
- Language family: Niger–Congo?: Atlantic–Congo; Kwa; Potou–Tano; Tano; Guang; South Guang; Kyiripong

Language codes
- ISO 639-3: cpn
- Glottolog: cher1271

Cherepon (Chiripon, Chiripong, Kyiripong), also known as Okere or Ɔkere, is a Guang language spoken by 111,000 in Ghana.

== Phonology ==
=== Consonants ===
Consonants
		Labial	Alveolar	Palatal	Velar	Labial- velar
Plosive	voiceless	p	t		k	k͡p
Plosive	voiced	b	d		g	g͡b
Affricate	voiceless		t͡s	t͡ʃ		
Affricate	voiced			d͡ʒ		
Fricative		f	s			
Nasal		m	n	ɲ	ŋ	
Trill			r			
Approximant		w	l	j		

=== Vowels ===
Oral vowels
	Front	Central	Back
Close	i		u
Near-close	ɪ		ʊ
Close-mid	e		o
Open-mid	ɛ		ɔ
Near-open		æ	
Open		a	

Nasal vowels
	Front	Central	Back
Close	ĩ		ũ
Near-close	ɪ̃		ʊ̃
Open-mid	ɛ̃		ɔ̃
Open		ã	

== Orthography ==
/i, ɪ/ are represented by ⟨i⟩, /ʊ, o/ are represented by ⟨o⟩, and /æ̯, a/ are represented by ⟨a⟩. /n, ɲ, ŋ/ are represented by ⟨n⟩, and /t͡ʃ/ is represented by ⟨ky⟩, e.g., akyibi 'child'.
