= Avikam language =

Lagoon languages of Ivory Coast

Avikam
- Native to: Ivory Coast
- Region: Grand Lahou
- Native speakers: (21,000 cited 1993)
- Language family: Niger–Congo?: Atlantic–Congo; Kwa; Avikam–Alladian; Avikam

Language codes
- ISO 639-3: avi
- Glottolog: avik1243

Avikam is one of the Lagoon languages of Ivory Coast, spoken in Grand Lahou Département, Avikam Canton, South Department. It is a Kwa language, closely related to Alladian, but other than that its position is unclear.

== Phonology ==
Above is the consonant chart and below is the vowel chart.

	Labial	Alveolar	Palatal	Velar	labiovelars
Nasal	[m]	[n]	[ɲ]	[ŋ]	
Plosive	p b	t d	C ɟ	k ɡ	kp gb
Sonorants	ɓ	l	J	Y	w
Fricative	f v	s z	[ʒ]		

	+ATR		-ATR				+ATR		-ATR	
	oral	nas.	oral	nas.	oral	nas.	oral	nas.	oral	nas
High	i	ĩ	ɪ				u	ũ	ʊ	
Mid	e		ɛ	ɛ̃			o		ɔ	ɔ̃
Low					a	ã				

== Sources ==
- Ahoua, F. (2009-01-01). "The Phonology-Syntax Interface in Avikam". Legon Journal of the Humanities. 20: 123–149. ISSN 2458-746X.
