= Chumburung language =

Guang language spoken in Ghana

Chumburung
- Native to: Ghana
- Region: Kpandai District and Yeji
- Native speakers: 69,000 (2004)
- Language family: Niger–Congo?: Atlantic–Congo; Kwa; Potou–Tano; Tano; Guang; North; Chumburung
- Dialects: Yeji

Language codes
- ISO 639-3: ncu
- Glottolog: chum1261

Chumburung (Kyongborong, Nchimburu, Nchummuru) is a Guang or Guan language spoken by 69,000 persons, mostly Chumburu by tribe and living in the Kingdom of Chumburung at both sides of the southwestern leg of Lake Volta in Ghana.

3,000 of these speak the Yeji (Yedji) dialect, which is quite divergent: no closer to Chumburung proper than Kplang or Krache are.
