= Kebu language =

Ghana–Togo Mountain language

Akebu
- Kebu
- Native to: Ghana, Togo
- Native speakers: 70,000 (2012)
- Language family: Niger–Congo?: Atlantic–Congo; Kwa; Kebu–Animere; Akebu

Language codes
- ISO 639-3: keu
- Glottolog: akeb1238

Akebu
- People: Əkpəβə
- Country: Kᵼkpəkə

Akebu or Kebu (also Kabu; in French: akébou) is one of the Ghana–Togo Mountain languages spoken by the Akebu people of southern Togo and southeastern Ghana. It is a tonal language with nominal classes. Akebu is closely related to the Animere language.

In 2002 there were about 56,400 speakers, located primarily in the Akébou district of the Plateau Region of Togo.

== Writing system ==
Kebu alphabet
a	b	c	d	ɖ	e	ə	ɛ	f	g	gb	h	i	ɩ	j	k	kp
l	m	n	ny	ŋ	o	ɔ	p	r	s	t	u	ʊ	v	w	y	z

== Bibliography ==
- Yao Koffi, Akebu-Deutsch-Wörterbuch, Deutsches Akademischen Austauschdienstes, Sarrebruck (Allemagne), 1981, 433 p.
- Yao Koffi, Sprachkontakt und Kulturkontakt : eine Untersuchung zur Mehrsprachigkeit bei den Akebu in Togo, Sarrebruck, 1984, 180 p.
- Jacques Sossoukpe, Vitalité ethnolinguistique suivie d'une esquisse phonologique de l'Akébou, Lomé (Togo), 2008.
