= Larteh language =

Guang language spoken in Ghana

Larteh
- Native to: Ghana
- Region: Anum, Lete, Chiripon
- Native speakers: 74,000 (2003)
- Language family: Niger–Congo?: Atlantic–Congo; Kwa; Potou–Tano; Tano; Guang; South Guang; Larteh

Language codes
- ISO 639-3: lar
- Glottolog: lart1238

Larteh is a language of southeastern Ghana. It belongs to the Guang subgroup of the Niger–Congo languages and is spoken by about 74,000 people.
