= Abé language =

Kwa language of Ivory Coast

Abé
- Region: Ivory Coast
- Ethnicity: Abbé
- Native speakers: 300,000 (2017)
- Language family: Niger–Congo?: Atlantic–Congo; Kwa; Abé
- Writing system: Latin

Language codes
- ISO 639-3: aba
- Glottolog: abee1242

Abé (also spelled Abbé, Abbey, Abi) is a language of uncertain classification within the Kwa branch of the Niger–Congo family. It is spoken in Ivory Coast.

The dialects of Abé are Tioffo, Morie, Abbey-Ve, and Kos.

In 1995 there were estimated to be 170,000 speakers, primarily in the Department of Agboville.

== Phonology ==
=== Consonants ===
Abé Consonants
	Labial	Alveolar	Palatal	Velar	Glottal	Labiovelar
Voiceless stops	p	t	c	k		kp
Voiced stops	b	d	ɟ			gb
Voiceless fricatives	f	s			h	
Voiced fricatives	v			ɣ		
Nasals	m	n	ɲ			
Laterals		l				
Trill		r				
Glides			j			w

=== Vowels ===
Abé Vowels
	Front ATR	Front RTR	Central	Back ATR	Back ATR
High	i	ɪ		u	ʊ
Mid	e	ɛ	(ə)	o	ɔ
Low			a		

Abé demonstrates a tendency towards vowel harmony, with regard to both placement (front vs. back) and +/-ATR. /a/ does not participate in this system.
