= Ahlon language =

Kwa language spoken in Togo

Ahlon
- Igo
- Native to: Togo
- Region: Sassanou
- Native speakers: 7,600 (2012)
- Language family: Niger–Congo?: Atlantic–Congo; Kwa; Ka-Togo; Kposo–Ahlo; Ahlon

Language codes
- ISO 639-3: ahl
- Glottolog: igoo1238
- ELP: Igo

Ahlon
- People: Ago
- Language: Igo

The Ahlon language, Igo, is spoken in the Plateau Region of Togo. It is considered one of the Ghana–Togo Mountain languages of the Kwa family. Variations of its official name are Achlo, Ahlõ, Ahlo, Ahlon-Bogo, Ahonlan, Anlo.

== Phonology ==
=== Consonants ===
The consonants of the Ahlon language are located in the chart below.

		Bilabial		Labiodental		Alveolar		Post- alveolar		Retroflex	Palatal	Labial–velar		Velar		Glottal
Nasal			m				n				ɲ				ŋ	
Plosive		p	b			t	d			ɖ		k͡p	ɡ͡b	k	g	
Affricate								t̠ʃ	d̠ʒ							
Fricative				f	v	s	z									h
Approximant	Median										j	w				
Approximant	Lateral						l									

=== Vowels ===
	Front	Back
Close	i	u
Close-mid	e	o
Open-mid	ɛ	ɔ
Open	a	

=== Tones ===
Ahlon has 3 tones. /˦/ for high tone, /˨/ for low tone, and /˧/ for mid tone.
