= Dompo language =

Language of Ghana

Dompo
- Native to: Ghana
- Region: Banda District
- Extinct: after 2020
- Language family: Niger–Congo?: Atlantic–Congo?; Kwa?; Potou–Tano?; Tano?; Guang?; Dompo

Language codes
- ISO 639-3: doy
- Glottolog: domp1238
- ELP: Dompo

Dompo is a recently extinct language of Ghana. Speakers shifted to Nafaanra and Akan. It was spoken adjacent to the main town of the Nafaanra people, namely Banda, Brong-Ahafo Region, Ghana. Blench (2015) reported that it was spoken by 10 households, and by 2020 it had only 6 speakers.

== Classification ==
Dompo has numerous parallels with the Gonja language, but according to Blench (1999) does not appear to be directly related to it. Blench suggests three possibilities:

1. it is a Gonja dialect that has come under heavy external influence;
2. it is a related Guang language that has been relexified, largely from Gonja;
3. it is of some other source, and relexified, largely from Gonja.

None of the Dompo names for wild plants or animals resemble Gonja, suggesting that the last is the most likely. Some Dompo animal names show resemblances with Mpra.

However, Gueldemann (2018) finds the Guang/Gonja connection to be overwhelming:

[Blench's] conclusion is hard to understand after a superficial comparison of his data with published Gonja material. The specific similarities to this Guang language, many of which Blench fails to identify and which include all available numerals and pronouns, are so numerous and diagnostic that the classificatory assessment in the Ethnologue [an North Guang] is the most plausible hypothesis.

== Sources ==
- Blench, Roger. 1999. Recent Field Work in Ghana: Report on Dompo and a note on Mpre.
- Blench, Roger. 2015. The Dompo language of Central Ghana and its affinities.
