= Kposo language =

Kwa language spoken in Togo and Ghana

Kposo
- Ikpɔsɔ
- Native to: Togo, Ghana
- Region: Volta Region
- Ethnicity: Kposo
- Native speakers: 160,000 (2002)
- Language family: Niger–Congo?: Atlantic–Congo; Kwa; Ka-Togo; Kposo–Ahlo; Kposo

Language codes
- ISO 639-3: kpo
- Glottolog: ikpo1238

Kposo
- People: Akpɔsɔ
- Language: Ikpɔsɔ

Kposo language, or Ikposo (Ikpɔsɔ), is the language of the Akposso people, mainly in the Plateau Region of Togo, west of Atakpamé, but also into eastern Ghana. It is considered one of the Ghana–Togo Mountain languages, but does not have the system of noun classes that is characteristic of other languages in the group.

== Phonology ==
=== Consonants ===
| | | Labial | Alveolar | Palatal | Velar | Labiovelar | Glottal |
|---|---|---|---|---|---|---|---|
| Nasal | | m | n | ɲ | ŋ | | |
| Plosive/ Affricate | voiceless | p | t | t͡ʃ | k | k͡p | |
| Plosive/ Affricate | voiced | b | d | d͡ʒ | ɡ | ɡ͡b | |
| Fricative | voiceless | f | s | | | | h |
| Fricative | voiced | v | z | | (ɣ) | | |
| Approximant | | ɥ | | j | ɰ | w | |
| Lateral | | | l | | | | |
| Trill | | | r | | | | |

- /ɰ/ may also be heard as a fricative [ɣ] sound in free variation.

=== Vowels ===
| | Front | | Central | | Back | |
| | +ATR | -ATR | +ATR | -ATR | +ATR | -ATR |
|---|---|---|---|---|---|---|
| High | i | ɪ | | | u | ʊ |
| Non-high | e | ɛ | ə | a | o | ɔ |
