= Siwu language =

Kwa language spoken in Ghana

Siwu
- Siwusi
- Native to: Ghana
- Region: Volta Region, north of Hohoe
- Native speakers: 27,000 (2003)
- Language family: Niger–Congo?: Atlantic–Congo; Kwa; Na-Togo; Lelemi; Siwu
- Dialects: Akpafu; Lolobi

Language codes
- ISO 639-3: akp
- Glottolog: siwu1238

- People: Mawu
- Language: Siwu
- Country: Kawu

Siwu is a language that is spoken in the mountainous central part of the Volta Region of Ghana. It belongs to the geographic group of Ghana Togo Mountain languages (traditionally called the Togorestsprachen or Togo Remnant languages) of the Kwa branch of Niger–Congo. The speakers of Siwu call themselves the Mawu and their land Kawu. Some of the speakers of Siwu lives around Lolobi communities.

== Geography and demography ==
Siwu is spoken in a total of eight villages scattered about in the mountains north of Hohoe. Estimates of the total number of speakers range between 10,000 and 23,000. Kawu is divided into Akpafu (West) and Lolobi (East), corresponding to a dialectal division. The five Akpafu towns are Tɔdzi, Ɔdɔmi, Mempeasem, Sɔkpoo, and Adɔkɔ. They are all within some 8 kilometres from each other as the bird flies, with the former three clustering on the Western side of the Akpafu range, and the latter two on the opposite side of that range. The three Lolobi towns Kumasi, Ashiambi, and Huyeasem are much closer to each other; they are located in the less mountainous area northeast of Hohoe.

The speakers of Siwu are peasant farmers, with most of them having several small plots of land at walking distance (30 minutes - 2 hours) where they grow rice, cocoa, corn, cassava, yam, plantain, and some other crops. Corn and cassava are relatively recent introductions, whereas rice has been grown from time immemorial. The indigenous species of upland rice (Oryza glabberima) is very close to Mawu identity. The men sometimes have day-jobs in neighbouring towns, while the women sell farm produce in the markets.

The Mawu take pride in an indigenous iron industry which thrived for centuries but which eventually collapsed toward the end of the nineteenth century due at least in part to the influx of cheaply produced European steel. Remains of iron digging and forging activities can still be seen in Akpafu-Tɔdzi, the oldest Mawu town and the only one that is still atop the mountain.

== Classification ==
Siwu has traditionally been grouped with some twelve other geographically isolated languages in the area under the heading Ghana–Togo Mountain languages

(formerly Togorestsprachen or 'Togo Remnant languages'), although it has been noted that this grouping is based on a few broad typological and demographic considerations more than on thorough comparative research (Blench 2001). It has never been disputed however that the language is part of the Kwa branch of Niger–Congo, Africa's largest language family. Within the Ghana–Togo Mountain Languages, the closest relatives of Siwu are Lεlεmi (Buem), Sεlε (Santrokofi), and Sεkpεlε (Likpe); with Siwu, these languages form a group that has been called the Buem group (Heine 1969). Ikpana (Logba) is somewhat further removed both geographically and linguistically.

== Language ==
The first published traces of Siwu (Akpafu) date back to the 1890s, when German missionaries and colonial officials started exploring the Hinterland of their protectorate Togoland. In an early ethnographic study of the wider area (Plehn 1898) we find what is probably the first Siwu to appear in print: two songs and a bit of vocabulary related to houses and buildings. Since then, fragments have been published here and there, but by and large Siwu remains undescribed.

Early German sources besides Plehn are Seidel (1899), Funke (1920), and Westermann (1922). Important linguistic work was done in the 1970s by Kevin Ford in collaboration with Robert Iddah, a speaker of Lolobi, but most of this remains unpublished (Ford & Iddah 1973, 1987). In recent years, a sketch of phonology and morphosyntax has been prepared at GILLBT by Andy Ring and associates. Some linguistic material can furthermore be found in various publications by Kofi Agawu on Northern Ewe and Akpafu ethnomusicology.

Siwu has seven oral and five nasal vowels. Several languages of the region have 8- or 9-vowel systems with some form of vowel harmony. In Siwu, noun class prefixes do not harmonize, but root-internally there are some constraints on vowel co-occurrences, attesting to the earlier presence of a system of cross-height vowel harmony (Ford 1973). Siwu is a tonal language with three level tones on the surface: High, Mid, Low. Functional load of tone is high in the lexicon (minimal pairs) as well as in the grammar (tenses marked by tone).

Basic constituent order in Siwu is subject–verb–object. The language has an elaborate system of noun classification, with about 9 singular/plural pairings of prefixes and a class for mass nouns. Concord with these noun classes usually shows up on the verb and on the numerals 1–7, relatives, and demonstratives.

== Writing system ==
Alphabet
a	b	d	dz	ɖ	e	ɛ	f	g	gb	ɣ	h	i	k	kp
l	m	n	ny	o	ɔ	p	r	s	t	ts	u	v	w	y
