= Ahanta language =

Niger-Congo language of Ghana

Ahanta
- Anyinda
- Region: Ghana
- Ethnicity: Guan
- Native speakers: 180,000 (2013)
- Language family: Niger–Congo?: Atlantic–Congo; Kwa; Potou–Tano; Tano; Guan; Bia; South; Ahanta
- Writing system: Latin

Language codes
- ISO 639-3: aha
- Glottolog: ahan1243

Ahanta is a Guan language, spoken along the southwest coast of Ghana between the cities of Takoradi and Kasoa.

== Phonology ==
=== Consonants ===
The consonantal phonemes of the Ahanta language are found in the chart below.

| | | Bilabial | Labiodental | Dental | | Alveolar | | Post- alveolar | Palatal | | Labial–velar | Velar | | Glottal |
|---|---|---|---|---|---|---|---|---|---|---|---|---|---|---|
| Nasal | | m | | | | | n | | ɲ | | | | ŋ | |
| Plosive | | b | | t̪ | d̪ | | | | | | | k | g | |
| Affricate | | | | | | | | | cç | ɟʝ | k͡p | | | |
| Fricative | | | f | | | s | | ʃ | | | | | | h |
| Approximant | Median | | | | | | | | | j | w | | | |
| Approximant | Lateral | | | | | | l | | | | | | | |
| Labialized | | | | | | | | ʃʷ | ɲʷ, cçʷ, ɟʝʷ | | | ɡʷ | | |

=== Vowels ===
| | Front | Near-front | Near-back | Back |
|---|---|---|---|---|
| Close | i | | | u |
| Near-close | | ɪ | ʊ | |
| Close-mid | e | | | o |
| Open-mid | ɛ | | | ɔ |
| Open | a | | | |

The vowels that can be nasalized are /ĩ/, /ã/, /ũ/, /ɪ̃/, and /ʊ̃/.

=== Tones ===
Ahanta has two tones. High tone and low tone.
