= Krache language =

Guang language of Ghana

Krache
- Native to: Ghana
- Native speakers: 83,000 (2017)
- Language family: Niger–Congo?: Atlantic–Congo; Kwa; Potou–Tano; Tano; Guang; North; Krache

Language codes
- ISO 639-3: kye
- Glottolog: krac1238

Krache (Krachi, Krakye) is a Guang language spoken by 58,000 in Ghana.
