= Logba language =

Kwa language of Ghana

Logba
- Ikpana
- Native to: Ghana
- Region: Volta Region, north-west of Ho
- Ethnicity: Logba people
- Native speakers: 7,500 (2003)
- Language family: Niger–Congo?: Atlantic–Congo; Kwa; Na-Togo; Logba

Language codes
- ISO 639-3: lgq
- Glottolog: logb1245
- ELP: Logba

Logba
- People: Akpanawò
- Language: Ikpana

Logba is a Kwa language spoken in the south-eastern Ghana by approximately 7,500 people. The Logba people call themselves and their language Ikpana, which means ‘defenders of truth’. Logba is different from Lukpa of Togo and Benin, which is also sometimes referred to as Logba.

== Classification ==
The first published treatment of Logba was a short grammar by Diedrich Hermann Westermann (1903). Westermann included Logba in his group of Togo Restsprachen (Togo Remnant languages), a terminology adopted by several subsequent researchers. Dakubu and Ford (1988) renamed this cluster the Central Togo languages but since Ring (1995) they are commonly referred to as Ghana–Togo Mountain languages. The dozen or so Ghana–Togo Mountain languages are part of the Kwa branch of the Niger–Congo family.

== Geography and demography ==
Picture of the main street leading into the mountain village of Logba Tota in the Volta Region of Ghana. The old (now derelict) Chiefs palace is visible on the skyline.

A girl sells produce in Logba

The Logba people live in the Volta Region of Ghana, east of the Volta Lake in the mountains of the Ghana–Togo borderland. Most Logba towns and villages are situated along the trunk road from Accra to Hohoe. They include the following settlements: Wuinta, Akusame, Adiveme, Andokɔfe, Adzakoe, Alakpeti, Klikpo, and Tota. Tota is located high in the Ghana–Togo Mountains to the east of the Accra–Hohoe road. Alakpeti is the commercial centre of Logba, while Klikpo is traditionally the seat of the head of the Logba people. The Logba people are primarily subsistence farmers, producing cassava, maize, yams and forest fruits, supplemented by cash crops like cocoa, coffee and sawn mahogany logs. The Logba area is known for its scenery, which includes waterfalls, cliffs, and limestone formations, including one or two known small caves with minor speleothems.

The dominant language in the region is Ewe, closely followed by Twi. Most Logba people are bilingual in Ewe. South of the Logba area live the Avatime people. Logba is only distantly related to its direct neighbours Avatime and Nyagbo-Tafi; according to Bernd Heine (1968) it is more closely related to the Akpafu and Santrokofi languages spoken northwards.

It is generally agreed that the Logba people are not the original inhabitants of the area they now reside in. There have been two hypotheses as to the origin of the Logba people. Heine (1968, following Debrunner), proposed that the Logba are descendants from the makɔ́ people, having fled south after a defeat in the second half of the 18th century.

== Phonology ==
Logba has a nine vowel system with ATR vowel harmony. Vowel harmony in Logba is root-controlled, which means that the vowels of its nominal prefixes harmonize with the vowels of the root. Vowels are nasalized when they occur in the immediate environment of a nasal consonant.

[-ATR] vowels in Logba
.	Front	Central	Back
Near-close	ɪ		ʊ
Open-mid	ɛ		ɔ
Open		a

[+ATR] vowels in Logba
.	Front	Central	Back
Close	i		u
Close-mid	e		o
Open		a

Logba is a tonal language with two level tones: High and Low. These tones can be combined on one syllable, yielding a Rising or Falling contour tone.

All syllables are open in Logba. Every syllable bears a tone. The basic syllable structure can be rendered as (C_{1})(C_{2})V+T, where C = consonant, V = vowel or syllabic nasal, and T = tone. Dorvlo (2004) distinguishes three types of syllables:

1. Nucleus only, consisting of a vowel or a syllabic nasal. This type is found only in pronouns and nominal prefixes. Examples: ɛ́-mɔ́ 'they laughed'; ɔ́-zɔ́ 'he/she went'; n-dà 'liquor'.
2. Onset and nucleus. This is the most common syllabe type in Logba; most words are of this form. In multisyllabic words, it can occur in all positions. Examples: bà ‘come’; gbà ‘sweep’; bìsí ‘cola nut’
3. Complex onset and nucleus. Only /r/ and /l/ occur as the second consonant of the complex onset. This syllable type can also form a word by itself. In multisyllabic words, in can occur in all positions. Examples: à-klɔ́ ‘goat’; trò ‘refuse’; ìvàflí ‘(thing) white’.

=== Consonants ===
The consonants of Logba are as follows:

		Labial	Alveolar	Retroflex	Palatal	Velar	Labio- Velar	Glottal
Plosive	voiceless		t	ɖ		k	kp	
Plosive	voiced	b	d			g	gb	
Fricative	voiceless	f	s			x		ɦ
Fricative	voiced	v	z					
Affricate	voiceless		ts					
Affricate	voiced		dz					
Nasal		m	n					
Approximant			l		j		w	

s, z, ts, and dz are palatalized to ʃ, ʒ, tʃ, and dʒ respectively, when they occur before i. In the Tota dialect, t and d are pronounced as ts and dz before u.

=== Tone ===
Logba is a tonal language with two tones, high and low. There are a few words which have rising tone, all of which are either loanwords such as zenklǎ (pot stand), a loan from Ewe, or are ideophonic, such as tǒ (to fell palm trees), which imitates the sound of a palm tree falling. Monosyllabic verbs which have a low tone in their uninflected form gain high tone when inflected.

== Notes and references ==
=== Notes ===
1. See for example Heine (1968). Dorvlo (2005) indicates that Logba people who understand the meaning of the term feel uncomfortable with this terminology.
2. Heine (1968:30fn8) is aware of the oral history of the Logba but dismisses this account, professedly because Westermann did not write anything about it. See also Gbe languages#History.
3. /gb/ is not a sequence of /g/ and /b/; it is a digraph for the labio-velar stop, a double articulation common in many African languages.
