= Bowili language =

Language of Ghana

Bowili
- Tuwuli
- Native to: Ghana
- Region: Volta Region
- Native speakers: 11,000 (2003)
- Language family: Niger–Congo?: Atlantic–Congo; Kwa; Ka-Togo; Avatime–Nyangbo; Bowili

Language codes
- ISO 639-3: bov
- Glottolog: tuwu1238
- ELP: Tuwuli

- People: Bawuli
- Language: Tuwuli

The Bowili (Bowiri) language, Tuwuli (Liwuli, Siwuri, Tuwili, Tora), is spoken in the Volta Region of Ghana. It is considered one of the Ghana–Togo Mountain languages of the Kwa family.
