= Lelemi language =

Language of Ghana

Lelemi
- Lefana
- Native to: Ghana
- Region: Jasikan
- Ethnicity: Buem
- Native speakers: 72,000 (2017)
- Language family: Niger–Congo?: Atlantic–Congo; Kwa; Na-Togo; Lelemi languages; Lelemi

Language codes
- ISO 639-3: lef
- Glottolog: lele1264

Lelemi or Lefana (Lε-lεmi, Lε-fana) is spoken by the Buem people in the mountainous Volta Region of Ghana. It belongs to the geographic group of Ghana Togo Mountain languages (traditionally called the Togorestsprachen or Togo Remnant languages) of the Kwa branch of Niger–Congo.

== Phonology ==
=== Consonants ===
		Labial	Alveolar	Palatal	Velar	Labio- velar	Glottal
Nasal		m	n	ɲ	ŋ		
Plosive/ Affricate	voiceless	p	t	t͡ʃ	k	k͡p	
Plosive/ Affricate	voiced	b	d	d͡ʒ	ɡ	ɡ͡b	
Fricative	voiceless	f	s				h
Fricative	voiced	v					
Approximant			l	j		w	
Trill			r				

- /b/ may also be heard as an implosive [ɓ] in word-initial position.
- /f/ may have a variety of allophones when preceding /w/. Most notably a bilabial fricative [ɸ]. Although occasionally also as pharyngeal [ħ] and glottal [h] fricatives among different speakers.

=== Vowels ===
	Front	Central	Back
High	i		u
Near-high	ɪ		ʊ
High-mid	e		o
Low-mid	ɛ		ɔ
Low		a	
