= Adele language =

Language of Ghana and Togo

Adele
- Gidire
- Region: Ghana and Togo
- Native speakers: 37,000 (2003–2012)
- Language family: Niger–Congo?: Atlantic–Congo; Kwa; Anii–Adere; Adele

Language codes
- ISO 639-3: ade
- Glottolog: adel1244

Adele
- People: Bidire
- Language: Gidire

The Adele language is spoken in central eastern Ghana and central western Togo. It belongs to the geographic group of Ghana Togo Mountain languages (traditionally called the Togorestsprachen or Togo Remnant languages) of the Kwa branch of Niger–Congo. The speakers themselves, the Adele people, call the language Gidire.

== Phonology ==
=== Vowels ===
	Front	Central	Back
Close	i	ɨ	u
Mid	ɛ	ə	ɔ
Open		a	

=== Consonants ===
		Bilabial	Alveolar	Palatal	Velar	Glottal
Nasal		m	n	ɲ	ŋ	
Plosive/ Affricate	voiceless	p	t	t͜ɕ	k	
Plosive/ Affricate	voiced	b	d	d͜ʑ	ɡ	
Fricative			s			h
Approximant			l	j	w	
Trill			r			

== Writing system ==
In Ghana, the Ghana Institute of Linguistics, Literacy and Bible Translation (GILLBT) developed an alphabet to translate the Bible into Adele.

Adele alphabet (Ghana)
A	B	Bw	D	E	Ɛ	F	Fw	G	Gb	Gy	H	I	Ɩ	K	Kp	Ky	Kw	L	M	N	Ny	Ŋ	Ŋm	Ŋw	O	Ɔ	P	Pw	R	S	T	U	Ʋ	W	Y
a	b	bw	d	e	ɛ	f	fw	g	gb	gy	h	i	ɩ	k	kp	ky	kw	l	m	n	ny	ŋ	ŋm	ŋw	o	ɔ	p	pw	r	s	t	u	ʋ	w	y

The Adele alphabet used in Togo is essentially the same, however Rongier uses fewer digraphs at the index of his Adele-French dictionary.

Adele alphabet (Togo)
A	B	C	D	E	Ɛ	F	G	Gb	I	Ɩ	J	K	Kp	L	M	N	Ny	Ŋ	O	Ɔ	P	R	S	U	Ʋ	W	Y
a	b	c	d	e	ɛ	f	g	gb	i	ɩ	j	k	kp	l	m	n	ny	ŋ	o	ɔ	p	r	s	u	ʋ	w	y
