= Ntcham language =

Gur language spoken in Togo and Ghana

Ntcham
- Basari
- Native to: Togo, Ghana
- Ethnicity: Gurma
- Native speakers: 390,000 (2004–2013)
- Language family: Niger–Congo?: Atlantic–Congo; Gur; Northern; Oti–Volta; Gurma; Ntcham
- Writing system: Latin (Basari alphabet); Basari Braille

Language codes
- ISO 639-3: Either: bud – Ntcham aks – Akaselem
- Glottolog: ntch1241

Ntcham, or Basari, is a language of the Gurma people in Togo and Ghana. Akaselem (Tchamba) is frequently listed as a separate language.

== Phonology ==
The phonology used by Chanard and Hartell is given below. Abbott and Cox (1966) had a similar phonology, though the non labial-velar voiceless plosives were analyzed as aspirated, and vowel length was not distinguished. Badie (1995) analyzes /t͡ʃ/ and /d͡ʒ/ as /c/ and /ɟ/ and also includes phonemic /ɱ/, vowel lengths, and nasalized vowels.

=== Consonants ===
Consonants
		Labial	Alveolar	Palatal	Velar	Labial- velar
Plosive/Affricate	voiceless	p	t	tʃ	k	kp
Plosive/Affricate	voiced	b	d	d͡ʒ	g	gb
Fricative		f	s			
Nasal		m	n	ɲ	ŋ	ŋm
Trill			r			
Approximant			l	j		w

=== Vowels ===
Vowels
	Front	Back
Close	i	u
Close-mid	eː	oː
Open-mid		ɔ
Open	a	

=== Tones ===
Ntcham also has high, low, and mid tones.

== Writing system ==
Ntcham Alphabet
Majuscules	A	B	C	D	EE	F	G	GB	I	J	K	KP	L
Minuscules	a	b	c	d	ee	f	g	gb	i	j	k	kp	l
Majuscules	M	N	NY	Ŋ	ŊM	OO	Ɔ	P	S	T	U	W	Y
Minuscules	m	n	ny	ŋ	ŋm	oo	ɔ	p	s	t	u	w	y

Long vowels are indicated by doubling the letter ‹aa, ii, ɔɔ, uu› and two vowels are always long ‹ee, oo›. The tones are represented by acute accents for high tone and grave accents for low tone, on the vowels and the consonants m, n, b, l : ‹ḿ, ń, b́, ĺ›, ‹m̀, ǹ, b̀, l̀›.
