= Santrokofi language =

Language of Ghana

Santrokofi
- Selee
- Sεlεε
- Native to: Ghana
- Region: Oti Region
- Native speakers: 11,000 (2003)
- Language family: Niger–Congo?: Atlantic–Congo; Kwa; Na-Togo; Lelemi; Santrokofi

Language codes
- ISO 639-3: snw
- Glottolog: sele1249
- ELP: Selee

Santrokofi
- Person: Ɔlɛɛ
- People: Balɛɛ
- Language: Sεlεε

Santrokofi or Selee (Sεlεε, name of both people and language) is spoken in the mountainous central part of the Volta Region of Ghana. It belongs to the geographic group of Ghana Togo Mountain languages (traditionally called the Togorestsprachen or Togo Remnant languages) of the Kwa branch of Niger–Congo.
