= Likpe language =

Kwa language spoken in Ghana

Likpe
- Sekpele
- Sεkpεlé
- Native to: Ghana
- Region: Oti Region, north of Hohoe
- Native speakers: 23,000 (2003)
- Language family: Niger–Congo?: Atlantic–Congo; Kwa; Na-Togo; Lelemi; Likpe

Language codes
- ISO 639-3: lip
- Glottolog: sekp1241
- ELP: Sekpele

Likpe
- Person: Ɔkpεlé
- People: Bakpεlé
- Language: Sεkpεlé

Likpe or Sekpele (also Bosele, Mu) is spoken in the mountainous lower part of the Oti Region of Ghana. It belongs to the geographic group of Ghana–Togo Mountain languages (traditionally called the Togorestsprachen or Togo Remnant languages) of the Kwa branch of Niger–Congo.

== Phonology ==
=== Consonants ===
Consonants
		Labial	Alveolar	Palatal	Velar	Labial- velar	Glottal
Plosive/ Affricate	voiceless	p	t	tʃ	k	kp	ʔ
Plosive/ Affricate	voiced	b	d	dʒ	g	gb	
Fricative		f	s	ʃ			
Nasal		m	n	ɲ	ŋ		
Approximant			l	j		w	

- /p/ and /g/ are rare.
- Clusters include ⟨Cl⟩, ⟨Cw⟩, and ⟨Cy⟩.

=== Vowels ===
Oral vowels
	Front		Central	Back
	[-round]	[+round]	Central	Back
Close	i			u
Close-mid	e			o
Open-mid	ɛ	œ		ɔ
Open			a	

Nasal vowels
	Front	Central	Back
Close	ĩ		ũ
Close-mid			õ
Open-mid			ɔ̃
Open		ã	

=== Tones ===
Likpe has three tones: high, low, and mid.
