= Nyangbo-Tafi language =

Ghana–Togo Mountain language

Nyangbo
- Tafi
- Tùtrùgbù (nyb); Tɛ̀gbɔ̀ (tcd)
- Native to: Ghana
- Region: Volta Region
- Native speakers: 11,000 (2003)
- Language family: Niger–Congo?: Atlantic–Congo; Kwa; Ka-Togo; Avatime–Nyangbo; Nyangbo

Language codes
- ISO 639-3: Either: nyb – Nyangbo tcd – Tafi
- Glottolog: nyan1316

Nyangbo
- People: Batrugbu
- Language: Tùtrùgbù

Tafi
- People: Bàgbɔ̀
- Language: Tɛ̀gbɔ̀

The Nyangbo-Tafi language is spoken in the Volta Region of Ghana. It is considered one of the Ghana–Togo Mountain languages of the Kwa family.

It consists of two distinct varieties which Ethnologue treats as separate languages, Nyangbo (Tutrugbu) and Tafi (Tegbo). The differences are reported to be only phonological but people without prior contact have only 67% intelligibility with the other variety.

== Sources ==
- Bobuafor, Mercy (2013). A grammar of Tafi (Doctoral thesis). Utrecht: LOT (Leiden University). hdl:1887/20916. ISBN 9789460931130.
