= Kwa languages =

Proposed language family in Ivory Coast, Ghana, and Togo

Kwa
- New Kwa
- (proposed)
- Geographic distribution: Ivory Coast, Ghana, and Togo
- Linguistic classification: Niger–Congo?: Atlantic–Congo; Volta–Congo; Kwa
- Subdivisions: Potou–Tano; Ga–Dangme; Na-Togo (reduced); Anii–Adele; Ka-Togo (reduced); Kebu–Animere; Avikam–Alladian; Attié; Abé; Adjukru; Abidji; ? Apro

Language codes
- Glottolog: kwav1236
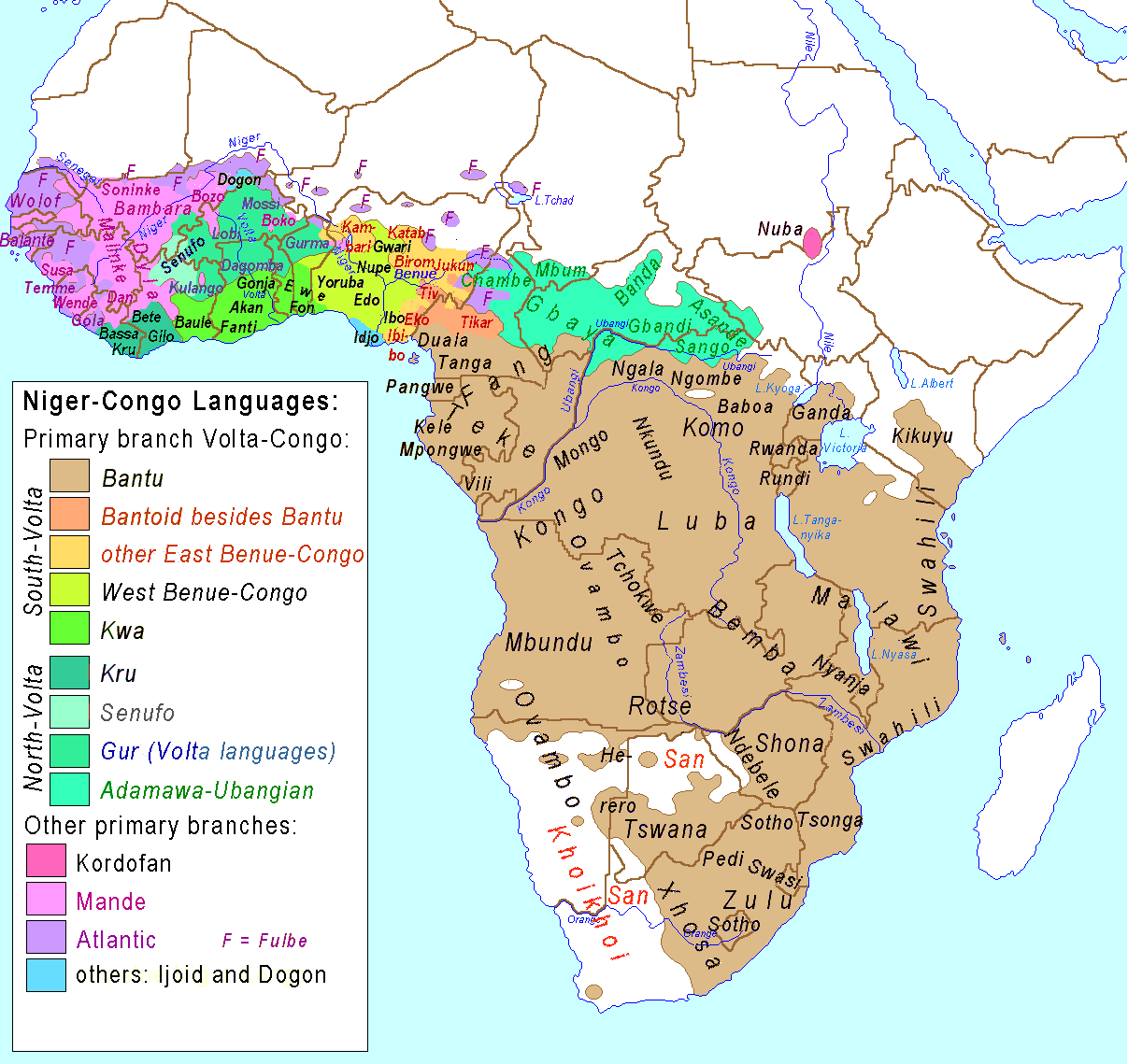
- Map showing the distribution of Niger–Congo languages. Light green is the Kwa subfamily.

The Kwa languages, often specified as New Kwa, are a proposed but as-yet-undemonstrated family of languages spoken in the south-eastern part of Ivory Coast, across southern Ghana, and in central Togo. The Kwa family belongs to the Niger-Congo phylum. The name was introduced in 1895 by Gottlob Krause and derives from the word for 'people' (Kwa) in many of these languages, as illustrated by Akan names. This branch consists of around 50 different languages spoken by about 25 million people. Some of the largest Kwa languages are Twi-Fante and Baule.

== Languages ==
See the box at right for a current classification.

The various clusters of languages included in Kwa are at best distantly related, and it has not been demonstrated that they are closer to each other than to neighbouring Niger–Congo languages.

Stewart distinguished the following major branches, which historical-comparative analysis supports as valid groups:

- Potou–Tano (including Akan)
- Ga–Dangme
- Na-Togo
- [formerly] Gbe (inclusion doubtful, as they show more features of Kwa the closer one moves to Akan)

The Lagoon languages of southern Ivory Coast are not particularly close to any of these, nor to each other, so they are left ungrouped:

- Avikam–Alladian
- Attié
- Abé
- Adjukru
- Abidji
- Ega

An Esuma language, extinct ca. 1800, remains unclassified.

Since Stewart, Ega has been tentatively removed, the Gbe languages reassigned to Volta–Niger, and Apro added. Some of the Na-Togo and Ka-Togo languages have been placed into separate branches of Kwa:

- Potou–Tano
- Ga–Dangme
- Na-Togo (reduced)
- Anii–Adele
- Ka-Togo (reduced)
- Kebu–Animere
- Avikam–Alladian
- Attié
- Abé
- Adjukru
- Abidji
- ? Apro

Ethnologue divides the Kwa languages into two broad geographical groupings: Nyo and Left bank, but this is a geographic rather than a genealogical classification. The Nyo group collapses Stewart's Potou–Tano and Ga–Dangme branches and also includes the ungrouped languages of southern Ivory Coast, while the Ka/Na-Togo and Gbe languages are called Left bank because they are spoken to the east of the Volta River.

== History of the proposal ==
The word 'Kwa' was used by Gottlob Krause in 1885 for the Akan (or perhaps Tano), Gã, and Gbe languages, which have kwa or kua as their word for 'human being'. Since then the proposal has been dramatically expanded, only to revert to something approaching its initial conception.

In 1952 Westermann and Bryan expanded Kwa to the various Lagoon languages of southern Ivory Coast and to what are now called the Volta–Niger languages of southern Nigeria. Greenberg (1963) added the Kru languages of Liberia, the Ghana–Togo Mountain languages which Westermann and Bryan had specifically excluded, and Ijaw of the Niger delta; West Kwa included the languages from Liberia to Dahomey (Republic of Benin), and East Kwa the languages of Nigeria. Bennett & Sterk (1977) proposed that the Yoruboid and Igboid languages belonged in Benue–Congo rather than in Kwa. Stewart (1989) removed Kru, Ijaw, and Volta–Niger (East Kwa), but kept the Ghana–Togo Mountain and Lagoon languages, as well as adding a few obscure, newly described languages. Stewart's classification is the basis of more recent conceptions. To disambiguate this from Greenberg's influential classification, the reduced family is sometimes called "New Kwa".

== Comparative vocabulary ==
Sample basic vocabulary of Kwa and related languages from Dumestre (1971) and other sources:

Classification	Language	eye	ear	tooth	tongue	mouth	blood	bone	tree	water
Ghana-Togo	Proto-Central Togo	*ki-nu-bí /bi-	*ku-túe /a-	*li-nía /a-; *li-lúma /a-	*ki-níé-bí /bi-	*ka-niána /ku-; *o- núí /i-		*li-kúpá /a-	*ku-wyéu /a-	*n-tû
Ga–Dangme	Ga	hiŋmɛi	toi¹	nyanyɔŋ	lilɛi²	daa⁴	la⁵	wu⁴	tso³	nu⁵
Ga–Dangme	Ga	hi-ŋmɛi	toí	ɲaɲɔɔ	líʔlɛ́í	dáʔá	lá	wú	tʃo	nu
Ga–Dangme	Dangme	hí-ŋmɛ́	túê	lúŋù	lílɛ́	ɲâà	mùɔ̀	wû	tʃô	ɲù
Potou-Tano	Proto-Potou–Tano	*-ɲĩ	*-tʊ̃			*-nʊ̃				*-ju
Potou-Tano	Proto-Akanic	*-ɲĩ	*-sʊ̃			*-nʊ̃				*-cu
Potou-Tano	Twi-Fante	ɜ-nĩ	a-sʊ̃			a-nʊ̃				n-su
Potou-Tano	Proto-Guang		*kω-sω			*kɔ-nɔ̃	*ŋ-kalωŋ		*o-yi	*ɲ-ču
Potou-Tano	Baoulé	ɲima	su	ɟe	taama, tãflã	nwã	moɟa	oɥje	wake	n̥zɥe
Potou-Tano	Ebrié	m̥mɛ-ɓi	n̥ɟɛ	n̥nɔ	allɛ	m̥mɛ	n̥ka	n̥eʔwe	aja	n̥du
Potou-Tano	Krobou	ɲɛ-bi	su	n̥ɲɛ	dandre	n̥nɔ̃	n̥krã	m̥rɔ	ɲamɛ	n̥zɔ
Potou-Tano	Aboure	ɛɲɛ	ɔwɔ	n̥ɲɛ	nãnɛ	ɔblɔ	n̥nla	eboɛ̃	elibe	n̥tʃwɛ
Potou-Tano	Eotile	ɛjima	ɔho	anna	annɛ	ãto	n̥na	n̥tɔwu	edwɔ	n̥su
Potou-Tano	Mbatto	õɲɛ̃muo	õdʒo	ɔ̃nɔ̃gõ	olɛ	ẽmẽ	õglɔ̃	õtʃɥi	ojoku	õdu
Lagoon	Adioukrou	ɲama	lɔru	nɛn	anm	nɛɲ	mebl	luw	l-ikŋ	midʒ
Lagoon	Abbey	aɛ̃mɔ̃	rɔkɔ	eji	lɛtɛ	ejimbu	m̥pje	sfje	ti	midʒi
Lagoon	Attie	himbɛ	te	hɛ̃	nũ	mɛ	vø̃	fe	dzakwɛ	sø
Lagoon	Alladian	ɛrɛ	nuku	n̥ɲi	ɛwɛ̃	ɛmwã	n̥krɛ	n̥wi	ɛtɛ	n̥ʃi
Lagoon	Avikam	eŋwaɓa	ɛzjɛɓa	ɛɲrã	azraɓa	enɔ̃	ɛvɛ̃	ɛwu	eziba	ɛsɔ̃
Lagoon	Abidji	nɔnɔwɛ	rɛte	ɛɲi	ine	nimiti	m̥bwo	luvu	tʰi	mindi
Kru	Aizi	zro	lokɔ	ɲɪ	mrɔ	mu	ɲre	kra	ke	nrɪ̃
Ega	Ega	efí /e	elowá /a-	ɛnʊmà /a-	eno /i-	ɔ̀mà	àsɔ̀	ìkù	ote /a-	aɗú
Pere	Pere	jísì-kéé	nɛ́ɛ́(ⁿ)	ɲòŋòmù	jèŋgé	yúgú	ɲààmú	kóó	gbèè-tííⁿ	túmú
Mpra	Mpra	anisi		ate	nchuma	nchumu			eyia	nkaw; nkwõ
Dompo	Dompo	nyisi	sepe	nyì	dandulo	kanu	nkla	wuu	yi	nsu
Gbe	Proto-Gbe		*-tó	*aɖú	*-ɖɛ́	*-ɖũ; *-ɖũkpá	*-ʁʷũ	*-χʷú	*-tĩ́	*-tsĩ

=== Numerals ===
Comparison of numerals in individual languages:

Classification	Language	1	2	3	4	5	6	7	8	9	10
Left Bank, Avatime-Nyangbo	Avatime	ólè	ɔ́βà	ɔ́tà	óné	ót͡ʃù	óɡlò	ɡlóelè	ɡɔ́tɔ́βà	ɡɔ́tólé	líɔfɔ
Left Bank, Avatime-Nyangbo	Nyangbo (1)	olí	ɛbʰa	ɛtá	ɛlɛ́	ití	holo	ɡene	ansɛ	ʒita	kɛfɔ
Left Bank, Avatime-Nyangbo	Nyangbo (2)	olié	ɛbʰa	ɛtaé	ɛlɛ	etié	holō	ɡěneé	ansɛ	ʒitaé	kɛfɔ
Left Bank, Avatime-Nyangbo	Tafi (1)	olí	ɛbʰa	ɛtá	ẽlɛ	ití	holō	ɡéné	asuɛ̄	ʒitá	kɛfɔ̄
Left Bank, Avatime-Nyangbo	Tafi (2)	olí	ɪbʰa	ɪtá	ĩlĩ́	ití	holō	ɡéné	asʊī	ʒitá	kífɔ̄
Left Bank, Gbe	Éwé	èɖé	èvè	ètɔ̃	ènè	àtɔ̃	àdẽ́	adrẽ́	èɲí	aʃíeké	èwó
Left Bank, Gbe	Kotafon-Gbe	ɖok͡po	àwè	àtɔ̃̂	ènɛ̀	àtɔ̃́	aɲizɛ̃	tsĩ́ã̀wè (litː hand+ 2)	tsĩ́ã̀tɔ̃̂ (litː hand+ 3)	tsĩ́ɛ̀nɛ̀ (litː hand+ 4)	emewó
Left Bank, Gbe	Saxwe-Gbe	ɑ̀ɖé / ɖók͡pó	òwê	ɑ̀tɔ̃̂	ɛ̀nɛ̃̂	ɑ̀tṹ	ɑ̀dɛ̃́	ɑ̀tʃówê (5 + 2)	ɑ̀tɾótɔ̃̂ (5 + 3)	ɑ̀tʃɛ̃́nɛ̃̂ (5 + 5)	òwō
Left Bank, Gbe	Waci-Gbe (Gen-Gbe)	ɖeka	(e)ve	(e)tɔn	(e)ne	(a)tɔ́n	(a)dén	(á)dlén	(e)nyí	(e)asiɖeka (10 -1) ?	(e)wo
Left Bank, Gbe	Western Xwla-Gbe	lók͡pó	ɔ̀wè	ɔ̀tɔ̃̀	ɛ̀nɛ̀	àtɔ̃́	àtroók͡pó (5 + 1)	àcówè	àtsítɔ̃̀	àtsíɛ̀	ɔ̀síɔsí (litː hand hand)
Left Bank, Gbe	Xwla-Gbe	òɖě(lók͡pō)	ōwè	ōtɔ̃̀	ēnɛ̀	àtɔ̃̄ɔ̃̄	ātrók͡pō	ācíòwè	àtĩ́tɔ̃̀	àcíɛ̀nɛ̀	ōwóé
Left Bank, Gbe, Aja	Aja-Gbe (Aja)	eɖé / ɖeka	èvè / amɛ̃ve	etɔ̃̂ / amɛ̃tɔ̃	enɛ̀ / amɛ̃nɛ̃	atɔ̃ / amãtɔ̃	adɛ̃ / amãdɛ̃	adɾɛ / amãdɾɛ	eɲĩ / amɛ̃ɲĩ	ɲíɖe / aʃiɖekɛ / amãʃíɖekɛ (10 -1)	ewó
Left Bank, Gbe, Aja	Gun-Gbe	òɖè / ɖòk͡pó	àwe	àtɔn	ɛnɛ̀n	àtɔ́n	t͡ʃíɖòk͡pó (?+1)	t͡ʃiánwè (?+2)	t͡ʃíantɔ̀n (?+3)	t͡ʃíɛ́nnɛ̀n (?+4)	àwò
Left Bank, Gbe, Fon	Fon-Gbe (Fon)	ɖě	we	atɔn	ɛnɛ	atɔ́ɔ́n	ayizɛ́n	tɛ́nwe (5 + 2)	tántɔn (5 + 3)	tɛ́nnɛ (5 + 5)	wǒ
Left Bank, Gbe, Fon	Maxi-Gbe	ɖèé	òwè	ɔ̀tɔ̃̀	ɛ̀nɛ̀	àtɔ̃́	ayizɛ̃	tɛ́ɛwè (5 + 2)	tã́tɔ̃̀ (5 + 3)	tɛ̃ɛ̃nɛ̀ (5 + 5)	òwó
Left Bank, Gbe, Mina	Gen-Gbe (Gen)	èɖě	èvè	ētɔ̃̀	ēnɛ̀	àtɔ̃́ɔ̃	ādɛ̃́	ǎdrɛ̃́	ēɲí	ēɲíɖé (10 -1)	ēwó
Left Bank, Kebu-Animere	Akebu (1)	ʈɛ́ì	jí	tā	nìə̀ə̀	tʊ̄ʊ̀	kʊ̀rã̀ŋ	pīrìmātā	nɛ̀ĩ̀ŋ	fã̀ŋt͡ʃẽ̄ŋt͡ʃẽ̄ŋ	tə̀
Left Bank, Kebu-Animere	Akebu (2)	dɛi	yi	taː	niə	tuw	turaŋ	primata	nɛŋ	fant͡ʃet͡ʃeŋ (10 - 1) ?	tə
Left Bank, Kebu-Animere	Animere	bɛɹi	din	tʰa	aɳe	atʰuŋ	akʰuɹuŋ	ɳotʰa	ɳoɳa	fʊɳe	tʰi
Left Bank, Kposo-Ahlo-Bowili	Igo (Ahlon)	ili	ìwà	ìtã	àlã̀	ùtɔ	uɡo	ùzòni	ùmàlà	úkàli	ɔ̀wú
Left Bank, Kposo-Ahlo-Bowili	Ikposo-uwi	ɛ̀dɪ	ɛ̀fʷà	ɛ̀la	ɛ̀na	ɛ̀tʊ	ɛ̀wlʊ	ɛ̀wlʊdɪ (6 + 1) ?	ɛ̀lɛ	ɛ̀lɛdɪ (8 + 1) ?	ìd͡ʒo
Left Bank, Kposo-Ahlo-Bowili	Tuwuri (Bowiri)	kédì	kɛ́ɛ́yá	kààlɛ̀	kɛ́ɛ́ná	kùùló	kévũ̀	kɛ́kɔ̀nɔ̀	kɛ̀ɛ̀lɛ̃̀	kàvèdí (10 - 1) ?	kùwà
Nyo, Agneby	Abé (Abbey)	ŋ̀k͡pɔ̄	āɲʊ̃́	āɾí	àlɛ́	ōní	lɔ̀hɔ̃̀	lɔ̀hʍ̃ã̄ɾí	èpʲè	ɲāàkó	ǹnɛ̀
Nyo, Agneby	Abidji	ń̩nɔ̀	áānʊ̄	ɛ̃́ɛ̃̄tɪ̄	ã́ã̄lā	éēnē	náhʊ̃̀ã̀	nɔ̃́ᵐbʊ̀	nówò	nɛ̃́ᵐbrɛ̀	ń̩díɔ̀
Nyo, Agneby	Adioukrou	ɲâm	ɲóɲ	ɲâhǹ	jâr	jên	nɔ̂hǹ	lɔ́bŋ̀	níwǹ	líbárm̀	lɛ̂w
Nyo, Attie	Attié	èk	kɛ́mwʌ̃́	kɛ́hã́	kɛ́dʒí	kɛ̋bʌ̃́	kɛ̋mũ̄	n̩ső	mɔ̃̀kɥɛ́	ŋ̩ɡʷã	kɛ̃̋ŋ
Nyo, Attie	Ga	ékòmé	éɲɔ̀	étɛ̃	éɟwɛ̀	énùmɔ̃	ék͡pàa	k͡pàwo (6 + 1) ?	k͡pàaɲɔ̃ (6 + 2) ?	nɛ̀ɛhṹ	ɲɔ̀ŋmá
Nyo, Ga-Dangme	Dangme	kákē	éɲɔ̃̀	étɛ̃̄	éywɛ̀ / éwìɛ̀	énũ̄ɔ̃̄	ék͡pà	k͡pààɡō (6 + 1) ?	k͡pàaɲɔ̃̄ (6 + 2) ?	nɛ̃̀ɛ̃́	ɲɔ̃̀ŋ͡mã́ (plural formː ɲĩ̀ŋ͡mĩ́)
Nyo, Potou-Tano, Basila-Adele	Adele	ɛ̀kí	ɛ̀nyɔ̀ɔ̀n	àsì	ɛ̀nàà	tòn	kòòròn	kɔ̀rɔ̀nkí (6 + 1) ?	nìyɛ̀	yɛ̀kí (10 - 1) ?	fò
Nyo, Potou-Tano, Basila-Adele	Anii	dɨ̄ŋ, ɡādɨ̄ŋ, ɡīdɨ̄ŋ, ɡūdɨ̄ŋ	īɲīʊ̄, bʊ̄ɲīʊ̄, bāɲīʊ̄,	īrīū, īrīū, īrīū	īnāŋ, īnāŋ, īnāŋ	īnʊ̄ŋ, īnʊ̄ŋ, īnʊ̄ŋ	īkōlōŋ, īkōlōŋ, īkōlōŋ	kūlūmī	ɡánááná	tʃīīnī	tɘ̄b
Nyo, Potou-Tano, Lelemi, Lelemi-Akpafu	Lelemi	ùnwì	íɲɔ́	ɛ̀tɛ̀	ínɛ́	ɛ̀lɔ́	ɛ̀kú	máátɛ̀ (4 + 3) ?	máánɛ́ (4 + 4) ?	lɛ́yàlìnwì (10 - 1) ?	lèèvù
Nyo, Potou-Tano, Lelemi, Lelemi-Akpafu	Siwu (Akpafu)	ɔ̀wɛ̃̂	íɲɔ̂	ìtɛ́	ínâ	írù	íkùɔ̀	ìkɔ́dzɛ̂ (4 + 3) ?	fàráfánà (4 + 4) ?	káiwɛ̃̂ (10 - 1) ?	ìwéó
Nyo, Potou-Tano, Lelemi, Likpe-Santrokofi	Sekpele (1)	nʊ̀ɛ́ (lɛ̀wɛ́)	núə̀	ǹtsyə́	ńnà	ǹnɔ́	ǹkùá	kùánsè	yèní	nàsé	lèfòsì
Nyo, Potou-Tano, Lelemi, Likpe-Santrokofi	Sekpele (2)	nùɛ́	núə̀	ǹtsyə́	ǹná	ǹnɔ́	ǹkúa	kúansè	yèní	nàsé	lèfósì
Nyo, Potou-Tano, Lelemi, Likpe-Santrokofi	Selee (Santrokofi)	ònwíì	ɔ̀ɲɔ́	òtìɛ́	ɔ́nà	ɔ̀nɔ́ɔ̀	òkúɔ́	kùɛ́nsĩ́	ɔ̀nɛ́	nàásĩ́	lèfósì
Nyo, Potou-Tano, Logba	Logba (1)	ik͡pɛ	inyɔ	ita	ina	inú	iɡló	ɡlaŋk͡pe	mlaminá	ɡɔkwaɖu	uɖú
Nyo, Potou-Tano, Logba	Logba (2)	ik͡pɛ	iɲɔ	ita	ina	inú	iɡló	ɡlaŋk͡pe	mlaminá	ɡɔkwaɖu	uɖú
Nyo, Potou-Tano, Tano, Central, Akan	Bono Twi	baakó̃	mienu	miensá	nain	num	nsiã	nsɔ	ŋɔt͡ʃwie	ŋkrɔŋ	du
Nyo, Potou-Tano, Tano, Central, Akan	Akuapem Twi (1)	baakó~	ə̀bìéń	ə̀bìèsá~	ànáń	ə̀núḿ	ə̀sìá~	ə̀sɔ́ń	àwòtɕɥé /tw/	àkróń	dú
Nyo, Potou-Tano, Tano, Central, Akan	Twi-Fante (2)	baakó̃	mmienú	mmeɛnsã́	(ɛ)náń	(e)núḿ	(e)nsĩã́	(ɛ)nsóń	nwɔtwé	(ɛ)nkróń	(e)dú
Nyo, Potou-Tano, Tano, Central, Bia, Northern	Anufo	kũ	ɲ̀ɲɔ̀	ǹzã̀	ǹná	ǹnú	ǹʒɛ̃́	ǹzô	mɔ̀cᵘɛ́	ŋ̀ɡɔ̀ná	búɾú
Nyo, Potou-Tano, Tano, Central, Bia, Northern	Anyin	ɛ̀kʊ̃ (in counting)/ kʊ̃ (after a noun)	ɲɲṹã	nsɑ̃	nnɑ̃́	nnṹ	nsĩ́ã́	nsʊ̂	mɔcuɛ́	ŋɡʊ̃ɑ̃lɑ̃́	búlú
Nyo, Potou-Tano, Tano, Central, Bia, Northern	Baule (Baoulé)	kùn	ǹɲɔ̀n	ǹsàn	ǹnán	ǹnún	ǹsiɛ́n	ǹsô	ǹmɔ̀cuɛ́	ǹɡwlàn	blú
Nyo, Potou-Tano, Tano, Central, Bia, Northern	Sehwi	kʊ̃̀	ɲɔ̀	ǹzã̀	ǹná	ǹnú	ǹziã́	ǹzɔ́ː	mɔ̀tʃwɛ́	ǹɡɔ̃̀lã̀	bʊ́lʊ́
Nyo, Potou-Tano, Tano, Central, Bia, Southern	Ahanta	ɔ̀kʊ́n	àɥɪ̀n	àsàn	ànlà	ə̀nlù	ə̀ʃiə̀	ə̀súŋwà	àwɔ̀twɛ̀	àhɔ́nlà	bùnlù
Nyo, Potou-Tano, Tano, Central, Bia, Southern	Nzema	ɛ̀kʊ̃ (in counting)/ kʊ̃ (after a noun)	ɲ́ɲʊ̃ (tone reversals after nouns)	ńsɑ̃	ńnɑ̃	ńnṹ	ńsĩ́ã	ńsṹũ	mɔ́cʊɛ	ŋɡʊ̃lɑ̃́	bulú
Nyo, Potou-Tano, Tano, Central, Bia, Southern	Jwira-Pepesa	ko	ńwia	ńsa	ńna	ńnu	ńsiã	ńsuw	mɔ́twɛ	nɡhoalá	eburú
Nyo, Potou-Tano, Tano, Guang, North Guang	Chumburung	kɔ́	ɪ̀ɲɔ́	ɪ̀sá	ɪ̀ná	ɪ̀núː	ìsíyé	ìsúnóː	ìbùrùwá	ɪ̀kpánɔ́ː	kúdú
Nyo, Potou-Tano, Tano, Guang, North Guang	Dwang (Bekye)	kɔ́ɔ́	aɲó	asá	aná	anú	asíé	asʊ́nɔ	at͡ʃwé	ak͡pɔ́nɔ	ídú
Nyo, Potou-Tano, Tano, Guang, North Guang	Foodo	ǹkɔ́ /ɔkʊlam	ǹɲʸɔ́	ǹsá	ǹnáàŋ	ǹnṹũ̀ / ǹnúŋ	ǹséè	ǹsínō	dùkwéè / dùkoi	ǹk͡pánɔ̀	dúdu
Nyo, Potou-Tano, Tano, Guang, North Guang	Ginyanga	okou	iɡno	issa	ina	inoun	issi	sono	ɡuikoe	sonʔou	ɡuidou
Nyo, Potou-Tano, Tano, Guang, North Guang	Gonja	à-kô	à-ɲɔ́	à-sá	à-ná	à-nú	à-ʃé	à-ʃúnù	à-bùrùwá	à-k͡pánà	kùdú
Nyo, Potou-Tano, Tano, Guang, North Guang	Kplang (Prang)	kɔ̃ / ɛkʊ́nkɔ́	áɲɔ	asa	aná	ɛnʊ́	esé	ɛsʊ́nʊ́	ɛkwé	apʊ́nɔ́	ídú
Nyo, Potou-Tano, Tano, Guang, North Guang	Krache (Kaakyi)	kɔ́ɔ́	aɲɔ́	asá	aná	ɛnʊ̂	ɛsíɛ́	asʊ́nɔ́	kukwé	ak͡pʊ́nɔ́	kúdú
Nyo, Potou-Tano, Tano, Guang, North Guang	Nawuri	kʊ́ːʔ	aɲɔ́	asá	aná	anû	asíjé	asúnɔ̂	abᵘɾuwá	akpʌ́nɔ̂	ɡúdú
Nyo, Potou-Tano, Tano, Guang, North Guang	Nkonya	ɛ̀-kʊ̃̀ (ɔ̀-kʊ̀ Northern Dialect) / ɪ̀-kʊ̀lɛ̀	à-ɲɔ̀	à-sà	à-nà	à-nù	à-sìè	à-sìènɔ́	ɪ̀-kʷè	ɪ̀-kʷèbá	ɪ̀-dú
Nyo, Potou-Tano, Tano, Guang, South Guang	Awutu (Awutu-Efutu)	kòmé	ìɲɔ́	èsã́	ènaː́ ̀	ènú	ìsɛ̃́ː ̀	ìsɔ̃́	itʃwé	ɛ̀pán	ìdù
Nyo, Potou-Tano, Tano, Guang, South Guang	Cherepon	àkʊ́	ìɲɔ́	ìsã́	ìnɛ̂	ìnî	ìsíɛ̃̀	ìsúnɔ̋	ìtwî	ìk͡púnɔ̋	ìdû
Nyo, Potou-Tano, Tano, Guang, South Guang	Gua	ákò	nyɔ́	sã́	nɛ̃̀	nĩ́	sĩ̀ɛ̀	sùnɔ̃́	twí	k͡plɔ̃́	ìdú
Nyo, Potou-Tano, Tano, Guang, South Guang	Larteh (1)	kɔ́	ɲyɔ́	sá	nɛ́	nú	síɛ̀	súnɔ́	tɕɥí	k͡pʋ́nɔ́	dú
Nyo, Potou-Tano, Tano, Guang, South Guang	Larteh (2)	kõ	ɲɔ̃	sã	nɛ̃	nũ	sĩɛ̃	sũnɔ̃	cui	k͡plɔ̃	du
Nyo, Potou-Tano, Tano, Western	Abouré (Abure)	okuè	aɲù	nɳà	nnàn	nnú	ncɪɛ̀	ncʋ̀n	mɔ̀kʋ̀ɛ́	puálɛ́hʋ̀n	óblún

== Proto Language ==
=== Phonology ===
==== Consonants ====
		Labial	Coronal	Palatalized	Palatal	Velar	Labiovelar
Nasal		*m	*n				
Plosive	Voicless	*p	*t	*tⁱ	*c		*kʷ
Plosive	Voiced	*b				*g	*gʷ
Implosive	Voicless					*ƙ	
Implosive	Voiced	*ɓ	*ɗ				*ɠʷ
Fricative		*ɸ	*s				
Aproximant			*l̃			*ɰ	

*ɗ only occurs before oral vowels while l̃ only occurs before nasal vowels

*c is an affricate

==== Vowels ====
Proto Kwa had the vowels a, i, ɩ, u, ʊ, ã, ĩ, ɩ̃, ũ, ʊ̃.

Cross high vowel harmony may have existed.

== See also ==
- Proto-Potou-Akanic reconstructions (Wiktionary)
- Gbe languages
- Kru languages
- Gur languages
