= Avatime language =

Kwa language of Ghana

Avatime
- Sia (Siyase)
- Sì-yà
- Native to: Ghana
- Region: Volta Region
- Ethnicity: Avatime
- Native speakers: 27,200 (2013)
- Language family: Niger–Congo?: Atlantic–Congo; Kwa; Ka-Togo; Avatime–Nyangbo; Avatime

Language codes
- ISO 639-3: avn
- Glottolog: avat1244

Avatime
- People: Ke-dane-ma
- Language: Sì-yà

Avatime, also known as Afatime, Sideme, or Sia, is a Kwa language of the Avatime (self designation: Kedone (m.sg.)) people of eastern Ghana. The Avatime live primarily in the seven towns and villages of Amedzofe, Vane, Gbadzeme, Dzokpe, Biakpa, Dzogbefeme, and Fume.

== Phonology ==
Avatime is a tonal language with three tones, has vowel harmony, and has been claimed to have doubly articulated fricatives.

=== Vowels ===
Avatime has nine vowels, /i ɪ e ɛ a ɔ o ʊ u/, though the vowels /ɪ ʊ/ have been overlooked in most descriptions of the language. It is not clear if the difference between /i e o u/ and /ɪ ɛ ɔ ʊ/ is one of advanced and retracted tongue root (laryngeal contraction), as in so many languages of Ghana, or of vowel height: different phonetic parameters support different analyses. (Note: Since the IPA does not have distinct letters for ±ATR vowels, they are transcribed here as differing in height for legibility.)

Avatime has vowel harmony. A root many not mix vowels of the relaxed /i e o u/ and contracted /ɪ ɛ a ɔ ʊ/ sets, and prefixes change vowels to harmonize with the vowels of the root. For example, the human singular gender prefix is /ɔ ~ o/, and the human plural is /a ~ e/: /o-ze/ "thief", /ɔ-ka/ "father"; /be-ze/ "thieves", /ba-ka/ "fathers"; also /o-bu/ "bee" but /ɔ-bʊ/ "god". (Note: Tone not marked. Other prefixes vary as /ɛ ~ e/)

Vowels may be long or short. Records from 1910 showed that all vowels could be nasalized, but that is disappearing, and few words with nasal vowels remained by the end of the century.

=== Consonants ===
Avatime consonants
		Bilabial	Labio- dental	Alveolar	Post- alveolar	Velar	Labio- velar
Nasal		m		n	ɲ	ŋ	ŋʷ
Plosive	Voiceless	p		t		k	k͡p
Plosive	Voiced	b		d		ɡ	ɡ͡b
Affricate	Voiceless			t͡s ~ t͡ʃ			
Affricate	Voiced			d͡z ~ d͡ʒ			
Fricative	Voiceless		f	s		x	xʷ
Fricative	Voiced	β	v	z		ɣ	ɣʷ
Approximant				l ~ r	j		w

/ɸ/ is found in Ewe borrowings, as is /kʷ/, which can be seen to be distinct from /kw/ (which cannot be followed by another consonant) in the loanword /àkʷlɛ̄/ 'boat'.

The language has been claimed to have doubly articulated fricatives /x͡ɸ ɣ͡β/. However, as with similar claims for Swedish [ɧ], the labial articulation is not fricated, and these are actually labialized velars, /xʷ ɣʷ/. All velar fricatives are quite weak, and are more often [h ɦ hʷ ɦʷ].

The affricates vary between [t͡s], [d͡z] and [t͡ʃ], [d͡ʒ], which may be a generational difference.

=== Phonotactics ===
Syllables are V, CV, CGV, and N: Avatime allows consonant-approximant clusters, where the approximant may be /l/, /w/, /j/. There is also a syllabic nasal, which takes its own tone: /kpāŋ̄/ "many".

Any consonant but /n/, /l/ may form a cluster with /l/: /ɔ̀kplɔ̄nɔ̀/ "table", /ɔ̀ɡblāɡɛ̄/ "snake", /káɣʷlɪ̀tsã̀/ "chameleon", /sɪ̄ŋʷlɛ̀sɛ̃̀/ "mucous". After a coronal consonant, the /l/ is pronounced [r].

When two vowels come together, they are either separated by a glottal stop [ʔ], fuse into a single vowel, or the first vowel reduces to a semivowel. In the latter case, the four front vowels reduce to [j] and three of the back vowels reduce to [w], but /u/ is fronted to [ɥ].

However, there are /Cw/ and /Cj/ sequences which are not derived from vowel sequences. These are /fw/, /mw/, /fj/, /vj/, /βj/, /tj/, /dj/, /sj/, /zj/, /lj/, /ŋʷj/.
