= Benjamin Asante =

Ghanaian engineer

Benjamin Asante PhD PEng

CEO of Ghana Gas
- President: Nana Akuffo-Addo
- Preceded by: George Yankey

Personal details
- Born: Ghana
- Education: Mfantsipim School, KNUST, University of Calgary, Imperial College London
- Occupation: Chemical/Petroleum Engineer
- Profession: Oil and gas consultant

Benjamin K. D. Asante is a Ghanaian engineer and international consultant for the gas and oil industry. He is a graduate of Mfantsipim School and Kwame Nkrumah University of Science and Technology. He is the chief executive officer of the Ghana National Gas Company.

== Early life and education ==
Benjamin Asante is an Asante-Akyem from Juansa and was born in Kumasi in the Ashanti Region of Ghana to Kwasi Aninakwa-Asante and Gladys Mensah. He attended the Bantama/Asokwa Presby primary schools, and State Experimental and City of Kumasi middle schools. Upon passing his common entrance exam, he was admitted into Mfantsipim School in Cape Coast, where he obtained his GCE Ordinary Level and GCE Advanced Level certificates in science. He proceeded to Kwame Nkrumah University of Science and Technology, Kumasi, and graduated with a Bachelor of Science in chemical engineering. He later enrolled at the University of Calgary, Canada, where he pursued a Master's degree in chemical engineering. He also completed a joint dissertation on Multiphase (Oil and Gas) Flow at Imperial College London and the University of Calgary and obtained a PhD in chemical engineering.

== Career ==
Upon graduating from university in 1984, Asante was posted to the National Industrial Company in Kumasi for his national service. He has worked for major operating companies as well as engineering consulting companies in Canada, the US, and Ghana in various technical and management roles. He has also provided engineering services, project management, and technical support for projects throughout the world, including Abu Dhabi, Argentina, Australia, Bangladesh, Bolivia, Brazil, Canada, Chile, China, Colombia, Ghana, Indonesia, Malaysia, Mexico, Pakistan, Papua New Guinea, Peru, Russia, South Korea, Thailand, Vietnam, and the US. He has also provided consulting services to the World Bank and Asian Development Bank.

Asante has taught gas processing and pipeline engineering to graduate students at Kwame Nkrumah University of Science and Technology and Imperial College, London. His expertise was brought to the fore after 2007 when Ghana discovered oil in commercial quantities. He was the technical director of Ghana's first gas infrastructure project and also developed the first gas infrastructure and utilization master plan for Ghana in 2008. His work profile includes periods at Nova-TransCanada, Jacobs Engineering, and Enron. Whilst at Enron, he was adjudged the Best Employee for exhibiting respect, innovation, and excellence in 2001.

Asante was one of only five Africans to be invited by the United States Department of Energy to help author a book on natural gas and liquefied natural gas. He was an expert witness in the resolution of the gas custody dispute between Bolivia and Brazil in 2004. He has advised on, developed, and evaluated several oil and gas projects around the world.

=== Ghana Gas appointment ===
In January 2017, President Nana Akufo-Addo appointed him as acting CEO of Ghana Gas. Asante replaced George Yankey, who had asked for a terminal leave from the Board of Ghana Gas. Upon his appointment, some groups in the Nzema area, where the operations of Ghana Gas are situated, questioned the president's decision to appoint Asante. According to one of the groups, they were of the view that Asante had superintended many controversial deals whilst he was consulting for the Ghana National Petroleum Corporation. They asked that more information be released on all deals that Asante may have been involved in so they could assess for themselves if he had played any negative role in them. Based on these allegations, other groups rose in support of the president's appointee. They believed that the groups opposing the president's appointee had preferred the appointment to have gone to one Kaku Sagary Nokoe, a native of the Nzema area. In February 2017, Awulae Agyevi Kwame II, Paramount chief of Nsein, who had been leading calls for the president to cancel the appointment of Asante, pledged to work with him, conceding defeat in his bid to get a native of the land to be appointed to the position.

Political offices
Preceded by George Yankey	Head of Ghana Gas; Ghana; 2017 -	Incumbent
