= Asasetre =

- Town
- Location of Asasetre in Western Region, South Ghana
- Coordinates: 5°1′4″N 1°52′26″W
- Country: Ghana
- Region: Western Region
- District: Ellembelle District
- Elevation: 71 m (233 ft)
- Time zone: GMT
  - Summer (DST): GMT

Asasetre a Town in the Ellembelle District in the Western Region of Ghana, located near Nkroful.

== Geography ==
Asasetre is located 7 km Southeast of Nkroful located near Axim in the Nzema East Municipality.
