= Adubrim =

- Village
- Location of Adubrim in Western Region, South Ghana
- Coordinates: 5°4′0″N 2°24′0″W
- Country: Ghana
- Region: Western Region
- District: Ellembelle District
- Elevation: 70 m (230 ft)
- Time zone: GMT
  - Summer (DST): GMT

Adubrim is a village in the Ellembelle District, a district in the Western Region of south Ghana, located near Axim in the Nzema East Municipal of the Western Region.

== Economy ==
The economy is mainly based on Cocoa farming, but the area also has coconut and rubber plantations.

Adubrim has a basic school and a clinic that serves over five surrounding communities in the area.

== Geography ==
=== Location ===
Adubrim is located at an elevation of 70 meters above sea level with a population of about 8,790.
