= Ejan =

Ejan may refer to:

== Places ==
- Ayjan, Markazi Province, Iran
- Ejan, Ghana

== People ==
- Ejan Mackaay (born 1943), Canadian legal scholar
