= Ainyinase =

Town in western Ghana

Aiyinase (Nzema Aiyinase) is a town in the Ellembele District in the Western Region of Ghana. It lies 90 kilometers of Sekondi – Takoradi, the port and capital city of Western Region. In 2015, the community had a population of 10,719.

== Economy ==
Aiyinase is an area well known for their coconut, cassava and rubber plantations. Basically, the main occupation of the people in the locality are farmers.

== Culture and history ==
Aiyinase (Enyenra bo) literally means "Under the Silk Tree" in Nzema language. The people in Aiyinase are believed to have migrated from the southern part of Ghana. The people celebrate Kundum Festival which is carried out in the month of October each year. The festival is used as a medium to thank their ancestors for the abundance of food at the time of harvest.

== Sports ==
Aiyinase is the home base of the Ghanaian professional club Karela United FC, which qualified for the BetPawa Premier League after competing in 2019 Normalisation Cup. The people of the town have special passion for football. During match days, they give a firm support to their home club at the Awuah Memorial Park.

== Projects ==
Adamus Resources Limited, in collaboration with the College of Beauty, Arts, and Entrepreneurship, has introduced an initiative known as "Women Empowerment (WE)" in the Ellembelle District of the Western Region. This project aims to support 100 women residing in Anwia, Teleku Bokazo, Kikam, Asanda, Nkroful, Salman, Akanzo, and Akropong by providing them with valuable skills for self-sufficiency.
