= Jewel Ackah =

Ghanaian highlife and gospel musician

- Born: Jewel Ackah c. 1945; Axim, Gold Coast
- Died: 27 April 2018 (aged 72–73); Tema, Ghana
- Occupations: Singer; songwriter
- Years active: 1965–2018
- Musical career
- Genres: Highlife; Gospel music
- Instrument: Vocals

Jewel Ackah (c. 1945 – 27 April 2018) was a Ghanaian highlife and gospel musician. He composed the lyrics of "Arise Arise," the party anthem of the centre-left Ghanaian political party, the National Democratic Congress (NDC), popularly sung to the tune of the Christian hymn, "Stand Up, Stand Up for Jesus". He was dubbed by media pundits as the "Prince of Highlife".

== Early life and education ==
Jewel Ackah was born in 1945 in Axim in the Western Region of Ghana to Emmanuel Ackah and Cecilia Dye. He was a member of the Nzema people. He had his early education at Axim Roman Catholic primary and completed his education in Takoradi in 1963. In his early career, he was a professional footballer and later worked for a shipping company called the Palm Line. Realising that a maritime career was not his calling, he left his job at the Palm Line and joined a traditional drumming group. He soon became the best drummer in the troupe. Ackah was then picked up by the celebrated Ghana musician, Ebo Taylor before he went solo.

== Musical career ==
In his early musical career, he composed largely secular songs before popularising the "gospel music" in Ghana in the 1980s and 1990s. Jewel Ackah played in live dance bands, alongside musicians like Elgrand Kwofie, C.K. Mann and Jos Akins as the master of the band. In 1965, he was a vocalist with the cover-version band the Pick-Ups. Ackah had stints with C.K. Mann's Carousel Seven, the Eldoradoes and the Medican Lantics. In 1974 Jewel recorded his first album ‘Gyaki Mea’ in his native Nzema language which was an instant hit and won him several accolades. He also partnered with Pat Thomas to record the song ‘˜False Lover’ the same year.

While he was still a drummer, he joined the Sweet Beans Band and later became a lead vocalist with the Sweet Talks, at various times between 1975 and 1979 in Tema. He toured the US with C. K. Mann. He had solo trips to Canada, United States, Sweden and other European countries to perform before various live audiences. In 1979, he led a new Sweet Talks line-up of musicians, and recorded Hallelujah! Amen! with a backing group he named S.T. Express.

In 1980, he recorded the solo album, Asomdwee Hene and then joined the Great Pilsner's Band, a brewery-sponsored band that had a short run in popularity. In the same year, Jewel Ackah joined up with guitarist Kwame Nkrumah to make Yeridi a Wu, a re-recording of highlife hits from the 1950s. In the mid-1980s, Ackah recorded the soca-inspired Super Pawa, and then the funk-highlife fusion, London Connection. He released the 1986 album, Electric Highlife, performing with Pat Thomas and A.B. Crentsil. He continued his music career as a soloist and band vocalist in Accra, London and later relocating to Toronto, Canada, in the late 1980s. Jewel Ackah later renamed his band the Butterfly Six.

Jewel Ackah has over 27 albums to his credit. Ackah composed the NDC's anthem, seen as a symbol of the party's political unity. He was also instrumental in the composition of other songs for the party particularly during electoral campaigns.

== Personal life ==
Jewel Ackah had five or eleven children per differing reports. He was also a staunch member of the National Democratic Congress.

== Illness, death and funeral ==
Jewel Ackah suffered a stroke a few years before his death and battled several undisclosed ailments in the last decade of his life. He died at his home in Tema on the night of Friday 27 April 2018, at the age of 73.

In 2017, a report by TV3 journalist, Owusu Worae, inspired a massive public appeal for funds for the singer who had lamented being neglected by society, after falling on hard times.

After his death, a concert was held in Jewel Ackah's memory on Saturday 21 July 2018 at the +233 Jazz Bar & Grill in Accra. Artists who performed at the memorial concert include Gyedu Blay Ambolley, Kwabena Kwabena, Trigmatic, Safohene Gyeni, Dela Botri, eSHUN, Kofi Kinaata, Akua Sika, Rex Omar, Nacee, Joyce Blessing and Akablay.

His funeral service was held at the Community 11 Complex Park in Tema Saturday on 4 August 2018. His remains were buried in his hometown, Axim. A memorial service was held on Sunday 5 August 2018 at the Joshua Generation International Ministries at Taifa where he was a congregant. This was followed by a final tribute concert at the Complex Park in Tema that featured several musicians. His funeral was attended by representatives of the Musicians Union of Ghana (MUSIGA) and Ghana Music Rights Organisation (GHAMRO), including music icons such as Rex Omar, Bessa Simons, A.B. Crenstsil, Ohuma Bosco and others.

The funeral was also attended by former Ghanaian president, Jerry John Rawlings and members of the National Democratic Congress (NDC) such as the General Secretary of the NDC, Johnson Asiedu Nketia, former Organiser of the NDC, Yaw Boateng Gyan and Kofi Totobi-Quakyi.

Upon his death Rawlings tweeted, "You made a significant contribution to the Ghanaian music industry…Your danceable tunes are immortalised in the NDC, helping to catapult its name across the country. Ghana has indeed lost a jewel. Fare thee well Jewel Ackah. Sincere sympathies to the family." Rawlings further noted at the burial service that "Ghana has always been and will always be a country worth dying for", describing Ackah as an "extremely principled person" who "wouldn't have joined us and been such a great inspirer as he turned out to be based on principles. Let's take a look at what he represented, what he was, money didn't come before his values, his values came before money".

== Discography ==
Jewel Ackah's songs include:

Singles and Extended play

- Abena
- Arise Arise
- Asomdwee Hene (1980)
- Bodambo Bodambo
- Dear
- Electric Highlife (1986)
- False Lover (1974)
- Gyaki Mea (1974)
- Hallelujah! Amen! (1979)
- I'm in the Mood
- Jesus
- Joyce Sane Bra
- Kyere Mase
- London Connection
- Manye Yie
- Me Wo Bi
- Supa Pawa (1984)
- Yeridi a Wu (1980)
- Araba
- Mfa Me Ho
- Classic Highlife (1995)
- Me Seke Me Nyulu / Ye Won Be Amgba Gapophone Records

Albums and compilations

- Jewel Ackah with the S.T. Express – Oreyi Me Lele Samedi Soir Haleluyah! Amen! (1980) Pan African Records
- Kwame Nkrumah with Jewel Ackah – Safari And Classical Highlifes – Yeredi Awu (1981) Pan African Records
- London Connection (1984) Dassi Records
- Supa Pawa (1984) Koaky Int'l Records
- Akaraka-Chi Special – Beat for Children All Over the World Vol.I Jetacks Int’l Records
- Electric Hi-Life (1984) Highlife World (1986)
- Jewel Ackah with the Tema Anglican Church Choir – Oh Jesus (1988) Highlife World
- Me Dear (1989) Highlife World, Nakasi Records
- Jewel Ackah and the Butterfly Six – Butu Sela (1993) Ankromiabra Records
- Fe No Ma Me Gapophone Records
- Jewel Ackah and the Butterfly Six – Pull Him Down Bas Records
- Pat Thomas, Jewel Ackah – High-Life – Wɔ Nyim Nti Na Wɔyɛ K Sounds Records
- Sele Mame Gapophone Records
- Dig The Hilife Bump Owusek Productions
- You Better Fly High JVK Productions
- New York Connection Abibirim Inc.
- Butu Sela (2006) Tropic Vibe Productions
- New York Connection (2006) Tropic Vibe Productions
- London Connection (2007) Tropic Vibe Productions
- Akaraka-Chi Tropic (2007) Tropic Vibe Productions
