= Domun (disambiguation) =

Domun may refer to:

== Places ==
- Domun, Ghana
- Domun, Khyber Pakhtunkhwa, Pakistan
- Tumen, Jilin, China

== Other uses ==
- Domun Railway, a former railway in Japanese-occupied Korea
