= Julius Vitringa Coulon =

Dutch politician and colonial administrator

Mayor of Hennaarderadeel
- In office 1875–1878
- Preceded by: Y. Rodenhuis
- Succeeded by: W.J. Bekker

Mayor of Sloten
- In office 1874–1875
- Preceded by: E. Haitsma Mulier
- Succeeded by: C. van Dalsen Fontein

Personal details
- Born: 9 August 1824 Leeuwarden, Netherlands
- Died: 14 July 1878 (aged 53) Wommels, Netherlands
- Spouse: Elisabeth Johanna van Hien

Julius Vitringa Coulon (9 August 1824 – 14 July 1878) was a Dutch politician and colonial administrator who served as commander of several forts on the Dutch Gold Coast and, upon returning to the Netherlands, as mayor of the town of Sloten and the municipality of Hennaarderadeel.

== Biography ==
Julius Vitringa Coulon was born to Aemilius Vitringa Coulon en Nieske Zeper. Both of his grandfathers, dr. Julius Vitringa Coulon (1767-1843) and Pier Zeper served as mayor of Leeuwarden. In 1853, Vitringa Coulon was installed assistant on the Dutch Gold Coast, where he subsequently served as commander of Fort Batenstein at Butre, Fort Crêvecoeur at Accra, and Fort St. Anthony at Axim. In May 1866, Vitringa Coulon retired from service on the Dutch Gold Coast and returned to the Netherlands, where he settled down in Boxmeer.

In 1869, Vitringa Coulon married Elisabeth Johanna van Hien (1840-1918), sister of his colleague Carel van Hien, in Boxmeer. Vitringa Coulon was appointed mayor of Sloten in 1874 and a year later appointed mayor of Hennaarderadeel.

== Map of the District of Axim ==
Map of the District of Axim, drawn by Julius Vitringa Coulon in 1859.

While Vitringa Coulon served as commander of Fort St. Anthony at Axim, the Dutch colonial administration ordered all commanders to draw a map of the area around the fort, as part of an administrative reform aimed at establishing suzerainty over the peoples near the fort. The map Vitringa Coulon drew is kept at the Nationaal Archief in The Hague.
