= Nzema language =

Tano language of Ghana and Ivory Coast

Nzema
- Region: Ghana, Ivory Coast
- Ethnicity: Nzema
- Native speakers: 430,000 (2013–2021)
- Language family: Niger–Congo?: Atlantic–Congo; Kwa; Potou–Tano; Tano; Akan; Bia; South Bia; Nzema

Language codes
- ISO 639-2: nzi
- ISO 639-3: nzi
- Glottolog: nzim1238

Nzema, also known as Nzima or Appolo, is an Akan language spoken by the Nzema people of southwestern Ghana and southeastern Ivory Coast. It is partially intelligible with Jwira-Pepesa and is closely related to Baoulé.

Nzema is one of several Bia languages, and it has had considerable influence from the Twi-Fante language. There are notable towns in Nzemaland such as Bonyere, Nkroful, Half Assini, Axim, Eikwe, Baku, Atuabo, Beyin, Essiama and Anokyi.

== Phonology ==
=== Consonants ===
The following allophones are reported, among others. [p] is rare.

Nzema consonants
| | | Bilabial | Labiodental | | Labial–alveolar | Alveolar | | Palatal (-alveolar) | | Velar | | Labial–velar | Glottal | |
| | | Bilabial | plain | lab. | Labial–alveolar | plain | pal. | plain | lab. | plain | lab. | Labial–velar | plain | lab. |
|---|---|---|---|---|---|---|---|---|---|---|---|---|---|---|
| Nasal | | m | ɱ | | nm | n | | ɲ | ɲʷ | ŋ | ŋʷ | ŋm | | |
| Plosive/ Affricate | voiceless | p | | | tp | t | | tʃ | tʃʷ | k | kʷ | kp | ʔ | |
| Plosive/ Affricate | voiced | b | | | db | d | | dʒ | dʒʷ | ɡ | gʷ | ɡb | | |
| Fricative | voiceless | | f | fʷ | | s | sʲ | ʃ | ʃʷ | | | | h | hʷ |
| Fricative | voiced | | v | vʷ | | z | zʲ | | | | | | ɦ | |
| Approximant | plain | | | | | l | | j | ɥ | ɰ | w | | | |
| Approximant | nasalized | | | | | l̃ | | | | | | | | |

=== Vowels ===
| | Front | | Central | | Back | |
| | oral | nasal | oral | nasal | oral | nasal |
|---|---|---|---|---|---|---|
| Close | i | ĩ | | | u | ũ |
| Near-close | ɪ | ɪ̃ | | | ʊ | ʊ̃ |
| Close-mid | e | | | | o | |
| Open-mid | ɛ | ɛ̃ | | | ɔ | ɔ̃ |
| Near-open | | | ɐ | ɐ̃ | | |
| Open | | | a | ã | | |

== Writing system ==
Nzema alphabet
| Uppercase | A | B | D | Ɛ | E | F | G | H | I | K | L | M | N | Ɔ | O | P | R | S | T | U | V | W | Y | Z |
| Lowercase | a | b | d | ɛ | e | f | g | h | i | k | l | m | n | ɔ | o | p | r | s | t | u | v | w | y | z |

== Bibliography ==
- Burmeister, Jonathan L. (1976). "A comparison of variable nouns in Anyi-Sanvi and Nzema". Annales de l'Université d'Abidjan. H (Linguistique 9): 7–19.
- Berry, J. (1955). "Some Notes on the Phonology of the Nzema and Ahanta Dialects". Bulletin of the School of Oriental and African Studies. 17 (1): 160–165. doi:10.1017/S0041977X00106421. ISSN 1474-0699.
- Chinebuah, Isaac Kodwo (1973). Grammatical categories of the verbal piece in Nzema (PhD thesis). School of Oriental and African Studies, University of London. doi:10.25501/SOAS.00028550.
