= Nzema District =

Nzema District Council
- Former District Council
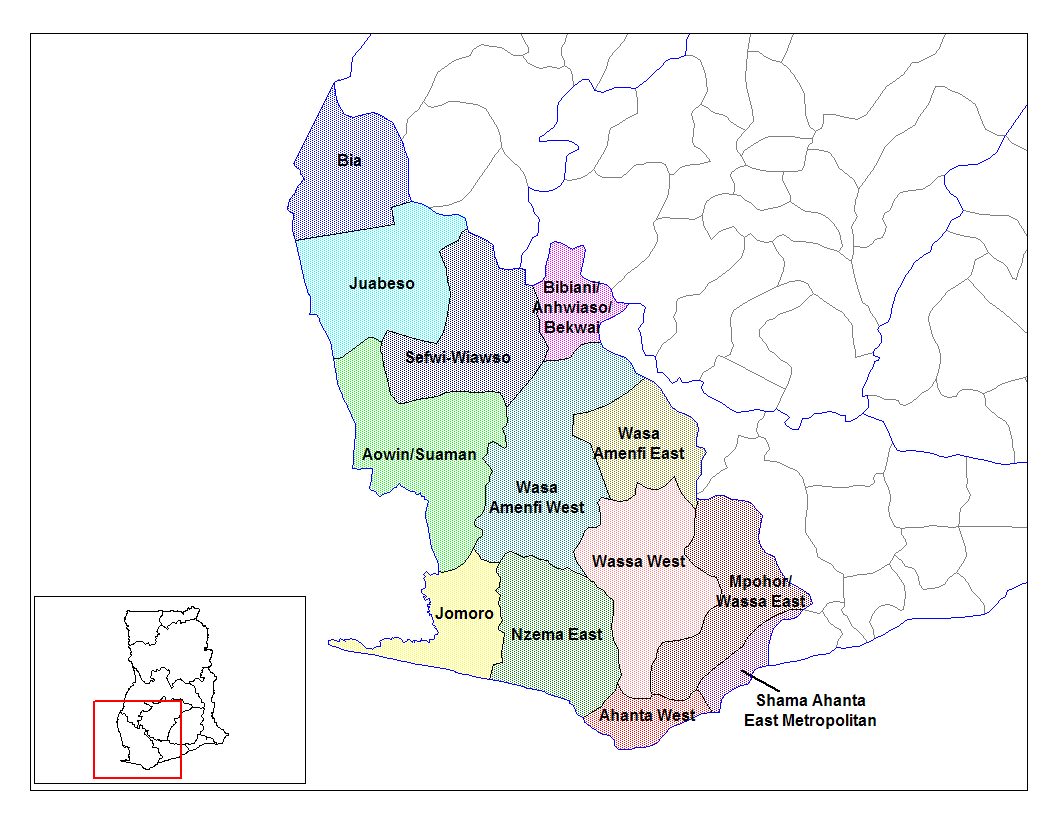
- Districts of Western Region

- Location of Nzema District Council within Western
- Coordinates: 5°5′35″N 3°6′5″W
- Country: Ghana
- Region: Western
- Capital: Half Assini
- Time zone: UTC+0 (GMT)
- ISO 3166 code: GH-WP-NZ

Nzema District is a former district council that was located in Western Region, Ghana. It was originally created as a district council in 1975. However, in 1988, it was split off into two new district assemblies: Jomoro District (capital: Half Assini) and Nzema East District (capital: Axim). The district council was located in the southern part of Western Region and had Half Assini as its capital town.
