= Nkroful =

Village in Western Region, Ghana

- District Capital
- Location of Nkroful in Western Region, South Ghana
- Coordinates: 4°57′50″N 2°19′20″W
- Country: Ghana
- Region: Western Region
- District: Ellembelle District
- Elevation: 71 m (233 ft)
- Time zone: GMT
  - Summer (DST): GMT

Nkroful is a village and the capital of the Ellembelle District in the Western Region of Ghana, located near Axim in the Nzema East Municipal. The village is the birthplace of Kwame Nkrumah, Ghana's first president.

== History ==
The village of Nkroful was once under the Western Nzema Kingdom, which dates back to 1470. It is now under the Eastern Nzema Traditional Area. Kwesie Kutuah was the first known chief of the village in 1911.

As of 2023, the family head of Nkroful is Abusuapanyinli Senza Erzah and the Chief of Nkroful is Nana Kwasi Kutuah V.

== Geography ==
=== Location ===
Nkroful stands inland 5 km (3 miles) from the coastal highway at the Essiama town junction turnoff.

=== Climate ===
The village lies in the semi-equatorial climatic zone of West Africa. It experiences all-year round rainfall with the high amounts occurring between May and June.

== Education ==
The village only has one senior high school, the Nkroful Agricultural Senior High School, which was established in 1972.

== Nkrumah Mausoleum ==
Initially being buried in Guinea, Nkrumah was buried in Nkroful on 9 July 1972 at the original Nkrumah Mausoleum and monument. His remains were later laid to rest at the Kwame Nkrumah Mausoleum in Accra in 1992.

== See also ==
- Nzema people
- Kwame Nkrumah Mausoleum
