= Domunli =

- Town
- Location in Ghana
- Coordinates: 4°50′18″N 2°12′27″W
- Country: Ghana
- Regions: Western Region
- District: Jomoro District
- Elevation: 1 m (3.3 ft)

Population (2013)
  - Total: very small
- Time zone: UTC0 (GMT)
  - Summer (DST): GMT
- Area code: +233 (0) 31 3 plus 6 digit number

Domunli is a town in the Western Region of Ghana. The town is south of Agufo on the Atlantic coast of Ghana. It is located 100 kilometres (62 mi) west of the regional capital, Takoradi, and is in the Jomoro District. The town is the site of a 900 megawatts of electric power plant for Ghana. The power plant is managed by the Domunli Gas Processing Project.

Other towns that surround Domunli include Domun, Ejan, Dentokrom.
