= Apewosika =

Apewosika may refer to the following places in Ghana:

- Apewosika (Central Region)
- Apewosika (Western Region)
