= Atuabo =

Coordinates: 4°59′N 2°33′W

- Urban area
- Location within Ghana
- Country: Ghana
- Region: Western Region
- Time zone: GMT
  - Summer (DST): GMT

Atuabo is a town in the Western Region of Ghana noted for the situation of the Ghana Gas Company's Atuabo Gas Plant and the proposed Atuabo Freeport. It is one of many small towns such as Eikwe and Baku (also called Beku) along the beautiful coastal beaches of Nzemaland in the Western Region of Ghana.

Atuabo (Locally pronounced in Nzema as Adoabo) is the last small town that is part of the Ellembelle constituency along the coast of Nzema.
