= Atuabo Gas Plant =

Natural gas processing plant in Atuabo, Western, Ghana

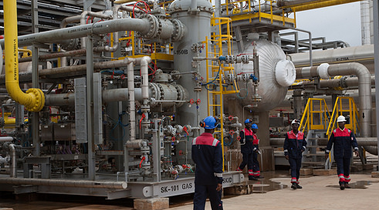

- Location within Ghana Atuabo Gas Plant (Africa)

General information
- Type: Natural Gas Processing Plant
- Location: Atuabo, Western Region
- Coordinates: 4.97865°N 2.53094°W
- Current tenants: Ghana Gas Company
- Construction started: July 2011
- Completed: January 2016
- Owner: Government of Ghana

Atuabo Gas Plant is the Natural Gas Processing Plant of the Ghana Gas Company located at Atuabo, a small coastal community, in the Nzemaland (Ellembele District) of the Western Region in Ghana.

== History ==
Construction of the Atuabo Gas Plant started in July 2011 as part of a national initiative called the Western Corridor Gas Project to establish an integrated gas processing infrastructure that sources natural gas from Ghana's foremost oil field, the Jubilee Oil Field, and other oil fields (TEN) and processing into liquefied petroleum gas (LPG) for domestic use while contributing significant megawatts (MW) to support Ghana's energy supply. Prior to the operationalization of the Atuabo Gas Processing Plant, Ghana's Jubilee Field was simply flaring the associated gas to the oil being produced.

Before the construction of the Atuabo Gas Plant, Ghana sourced all of its natural gas from Nigeria through the West African Gas Pipeline (WAGP). Natural gas imports from Nigeria became unreliable, partially as a result of feedstock constraints in Nigeria, but also because Ghana was unable to meet its debt obligations to WAGP company on time resulting in a temporal suspension of gas exports to Ghana in June 2016. Thus, the investment into this natural gas processing plant was in part to also provide a vital cushion for the unreliable gas supply from Nigeria to feed Ghana's thermal plants.

The project was financed through a US$3 billion Master Facility Agreement from the China Development Bank (CDB) and the Chinese government and constructed by UNIPEC, is a subsidiary of Sinopec, a Chinese Petroleum Company. The plant was expected to be in full operation by 2016 but due to lack of funds, the project suffered delays in completion, missing several completion deadlines. In 2014, construction was halted for close to 10 months considering the fact that the disbursement of the CDB facility had been slow.

Besides financial constraints, land dispute issues played a key role in drawing back the completion project. in June 2014, a high court placed a 14-day injunction on construction works after the Eastern Nzema Traditional Council petitioned the courts citing that the Ghana Gas Company had failed to lawfully acquire the 300-acre land from the traditional authority, for the purposes of constructing a natural gas processing plant. Construction of the plant displaced about 120 farmers in three communities; Atuabo, Assemnda Suazo, and Anokyi.

The project's infrastructure was mechanically completed in November, 2014 and fully commissioned in April, 2015.

== Operations and contributions to Ghana's energy supply ==
The plant is now a source of reliable gas supply for the Aboadze Thermal Plant to generate electricity to supplement power needs of Ghanaian homes and businesses which hitherto heavily relied on power from the Akosombo hydroelectric power plant. According to the Ghana National Gas Company, the Atuabo Gas plant has a design capacity of 150 MMScfd and normal operating capacity of 120 MMScfd but by January 2021, it had tripled its production capacity from 90 million standard cubic metres per day in 2016 to 300 million standard cubic metres per day.
