= Atuabo Freeport =

Freeport infrastructure in Ghana

Coordinates: 4.9750°N 2.5321°W

Atuabo Freeport is an ongoing infrastructure likely to be Ghana's third major port.

== Location ==
The FreePort will be located within the Gulf of Guinea.

== Facilities ==
The Free Port will have facilities including an 18.5 m (61 ft) deep channel and three quays of varying depths from 16.5 m (54 ft), 12 m (39 ft) and 9 m (30 ft), clear activity zones including Offshore Logistics, Subsea Fabrication. There will also be facilities in place for Rig and Vessel Repair, Business Technology Park and General Business Support Infrastructure which will make it first of its kind in the West African subregion.

== See also ==
- Atuabo
- Ghana National Gas Company
