= Domun, Ghana =

Domun
- Town
- Location of Tema in Western Region, South West Ghana
- Coordinates: 4.8°0′N 2.2°0′W
- Country: Ghana
- District: Jomoro District
- Elevation: 1 m (3.3 ft)

Population (2013)
  - Total: very small
- Time zone: UTC0 (GMT)
  - Summer (DST): GMT
- Area code: +233 (0) 31 3 plus 6 digit number

Domun is a town in the Western Region of Ghana. The town is north of Domunli on the Atlantic coast of Ghana. It is located 100 kilometres (62 mi) west of the regional capital, Takoradi, in the region of Western Region, and is in the Jomoro District. Other towns that surround Domun are Domunli, Agufo, Ejan, Dentokrom.
