= George Yankey =

Ghanaian lawyer and politician

George Sipa-Adjah Yankey

Minister for Health
- In office Feb 2009 – Oct 2009
- President: John Atta Mills
- Preceded by: Courage Quashigah
- Succeeded by: Benjamin Kunbuor

Personal details
- Born: Nzema Region, Ghana
- Party: National Democratic Congress
- Profession: Lawyer

George Sipa-Adjah Yankey is a Ghanaian lawyer and politician. He is the former CEO of Ghana Gas and served as Minister for Health of Ghana during the Atta Mills government.

== Education ==
Yankey attended Nsein Senior High School for his Ordinary level Certificate. He studied at the Ghana School of Law. He obtained his PhD in 1987 from the University of Warwick in the United Kingdom.

== Career ==
Yankey worked in the Ministry of Finance of Ghana and was the head of its Legal department between 1989 and 1995. He became Director of the Legal, Private Sector and Financial Institutions Department at the same ministry from 1996.

== Politics ==
Yankey is a member of the National Democratic Congress. After the 2008 presidential election, President John Atta Mills appointed him Minister for Health in his government in February 2009.

Following investigations conducted by the Serious Fraud Office of the United Kingdom, Mabey and Johnson Limited, a supplier of steel bridging based at Twyford, Berkshire was prosecuted in 2009. This followed the company disclosing that it had "sought to influence decision-makers in public contracts in Jamaica and Ghana" between 1993 and 2001. Five Ghanaian officials, including Yankey, who was alleged to have received £15,000, were cited by the company. Yankey denied these allegations in a statement issued after Mabey and Johnson had been fined £6.6 million by the Southwark Crown Court. Despite his denials however, Yankey resigned as Minister for Health in order to concentrate on clearing his name. His resignation was accepted by President Mills, who in addition, invited the Commission on Human Rights and Administrative Justice to investigate the case.

=== Ghana National Gas Company ===
After the investigation Dr. Yankey was cleared of all charges. He was appointed by President John Atta Mills as CEO of the Ghana National Gas Company. In his role he was responsible for leading the company and building the infrastructure for sustainable gas distribution across Ghana. He was succeeded by Benjamin Asante in February 2017.

== See also ==
- List of Mills government ministers
- National Democratic Congress

Political offices
Preceded by Courage Quashigah	Minister for Health; 2009	Succeeded by Benjamin Kunbuor
