= Nzema people =

Ethnic group in Ghana and Ivory Coast

Nzema
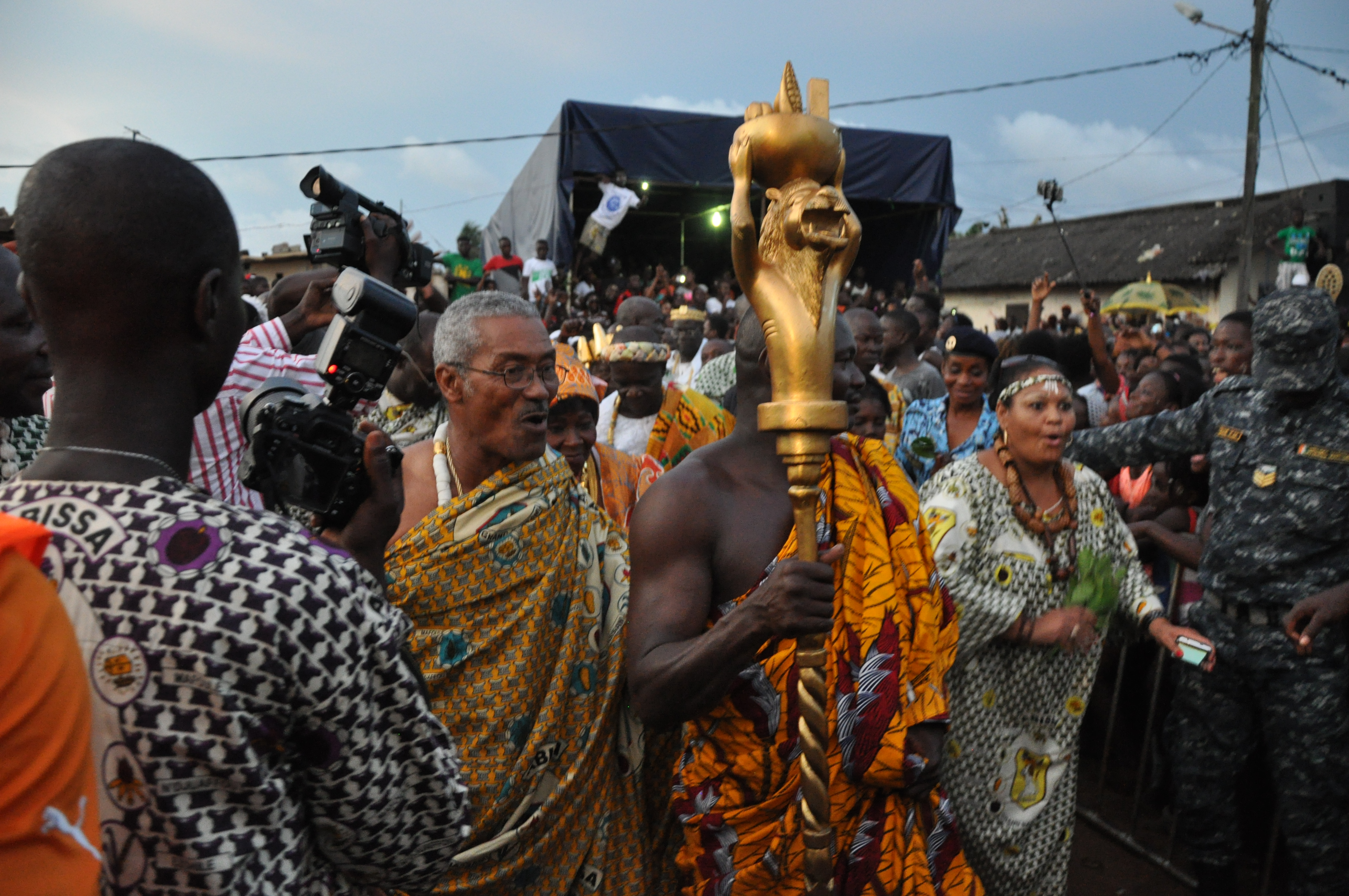

Total population
- ~500,000

Regions with significant populations
- Western Region of Ghana, Ivory Coast

Languages
- Nzema, English, French

Religion
- Christianity, African Traditional Religion, Islam

Related ethnic groups
- Akan

The Nzema are an ethnic group numbering about 328,700, of whom 262,000 live in southwestern Ghana and 66,700 live in the southeast of Côte d'Ivoire. In Ghana, the Nzema area is divided into three electoral districts: Nzema East Municipal, also known as Evalue Gwira; Ellembele; and Nzema West, also known as Jomoro. Their language is also known as Nzima or Appolo.

The Nzema are mostly farmers. According to their traditional calendar, days are ordered in cycles of seven, and these follow each other in a three-week cycle. They have a matrilineal kinship system, with descent and property passed through the maternal lines.

A religious Kundum Festival is held annually all over the Ahanta and Nzema areas. Its start is timed to coordinate with the harvest period, so local communities determine when that will be. It begins in the easternmost part of Ahanta and advances southwestward together with the harvest period. Ritual drumming, singing, and dancing take place for four weeks, and are considered the way the community expels devils and protects its good fortune. This festival is the main occasion on which the satirical avudewene songs are performed by young men.

== Notable people ==
- Kwame Nkrumah (1909-1972), pan-Africanist and Ghana's first president
- Alfred Augustus Akainyah (1907-1988) was a Ghanaian lawyer and jurist. He was a barrister-at-law and a Supreme Court Judge during the first republic.
- George Alfred Grant (1878-1956), popularly known as Paa Grant, was a merchant and politician in the Gold Coast who has been called "the father of Gold Coast politics".
- Anton Wilhelm Amo (c. 1703-c. 1759), African-born German philosopher.
- Maame Harris Tani (d. 1958), religious leader.
- Meiway (born in 1962), Ivorian musician.
- Jean-Baptiste Mockey, Ivorian politician.
- Most Reverend Charles Gabriel Angela Palmer-Buckle (born in 1950), Ghanaian Archbishop of the Roman Catholic Church.
- Isaac Chinebuah (1926-2006), an academic and the foreign minister in the People's National Party (PNP) government of the Third Republic of Ghana..
- Lee Tandoh Ocran (1945-2019), Ghanaian politician who served as Minister for Education of Ghana from 2012 to 2013.
- Samia Yaba Christina Nkrumah (born in 1960), Ghanaian politician and chairperson of the Convention People's Party. She is the daughter of Kwame Nkrumah, first President of Ghana.
- Frederick Worsemao Armah Blay (born in 1951), Ghanaian politician and a member of the Second, Third and Fourth Parliament of the Fourth Republic of Ghana.
- Emmanuel Armah Kofi Buah (born in 1966), a Ghanaian politician who served in the government of Ghana as Minister of Energy and Petroleum in the John Mahama administration from 2013 to 2016.
- David Brigidi (1962-2018), a lawyer by profession, was elected Senator for the Bayelsa Central constituency of Bayelsa State, Nigeria at the start of the Nigerian Fourth Republic, running on the People's Democratic Party (PDP) platform.
- Jewel Ackah (1945-2018), Ghanaian highlife and gospel musician.
- Lieutenant General Peter Augustine Blay, Ghanaian military officer, was the Chief of Defence Staff of the Ghana Armed Forces.
- James Van Leuven Mensah (1937-2021), Ghanaian accountant, public servant, banker, and politician.
- George Yankey, Ghanaian lawyer and politician. He is the former CEO of Ghana Gas and served as Minister for Health of Ghana.
- Robert Samuel Blay (1901-1979), Ghanaian barrister and judge. He was a Justice of the Supreme Court of Ghana during the First Republic.
- Philip Edward Archer (1925-2002), Chief Justice of Ghana between 1991 and 1995.
- J. Y. A Kwofie, a Ghanaian police officer, was the Inspector General of Police of the Ghana Police Service from 1 January 1990 to 30 September 1996.
- Abraham Philip Akpor Kojo Kainya, known as Lord Kenya, a former Ghanaian Hiplife artist who is currently an Evangelist.
- Peter Famiyeh Bozah, known by the stage name Fameye, is a Ghanaian rapper and musician.
- Ivan Addae Mensah, a Ghanaian chemist and university administrator who served as the Vice-Chancellor of the University of Ghana, Legon from 1996 to 2002. He is an Emeritus Professor of Chemistry at the same institution. He is a Life Fellow of the Royal Society of Chemistry, Fellow of the Ghana Academy of Arts and Sciences, and a Fellow of the Ghana Chemical Society.
- Professor Kaku Sagary Nokoe, former Acting Vice Chancellor of the University for Development Studies.
- Matilda Amissah-Arthur, She served as the Second Lady of Ghana from 2012 to 2017. She was married to the late former Vice President of Ghana, Kwesi Amissah-Arthur.
- Mary Chinery-Hesse, an international civil servant and diplomat serving as the first woman Chancellor of the University of Ghana. She was the first female Deputy Director-General of the International Labour Organization.
- Mokowa Blay Adu-Gyamfi, She was part of the first batch of doctors to be trained in Ghana.[3] As of 2022, she is the Presidential advisor on HIV/AIDS at the Office of the President of Ghana.
- Paa Kwasi, is a Ghanaian highlife singer, songwriter, and performer; he was a former lead member of the music group Dobble.
- Bozoma Afiba Mamekyi Saint John (née Arthur; born January 21, 1977) is a Ghanaian-American businessperson and marketing executive who was the chief marketing officer (CMO) at Netflix from August 2020 to March 2022.

== See also ==
- Aby Lagoon
