= Ellembelle District =

District in Western Region, Ghana

- District
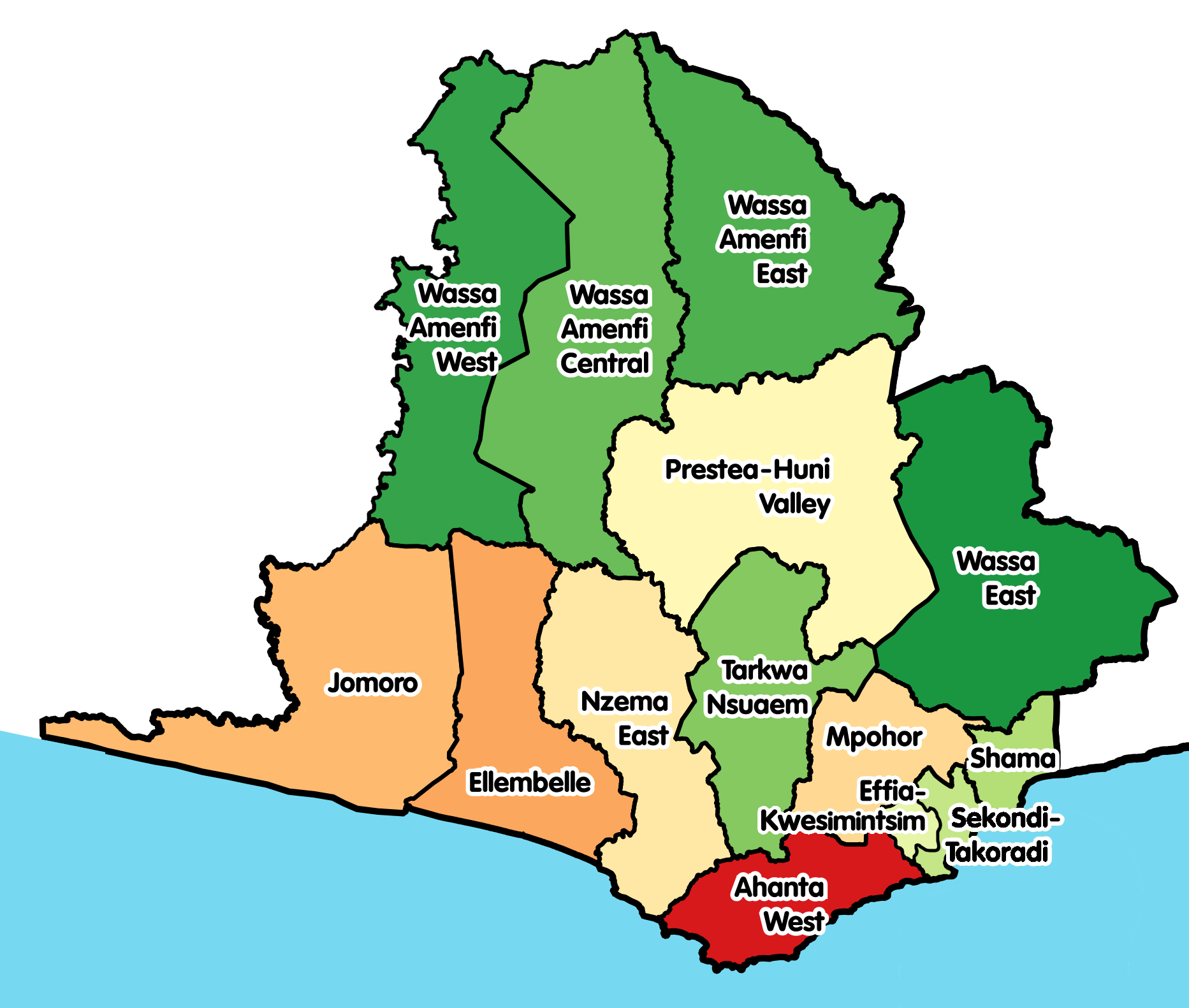
- Districts of Western Region

- Location of Ellembelle District within Western
- Coordinates: 4°57′50″N 2°19′20″W
- Country: Ghana
- Region: Western
- Capital: Nkroful

Government
  - District Executive: Mr. Kwasi Bonzoh
  - Succeeded: Hon. Saed Ramadan Yankey

Area
  - Total: 999.7 km^{2} (386.0 sq mi)

Population (2021)
  - Total: 120,893
  - Density: 120.9/km^{2} (313.2/sq mi)
- Time zone: UTC+0 (GMT)
- ISO 3166 code: GH-WP-EL

Ellembelle District is one of the fourteen districts in Western Region, Ghana. Originally it was part of the then-larger Nzema East District in 1988, which was created from the former Nzema District Council, until the western part of the district was split off by a decree of then-president John Agyekum Kufuor on 29 February 2008 to create Ellembelle District; thus the remaining part has been retained as Nzema East District (which was later elevated to municipal district assembly status in that same year to become Nzema East Municipal District). The district assembly is located in the southwest part of Western Region and has Nkroful as its capital town.

== Places of interest ==
The Ellembelle District Assembly is located at Nkroful, the birthplace of Kwame Nkrumah.

== Towns and Villages ==
=== Towns ===
- Asasetre
- Esiama
- Nkroful
- Aiyinasi

=== Villages ===
- Teleku Bokazo
- Alabokazo
- A.B.Bokazo
- Akpandue
- Edwakpole
- Adubrim
- Alabokazo
- Anokyi
- Asanta
- Asemko
- Asemndasuazo
- Atuabo
- Awiebo
- Bakanta
- Agona Swedru
- Bobrama
- Dogbeyvi Kordzi
- Eikwe
- Kamgbunli
- Azulenuanu
- Kikam
- Krisan
- Ngalekpole
- Ngalekyi
- Sanzule

== Places to go ==
=== Food ===
- Georgia Breeze Restaurant
- African Base Restaurant And Pub
- January to December Restaurant

=== Hotels ===
- Bekanty Lodge Assinie

== Notable People ==
- Kwame Nkrumah
- Freddie Blay
- Emmanuel Armah-Kofi Buah

== Sources ==
- "Districts of Ghana". Statoids.
- GhanaDistricts.com
