= Fort Saint Anthony =

Material cultural heritage site in Ghana

- Part of Dutch Gold Coast
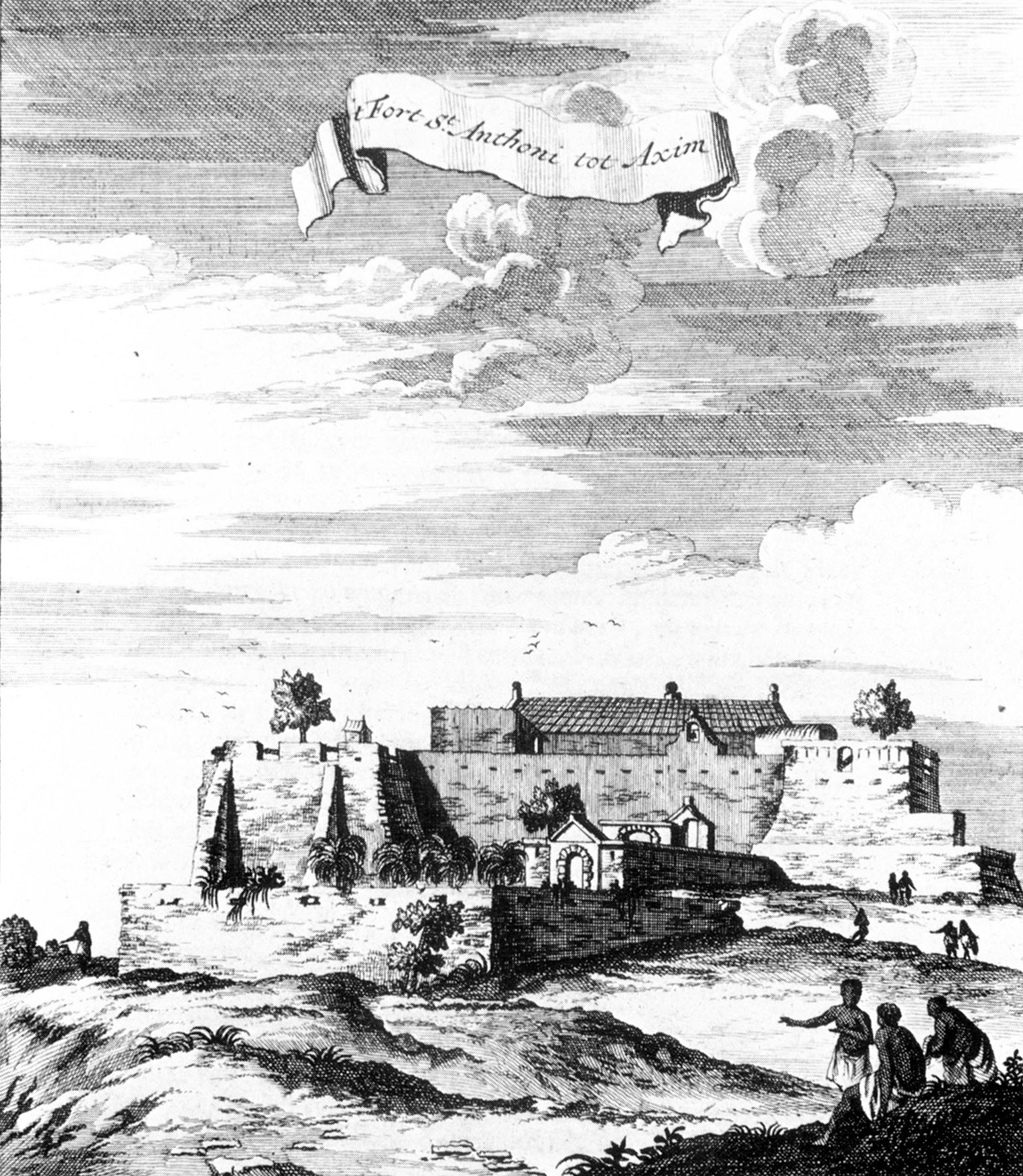
- Fort Santo Antonio in Axim in 1709.

Location
- Coordinates: 4.8680°N 2.2444°W

Site history
- Built: 1515

Garrison information
- Occupants: Portugal (1515–1642); Netherlands (1642–1872); United Kingdom (1872–1957); Ghana (1957–Present)

UNESCO World Heritage Site
- Part of: Forts and Castles, Volta, Greater Accra, Central and Western Regions
- Criteria: Cultural: (vi)
- Reference: 34-005
- Inscription: 1979 (3rd Session)

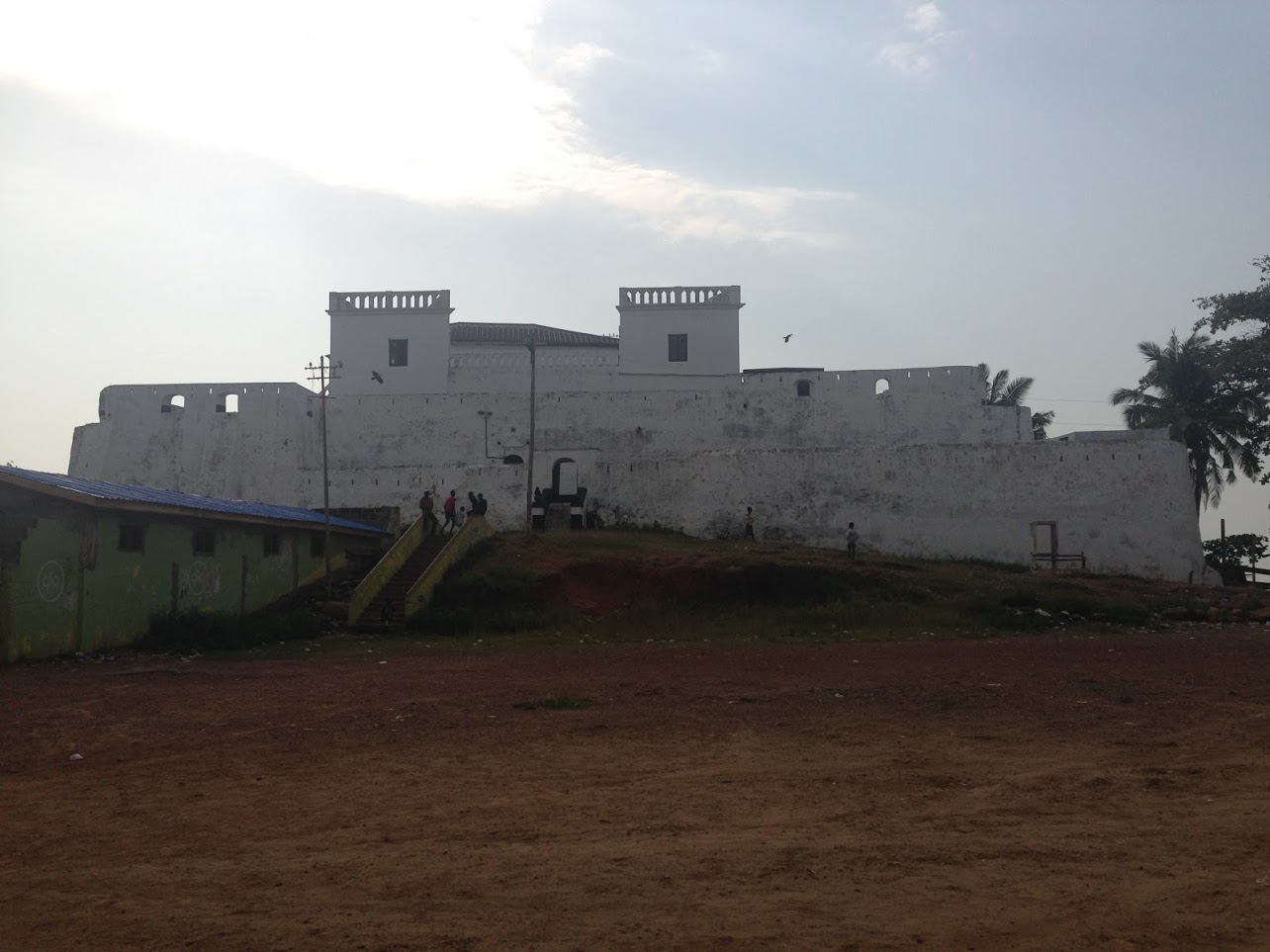
Fort Saint Anthony

Fort Saint Anthony (Portuguese: Forte de Santo António; Dutch: Fort Sint Anthony) was a fort built by the Portuguese in 1515 near the town of Axim, in what is now Ghana. In 1642, the Dutch captured the fort and subsequently made it part of the Dutch Gold Coast. The Dutch expanded the fort considerably before they turned it over, with the rest of their colony, to the British in 1872. The fort is now the property of the Ghanaian state and is open to the public.

As the westernmost fort of the Dutch possessions, Fort Saint Anthony was the first fort encountered by Dutch traders, and the place where provisions and fresh water were taken in. Fort Saint Anthony remained an important fort in the Dutch possessions, with its commandant serving as senior commissioner (Dutch: oppercommies) in the Colonial Council in Elmina, together with the commandant of Fort Nassau at Moree, the commandant of Fort Crèvecoeur at Accra, and the commandant of the factory at Ouidah, on the Dutch Slave Coast. In contrast to many other Dutch possessions on the Gold Coast, Fort Saint Anthony was never abandoned during the 19th century, and remained occupied until 1872. Because of its testimony to European pre-colonial and colonial trade and exploitation, Fort Saint Anthony was inscribed on the UNESCO World Heritage List in 1979 along with several other castles and forts in Ghana.

== History ==
Due to a lack of study of the Portuguese archives of the sixteenth century, little is known about the early years of Fort Saint Anthony and about the reason for the Portuguese to settle themselves at Axim, although a desire to control the gold trade in the area seems a logical motivation. The first evidence of Portuguese involvement near Axim is a letter from the governor of Elmina to the King of Portugal from 1503, to send construction materials to captain Diogo d'Alvarenga, who was in charge of the construction of the "House of Axem." After this house was destructed by local peoples, the Portuguese constructed a new post slightly more to the east, probably on the site on which the current Fort Saint Anthony still stands.

In contrast to the other forts on the Gold Coast, the authority of the commander of fort Saint Anthony reached far beyond the fort and the town of Axim. In the Treaty of Axim that the Netherlands signed in 1642 with local peoples after their conquest of Saint Anthony from the Portuguese in the same year, they claim joint jurisdiction over a number of settlements surrounding Axim, pretending to have inherited this jurisdiction from the Portuguese. Moreover, in November 1656, at the request of Director-General Jan Valckenburgh, a declaration was signed by representatives of Gyommre, "Abripiquem," Ankobra, Ebokro, Axim and "Encasser," in which they declared to have been allies since time immemorial, and to always have put their disputes in front of the commandant of Fort Saint Anthony at Axim.

The large area of jurisdiction is thought to be the result of Portuguese attempts in the early 17th century to restore their dominance in the gold trade—which in recent years had been taken over by the Dutch—by directly accessing the sources of the gold trade in the interior. In 1623, the Portuguese founded a fortified outpost on the Ankobra River, some 20 kilometres from Axim, near the present-day village of Bamianko, from which they established a gold mine on Aboasi Hill, some eight kilometres from this outpost. After the Dutch conquered Axim, they took over the Portuguese attempt to control the gold trade in the interior. However, the fort that they built for this purpose on the Ankobra River, Fort Ruychaver, was blown up by its commandant only five years after its construction, after a conflict with local people.

After the Dutch West India Company lost its monopoly on the slave trade in 1730, it tried to develop cotton plantations at Axim.

The commandant of Fort Saint Anthony continued to have some legal jurisdiction over the mentioned indigenous states well into the 19th century. When in the late 1850s the Dutch reformed their possessions on the Gold Coast into districts and instructed their fort commandants—now referred to as "residents"—to make reports of the peoples under its jurisdiction, the resident of Fort Saint Anthony, Julius Vitringa Coulon, indeed drew a map which displays a jurisdiction similar to the one proclaimed by Valckenburgh.

== 3D Model ==
In 2013, the Zamani Project documented Fort Saint Anthony with terrestrial 3D laser scanning. The non-profit research group from the University of Cape town (South Africa) specialises in 3D digital documentation of tangible cultural heritage. The data generated by the Zamani Project creates a permanent record that can be used for research, education, restoration, and conservation. A 3D model, panorama tour and plans of Fort Saint Anthony are available on www.zamaniproject.org.

== Gallery ==
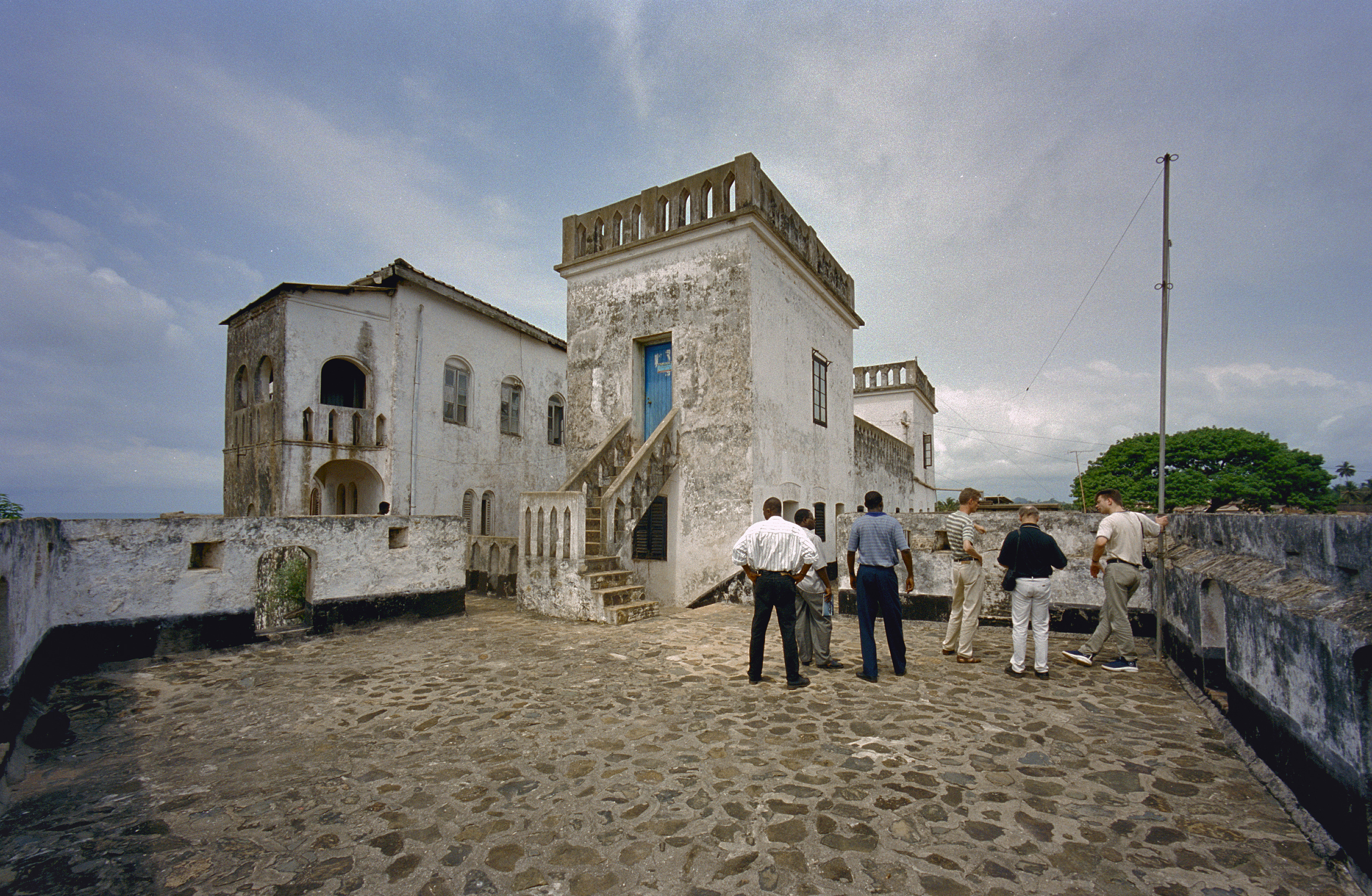
Fort Saint Anthony today.

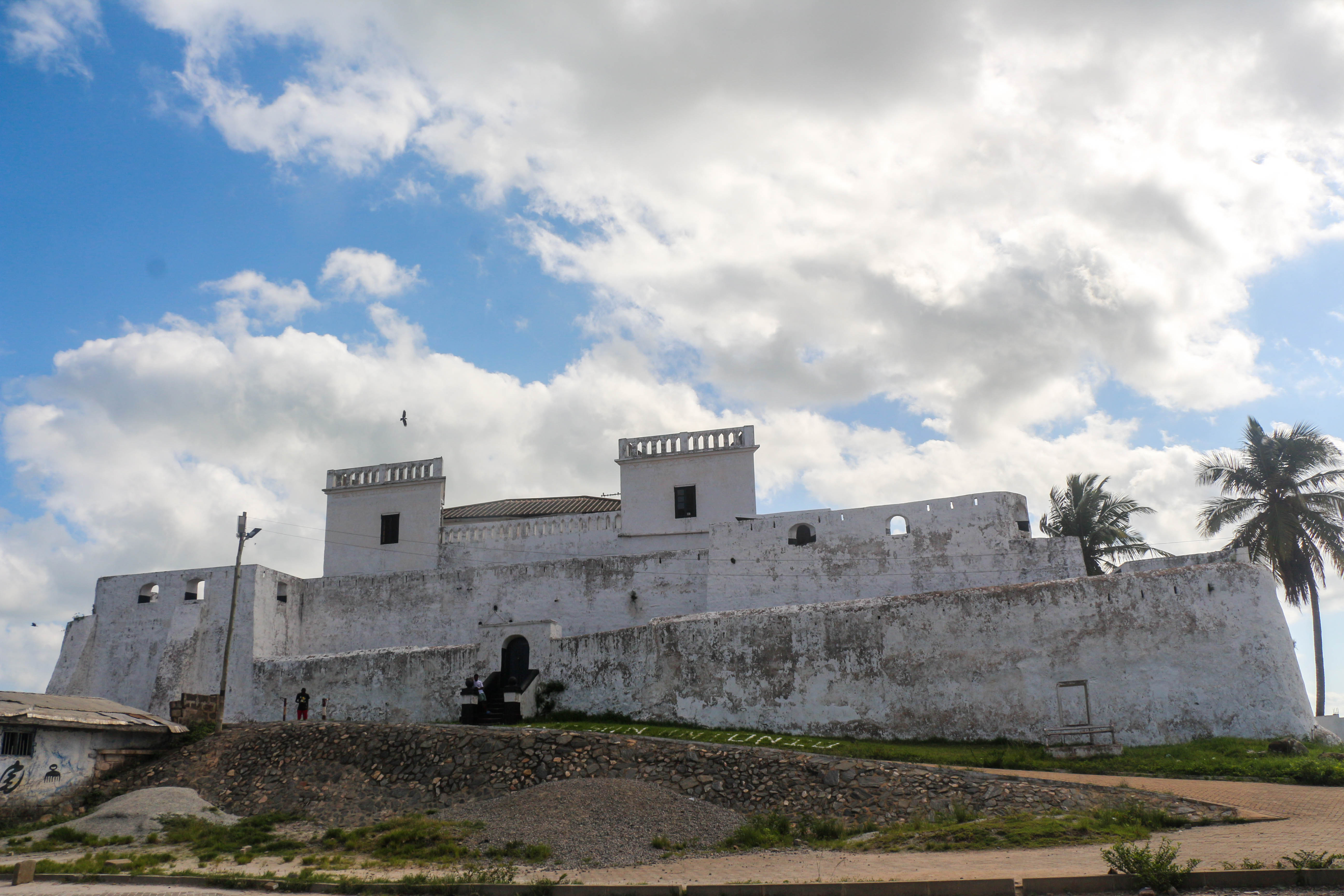
Fort Saint Anthony at Axim, Ghana

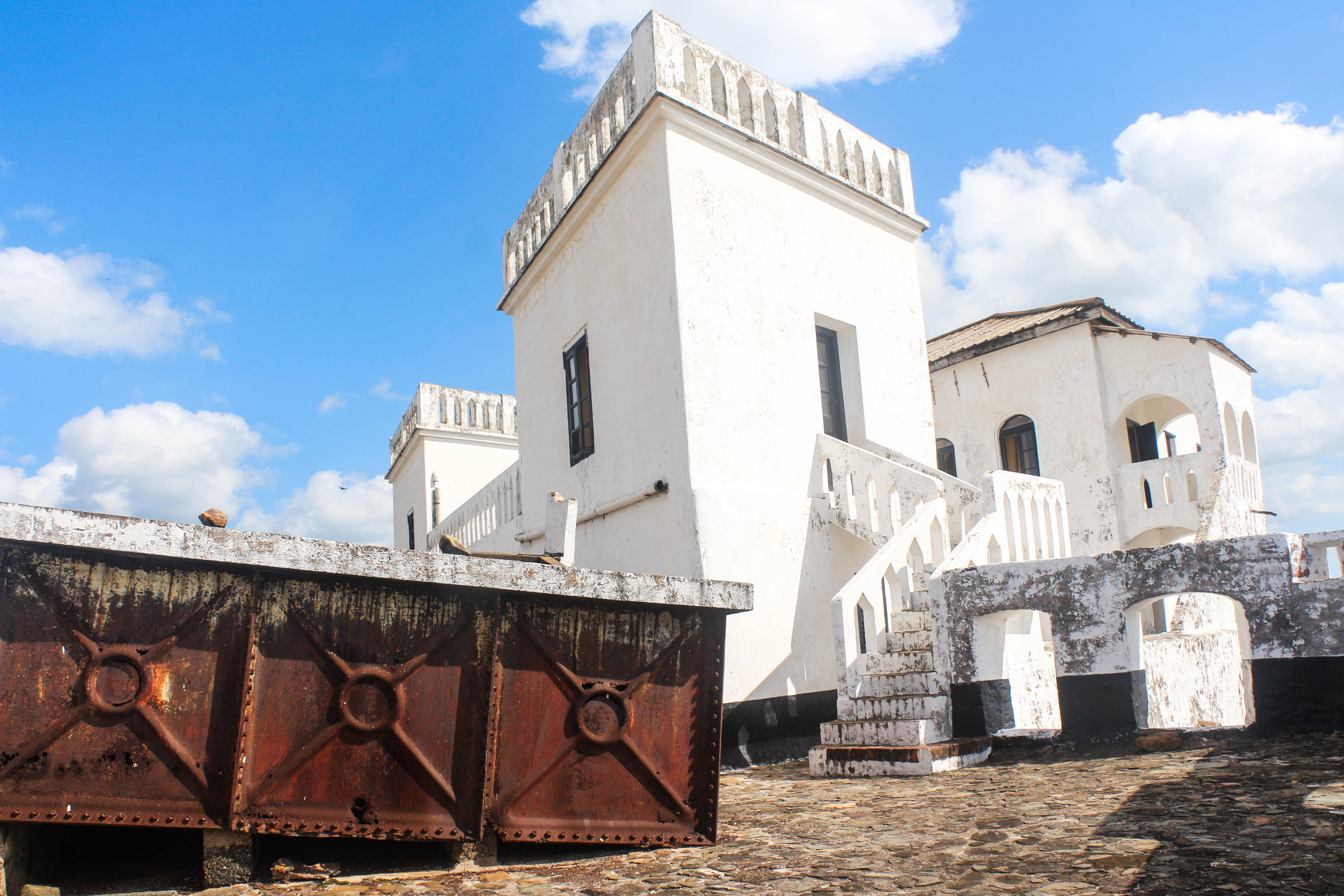
Fort Saint Anthony at Axim, Ghana

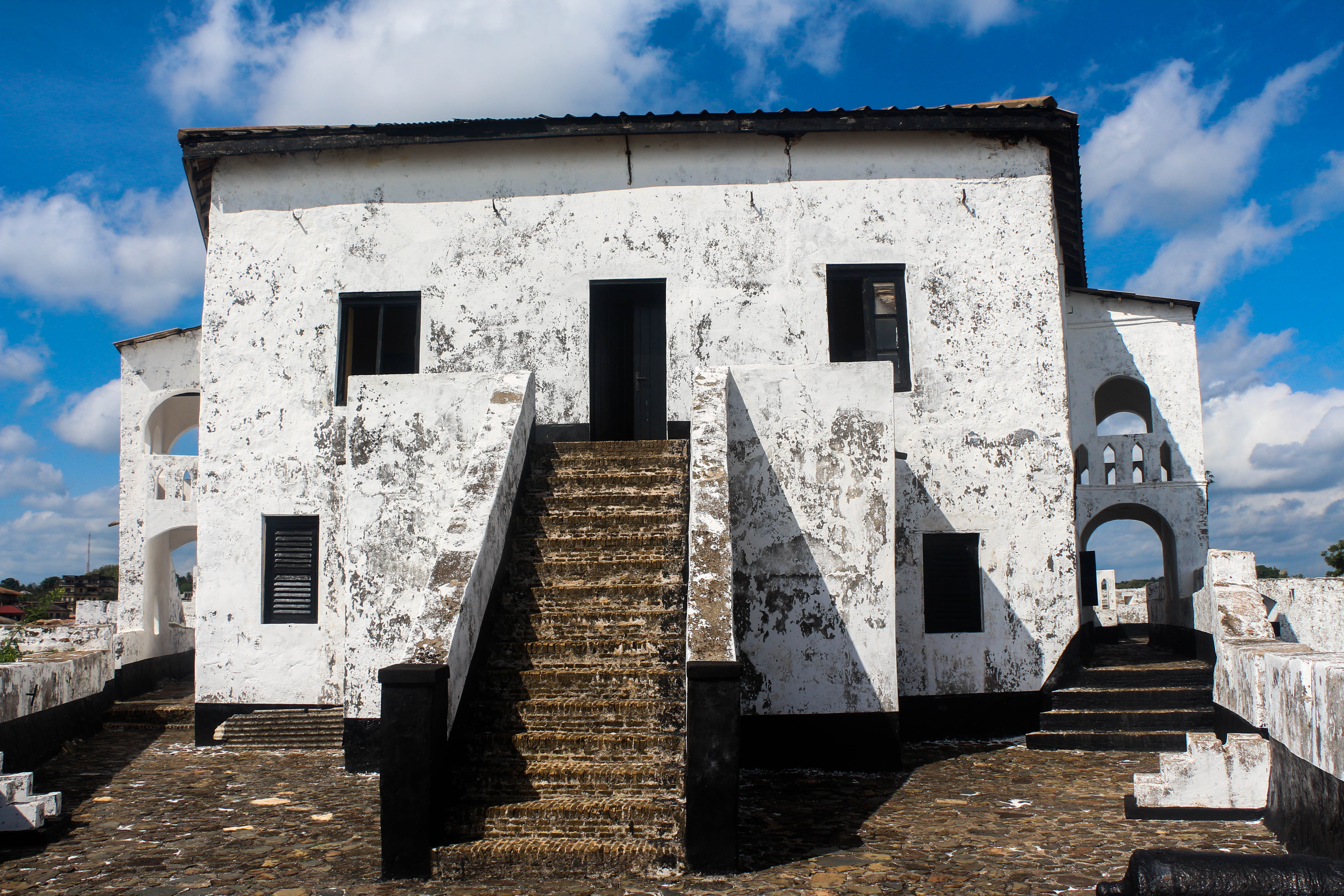
Fort Saint Anthony at Axim, Ghana

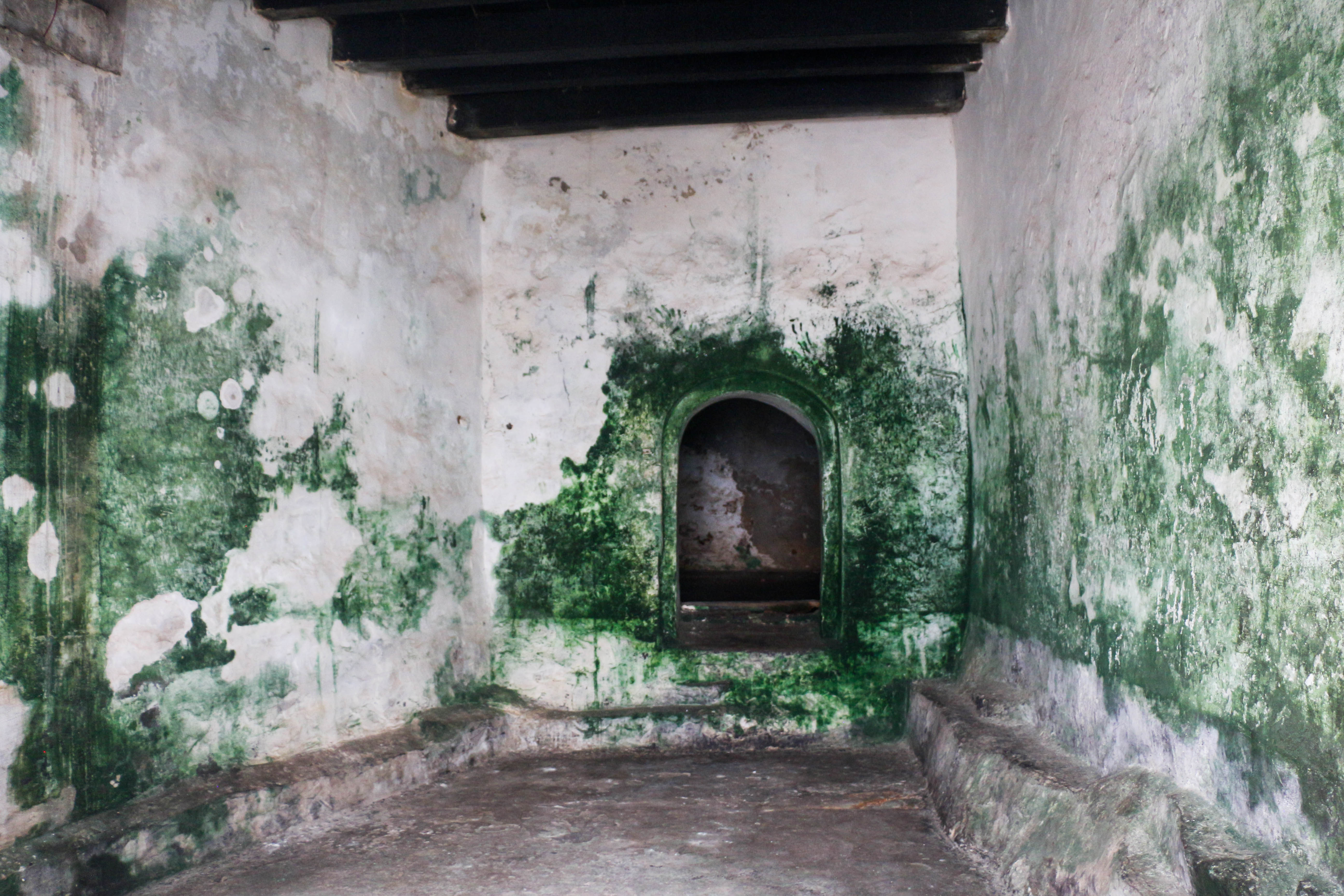
Prison cell at Fort Saint Anthony at Axim in Ghana

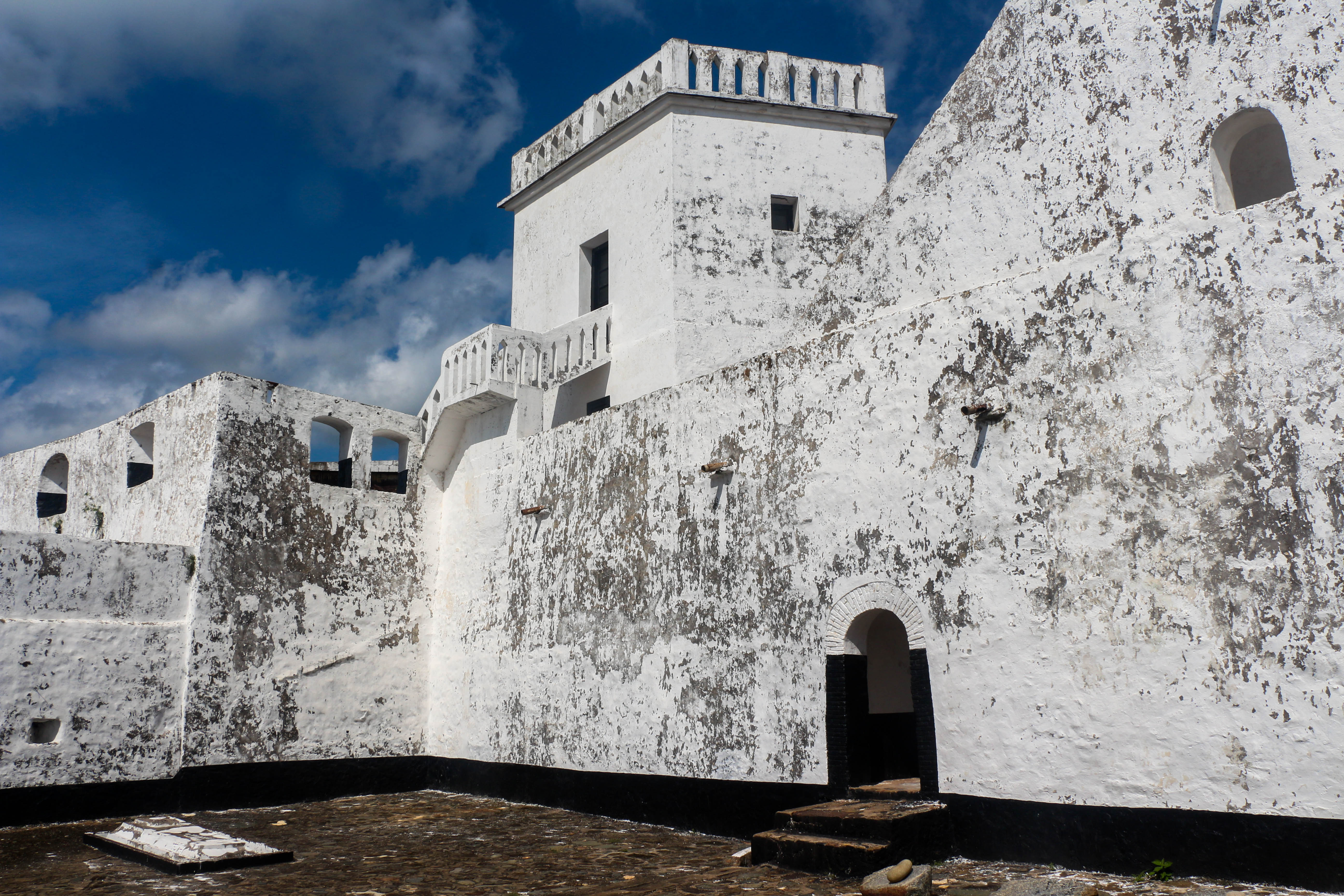
Fort Saint Anthony at Axim, Ghana

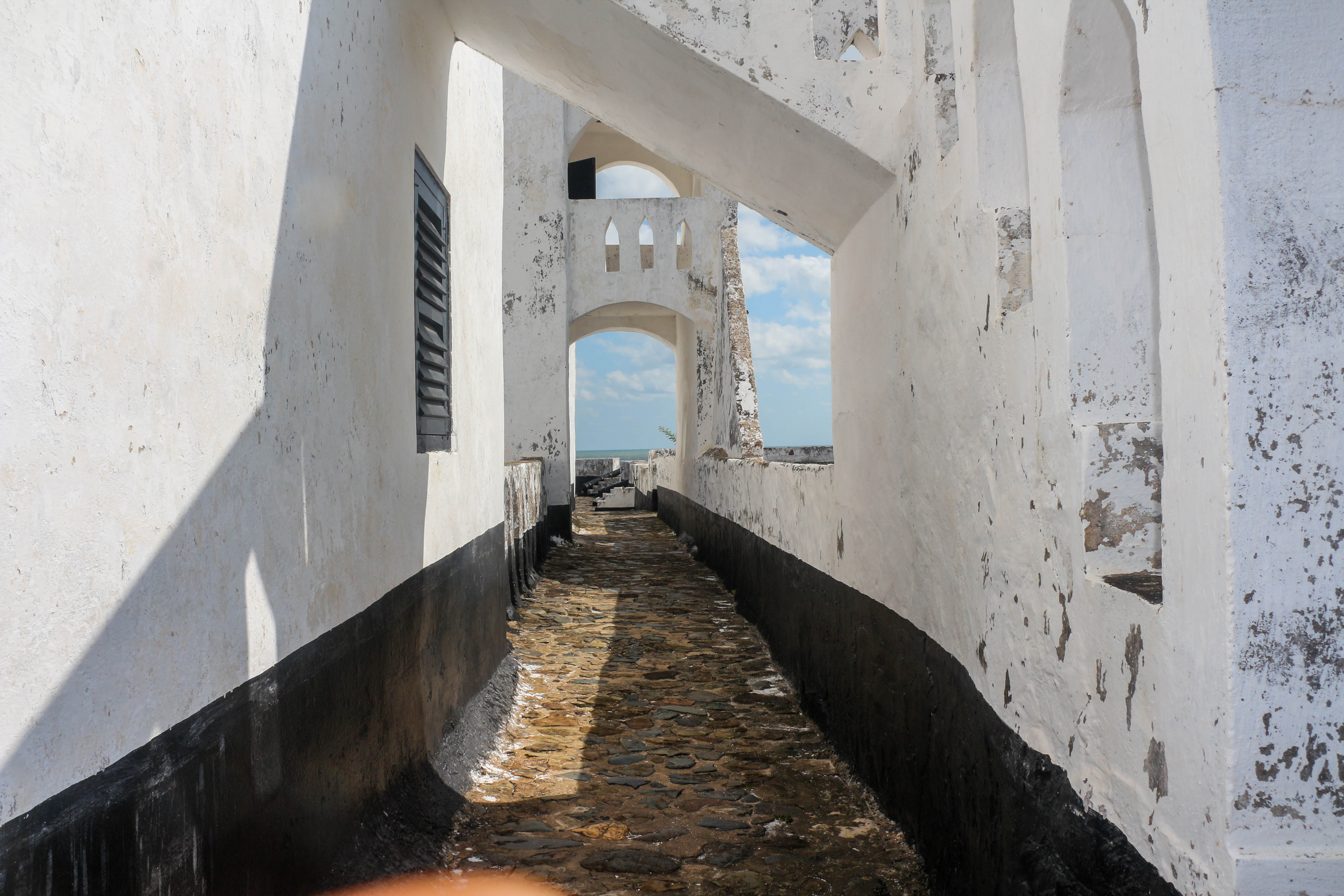
Fort Saint Anthony at Axim, Ghana

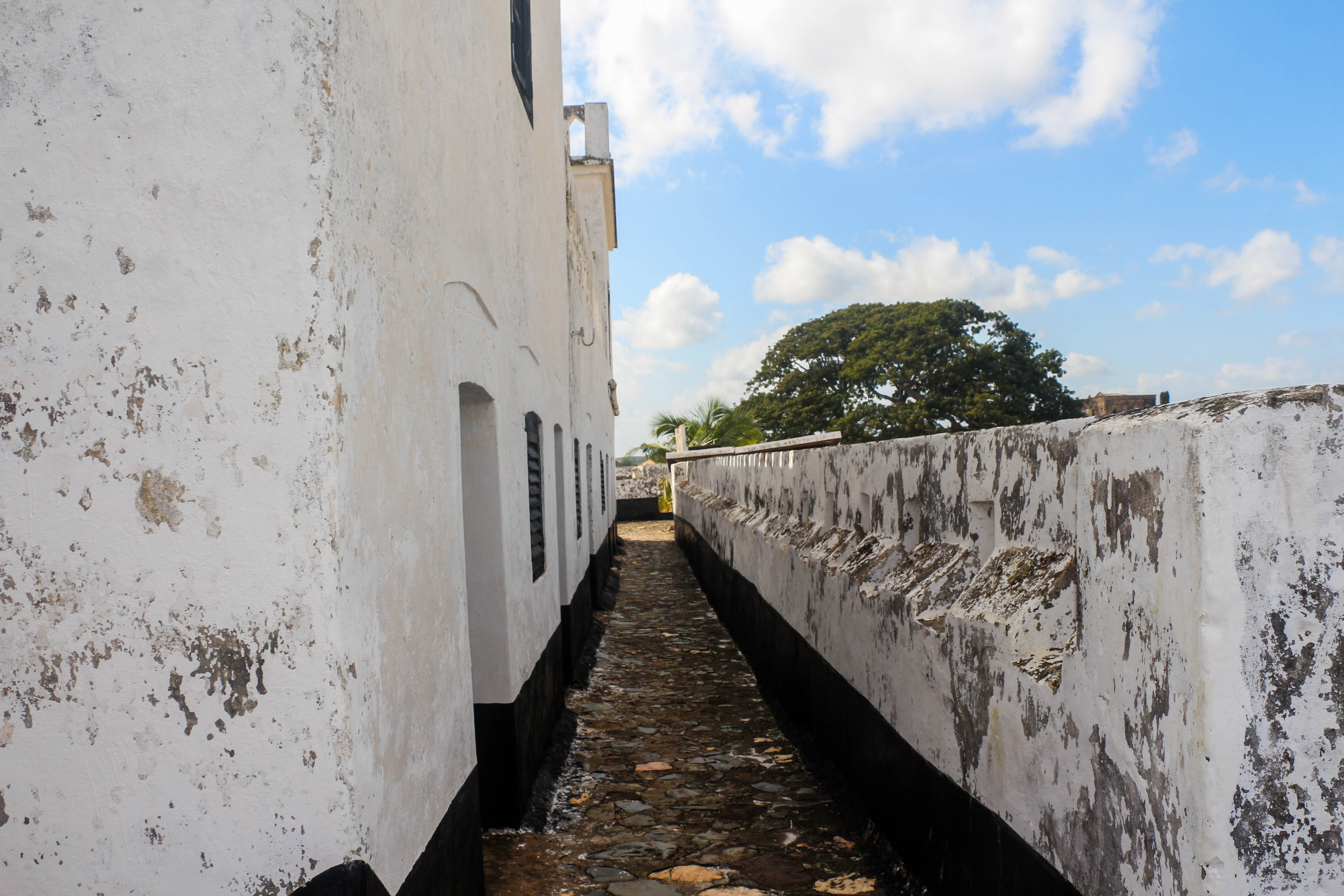
Fort Saint Anthony at Axim, Ghana

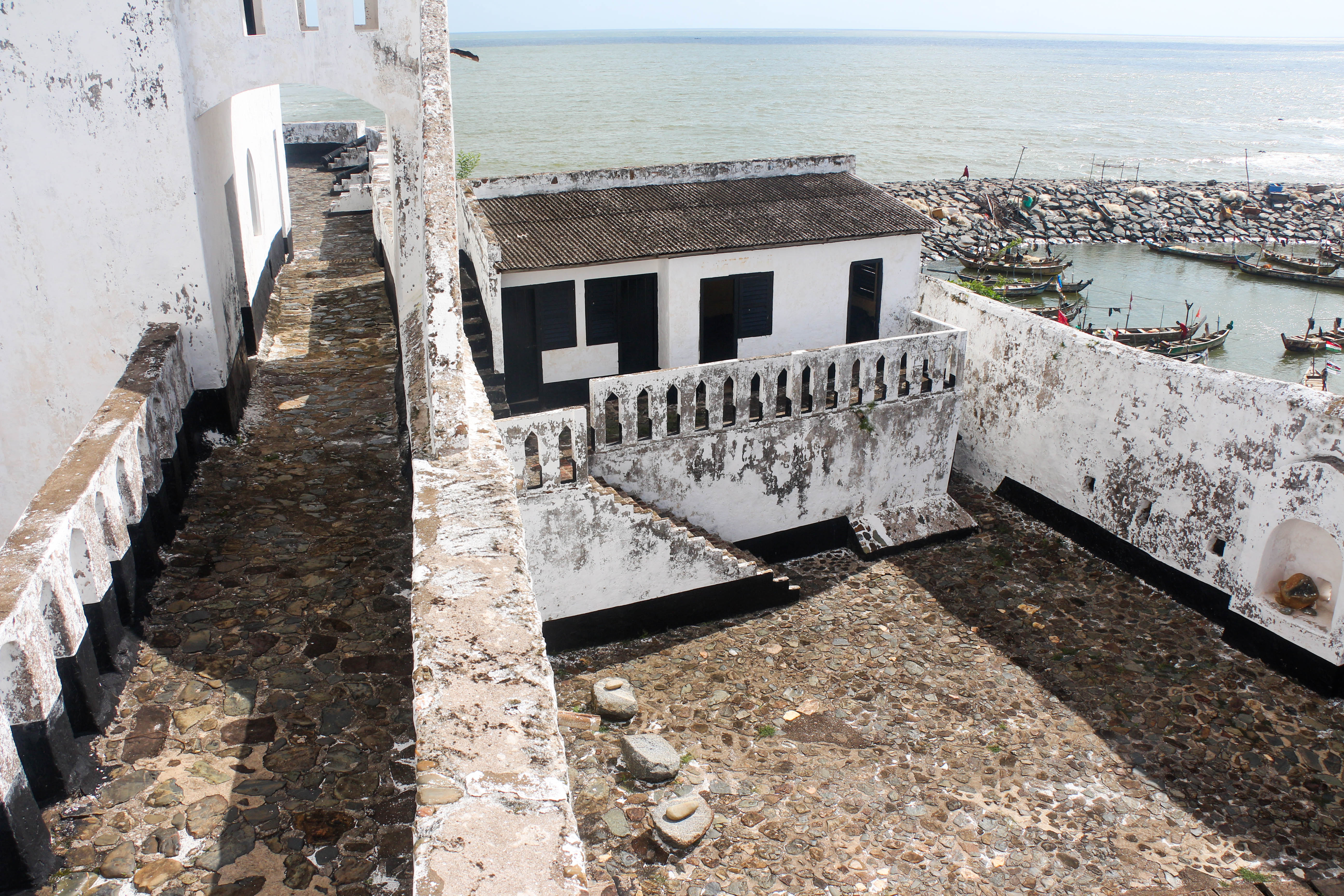
Fort Saint Anthony at Axim, Ghana

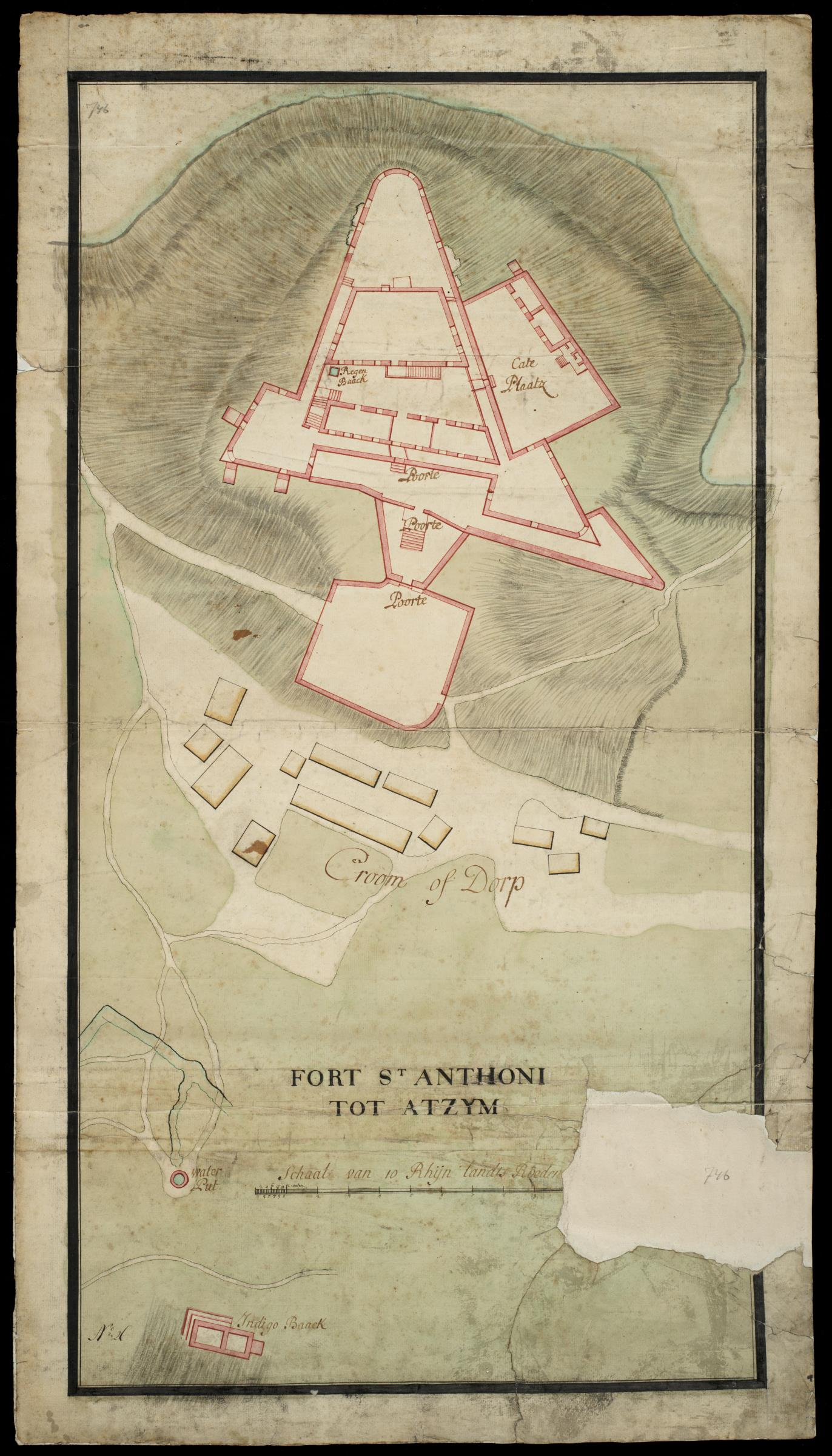
Floor plan of Fort Saint Anthony from the 18th century.

Map of the District of Axim drawn by Julius Vitringa Coulon in 1859.

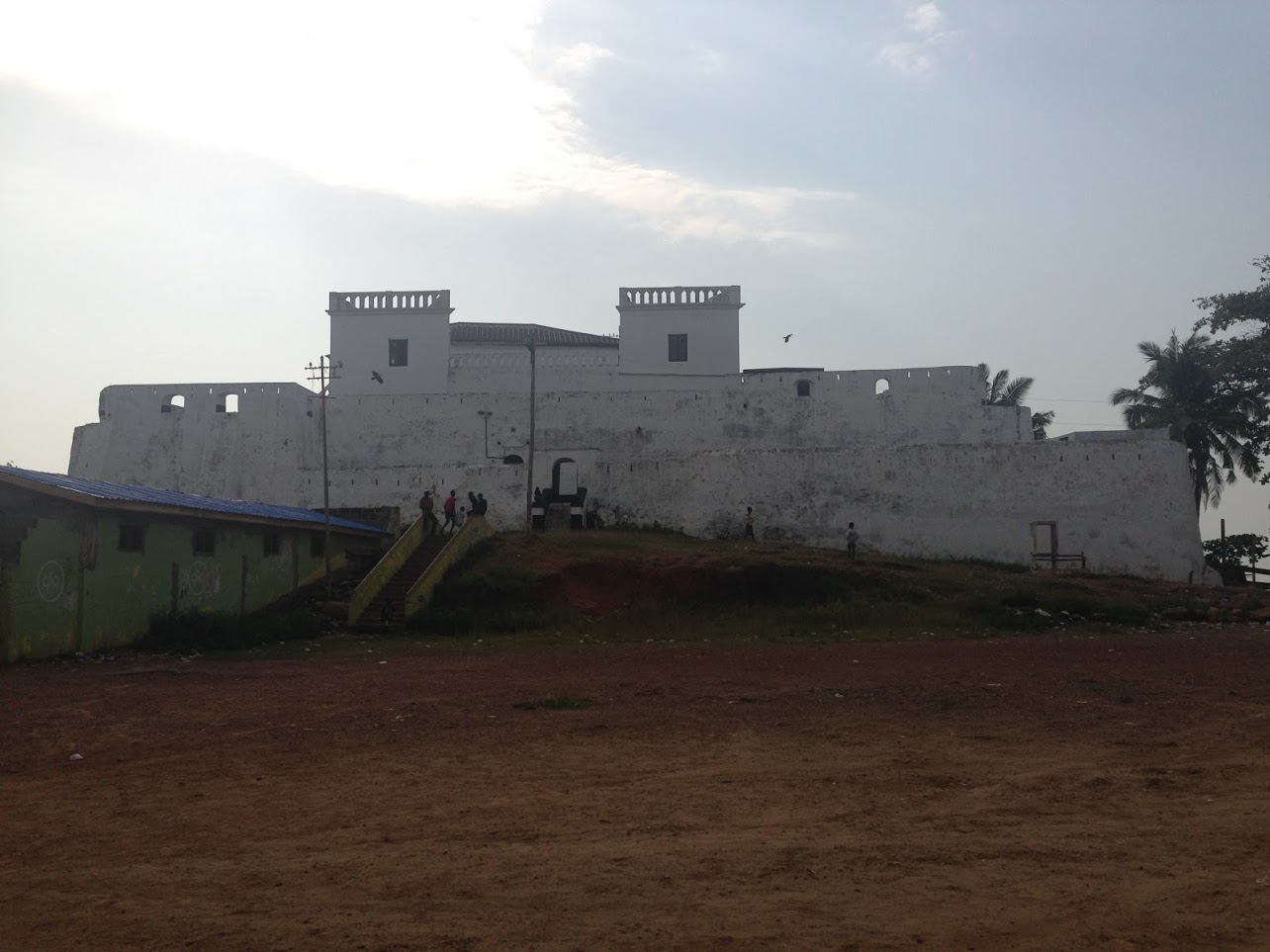
