= Ejan, Ghana =

Ejan
- Town
- Location in Ghana
- Coordinates: 4°49′52″N 2°12′06″W
- Country: Ghana
- District: Jomoro District
- Elevation: 1 m (3.3 ft)

Population (2013)
  - Total: very small
- Time zone: UTC0 (GMT)
  - Summer (DST): GMT
- Area code: +233 (0) 31 3 plus 6 digit number

Ejan, or Agyan, is a town in the Western Region of Ghana. The town is southeast of Domunli on the Atlantic coast of Ghana. It is located 100 kilometres (62 mi) west of the regional capital, Takoradi, and is in the Jomoro District. Other towns that surround Ejan are Domunli, Domun, Agufo, and Dentokrom.
