= Domunli Gas Processing Project =

Domunli Gas Processing Project is the company that oversees the activities of gas processing in Domunli in the Western Region of Ghana. It is a Government of Ghana company under the Ministry of Energy of Ghana. The project is to enable natural gas to flow from the Jubilee oil field to generate 500 megawatts of electricity.
