= Apewosika (Western Region) =

Community in Western Region, Ghana

- Town
- Country: Ghana
- Region: Western Region
- District: Nzema East Municipality

Population
  - Total: —
- Time zone: GMT
  - Summer (DST): GMT

Apewosika is a community in the Nzema East Municipality in the Western Region of Ghana.

== Facility ==
There is a fish cold storage facility located in the community of Apewosika.
