= Domun, Khyber Pakhtunkhwa =

Domun
- Location within Pakistan
- Coordinates: 35°44′42″N 71°47′56″E
- Country: Pakistan
- Province: Khyber-Pakhtunkhwa
- Elevation: 1,901 m (6,237 ft)
- Time zone: UTC+5 (PST)

Domun is a village in Khyber-Pakhtunkhwa. It is located at 35°44'42N 71°47'56E with an altitude of 1901 metres (6240 feet).
