= Ejan Mackaay =

Canadian emeritus professor of law and author

Ejan Mackaay was born 1943 in Amsterdam. He was professor of law at the Université de Montréal from 1972 till 2009, and remains emeritus professor of law.

== Career ==
Ejan Mackaay obtained an LL.M from the University of Amsterdam in 1966 and an LL.M from the University of Toronto in 1977, with Michael Trebilcock as thesis adviser. He obtained his LL.D. at the University of Amsterdam in 1980 codirected by Arnold Heertje and Hans Franken on a thesis titled: "Economics of information and law". Mackaay became professor of law at the Université de Montréal in 1972. He retired in 2009 and since then, as emeritus professor of law, retaining some teaching and research activity.

He specialises in Economic Analysis of Law and intellectual property. Over the years, Mackaay has been involved in a variety of organisations and institutions, including as Fellow at CIRANO since 2010, as director of the Centre for the Law of Business and International Trade (CDACI) (2005–2008) and as director of the Public Law Research Centre (CRDP) (1999–2003), at the Université de Montréal.

In 1986, he was elected a corresponding member of the Royal Netherlands Academy of Arts and Sciences. In 1996, he was awarded the Minerva Prize of the Netherlands Society of Translators for the translation of the Netherlands Civil Code into French. In 2013, he won the Vogel Book Prize for his work Law and Economics for Civil Law Systems. On 13 November 2018, the Aix-Marseille University awarded him an honorary doctorate in law.

His research has always aimed at making the law more easily accessible, by focusing on the intersection of law and neighbouring sciences, including information technology and social sciences ("jurimetrics", Law and economics).

== Publications ==
=== Books ===
- Mackaay, Ejan; Rousseau, Stéphane; Larouche, Pierre; Parent, Alain (2021). Analyse économique du droit (3rd ed.). Paris/Montréal: Dalloz/Éditions Thémis. ISBN 978-2-247-16221-5.
- Mackaay, Ejan (2021). Law and Economics for Civil Law Systems (2nd ed.). Cheltenham: Edward Elgar. ISBN 978-1-78811-825-5.
- Rousseau, Stéphane; Mackaay, Ejan; Larouche, Pierre; Parent, Alain (2021). Business Law and Economics for Civil Law Systems (1st ed.). Cheltenham: Edward Elgar. ISBN 978-1-78811-827-9.
- Mackaay, Ejan (2013). Law and Economics for Civil Law Systems (1st ed.). Cheltenham: Edward Elgar. ISBN 978-1-84844-309-9. Archived from the original on 5 May 2014.
- Mackaay, Ejan; Rousseau, Stéphane (2008). Analyse économique du droit, 2nd ed (in French) (2nd ed.). Paris: Dalloz. ISBN 978-2-247-07145-6. Archived from the original on 30 April 2010.
- Ejan, Mackaay, ed. (2000). Les certitudes du droit [Certainties of the Law] (in French). Montréal: Éditions Thémis.
- P.P.C. Haanappel; Ejan Mackaay (1995). New Netherlands Civil Code – Patrimonial Law / Le nouveau Code civil néerlandais (trilingual edition English – French – Dutch). Vol. Book 8 – Traffic Means and Transport/ Livre huitième – Du transport et des moyens de transport. The Hague: Kluwer Law International. ISBN 90-41101292.
- Mackaay, Ejan; Trudeau, Hélène, eds. (1995). L'environnement – À quel prix? [The Environment – At What Cost?] (in French). Montréal: Éditions Thémis. ISBN 2-89400-063-4.
- Mackaay, Ejan; Poulin, Daniel; Trudel, Pierre, eds. (1995). The electronic superhighway – The shape of technology and law to come. Computer/Law Series. The Hague: Kluwer Law International.
- Poulin, Daniel; Trudel, Pierre; Mackaay, Ejan, eds. (1995). Les autoroutes électroniques – Usages, droit et promesses [The Electronic Superhighway – Uses, law and promises] (in French). Cowansville: Les Éditions Yvon Blais.
- Mackaay, Ejan; Gendreau, Ysolde, eds. (1993). Législation canadienne en propriété intellectuelle [Canadian Legislation on Intellectual Property] (in English and French). Scarborough, Ontario: Carswell.
- Mackaay, Ejan, ed. (1991). Nouvelles technologies et propriété (in French). Montréal: Éditions Thémis.
- P.P.C. Haanappel; E. Mackaay (1997). New Netherlands Civil Code – Patrimonial Law / Le nouveau Code civil néerlandais – Le droit patrimonial (trilingual English – French – Dutch ed.). The Hague: Kluwer Law International. ISBN 90-6544-482-3.
- Deniger, Constant; Mackaay, Ejan; Turcotte, Denis (1989). Les contrats en télématique – Guide pratique pour diffuser une banque d'informations (in French). Les publications du Québec.
- Codification, Valeurs et Langage, Actes du colloque international de droit civil comparé (in French). Service des communications du Conseil de la langue française. 1986. Archived from the original on 8 April 2009. (member of the Organising Committee of the Conference, which took place on 1–3 October 1981)
- Paul A. Crépeau; et al. (1985). Dictionnaire de droit privé (in French) (1st ed.). Centre de recherche en droit privé et comparé du Québec.
- Economics of Information and Law. Boston: Kluwer–Nijhoff. 1982.

=== Other publications ===
Several publications of Ejan Mackaay can be found on these websites:

- http://en.scientificcommons.org/ejan_mackaay
- https://depot.erudit.org/items-by-author?author=Mackaay%2C+Ejan
- https://openlibrary.org/b/OL9006747M
- https://hq.ssrn.com/submissions/MyPapers.cfm?partid=20688
- https://papyrus.bib.umontreal.ca/xmlui/discover?query=Ejan+Mackaay&submit=Aller
- https://www.researchgate.net/profile/Ejan-Mackaay/research
