= Nsein =

Town in Western Region of Ghana

Coordinates: 4°53′N 2°13′W

Nsein is a town in the Western Region of Ghana. The town host the Nsein Senior High School and the operations of Ghana National Gas Corporation.
