= Eikwe =

- Town
- Location within Ghana
- Coordinates: 4°58′00″N 2°28′47″W
- Country: Ghana
- Region: Western Region
- District: Ellembele
- Elevation: 49 ft (15 m)
- Time zone: GMT
  - Summer (DST): GMT

Eikwe is a small town in the Ellembelle District of the Western Region of Ghana.

Eikwe is popularly known amongst the Nzema folks of Ghana for the prominent hospital facility that serve the populace of all the 3 districts in Nzemaland.

The hospital which is one of the biggest in the 3 districts is a CHAG hospital called St. Martin's de porress hospital.

There are other smaller towns near Eikwe, such as Baku (also known as Beku) where the luxury resort Venice View Beach Resort is located. These small towns are known for fishing activities and they are gradually becoming vacation destinations because of their calm and beautiful beaches interspersed with very tall coconut trees.

Eikwe is also known to be one of the fishing communities in Nzemaland with fishing being the primary work of the indigenes.

It is located after Sanzule-Krisan and is a branch road off the Esiama-Elubo road. On that stretch, the branch to Eikwe, is at Alabokazo.
