= Essiama =

Esiama
- Town
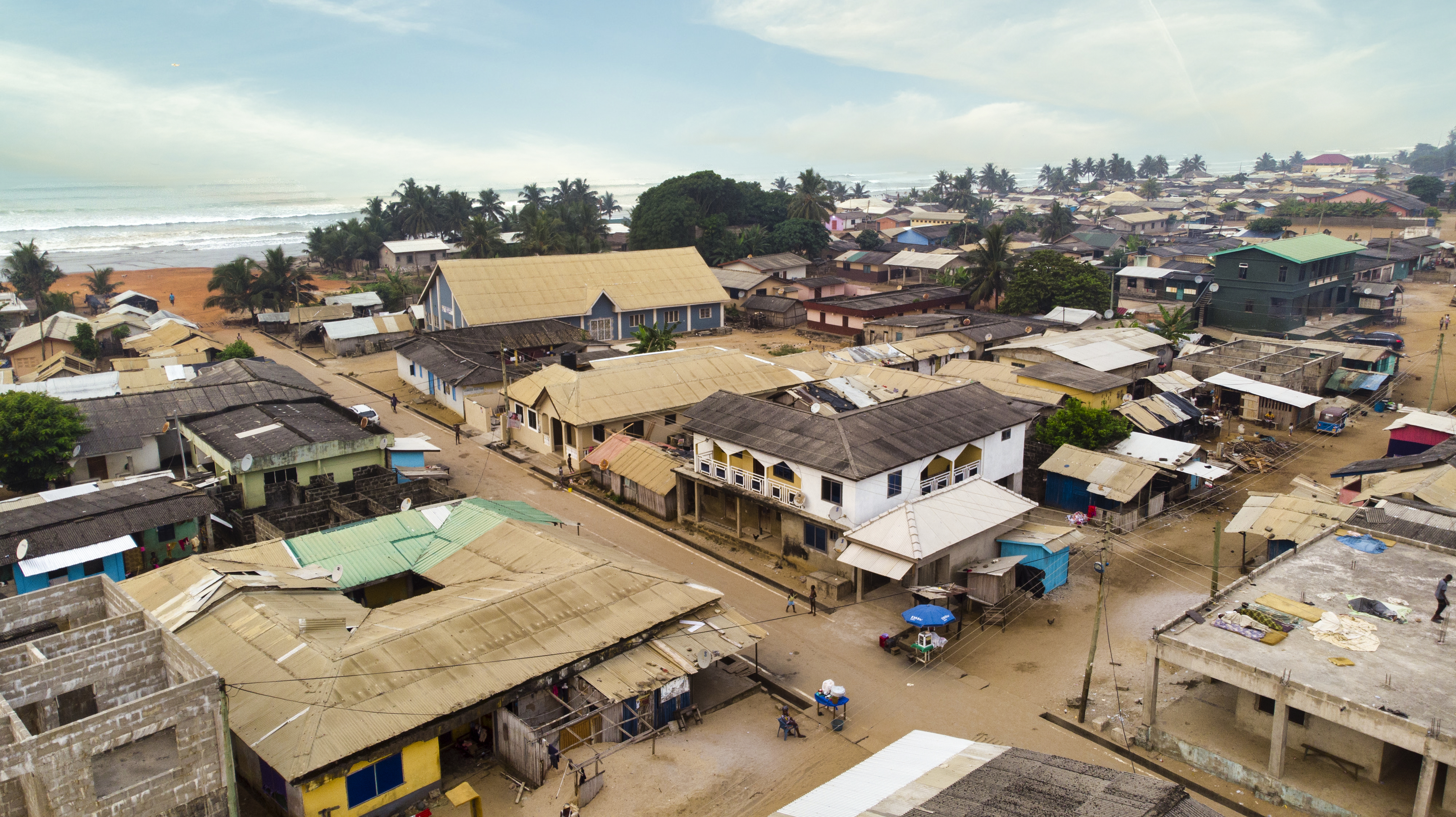

- Location in Ghana
- Coordinates: 4°55′58″N 2°20′49″W
- Country: Ghana
- Region: Western Region (Ghana)
- District: Nzema East Municipal
- Elevation: 18 m (59 ft)
- Time zone: GMT
  - Summer (DST): GMT
- Website: https://esiama.com

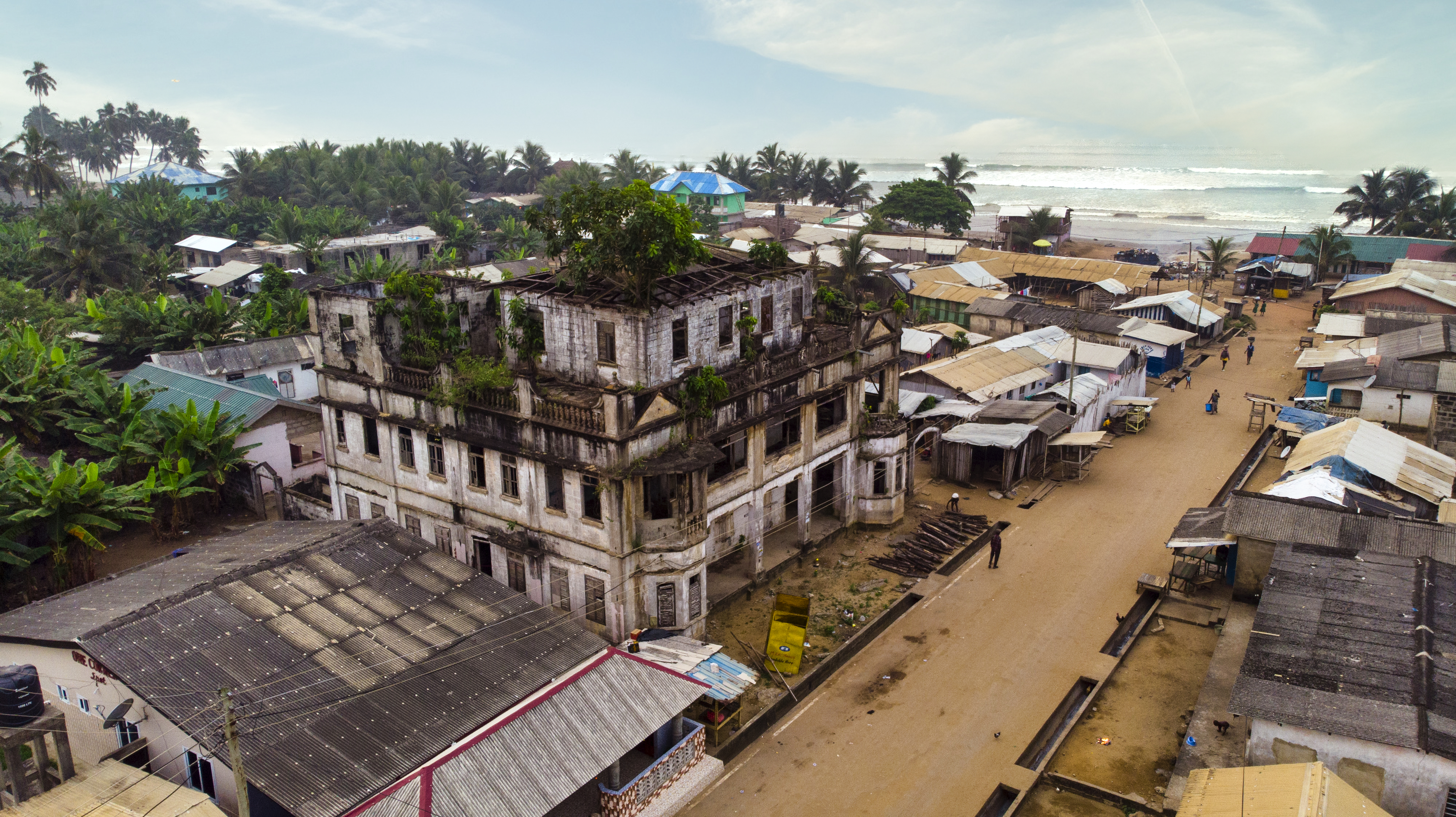
One of the oldest colonial buildings on the Nzema coasts still stands today in Esiama.

Esiama (/ɛˈziːməə/) is a major principal town in the Nzema East Municipal District, in the Ellembelle District, Western Ghana.

== History ==
Recorded history of Esiama predates colonialism of the Gold Coast, as far back as 1256.

== Tourism ==
Esiama is known to reserve some the most beautiful beaches in Ghana which serves as a means of livelihood for the local community through fishing, and a source of entertainment for visiting tourists.
