= Half Assini =

Half Assini Awiane Nzema
- Municipality Capital
- Location in Ghana
- Coordinates: 5°03′N 2°53′W
- Country: Ghana
- Region: Western Region
- District: Jomoro District
- Elevation: 30 ft (9 m)
- Time zone: GMT
  - Summer (DST): GMT

Half Assini, also known as Awiane, is a small town and is the capital of Jomoro Municipal District, a municipality in the Western Region of Ghana. It is the hometown of Kwame Nkrumah's father. Nkrumah, the first president of Ghana, had attended elementary school at Half Assini. The town is closer to the western border of Ghana, has white sand beaches and is known for its numerous tourist sites. One of Half Assini's chiefs, Anthony Kwaw, was best friends with Ghana's first president in school.

The British cargo ship SS Bakana ran aground at the shores of Half Assini on August 27, 1913 and the debris still remains there until this day. The captain of the vessel, Capt. Williams, who died in the town, has his tomb situated in the middle of Capt. Williams Street which is named in his honour.

The Kundun festival, also known as Abissa among the Nzema’s is celebrated annually by the chiefs and people of Half Assini mostly in October to thank the god’s for a good harvest. The chiefs and people also celebrate the SO SO DOH festival in every last week of December to thank the Almighty God for his protection and mercies within the year and to usher in the next year.

The Half Assini Senior High School located within the town serves students from across the length and breadth of the country.

The only Government Hospital in the town serves people from within the town and its environs including patients from the neighbouring border towns of Ivory Coast.

== See also ==
- Half Assini - New Town Rd.
