= Ghana National Gas Company =

Government of Ghana agency

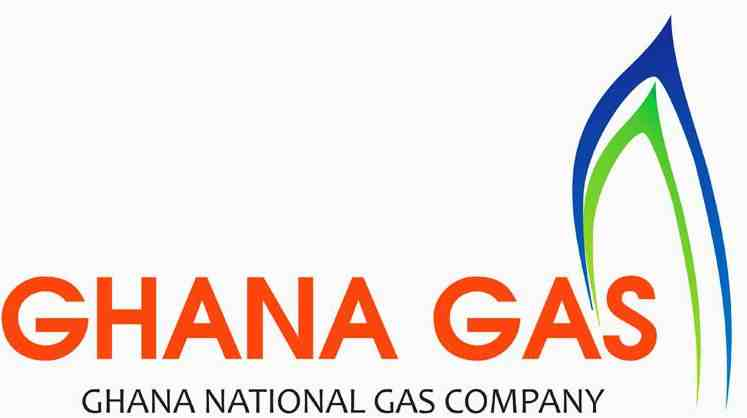

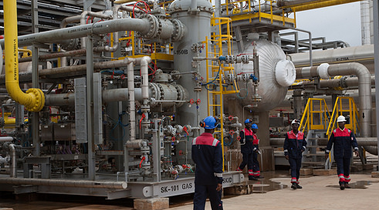
- Atuabo Gas Plant of the Ghana National Gas Company located at Atuabo in the Western Region of Ghana.
- Industry: Natural Gas
- Founded: July 2011
- Headquarters: Accra, Greater Accra, Ghana
- Key people: Gerald Kofi Totobi Quakyi Board Chairman; Miss Judith Adjoba Blay Chief executive officer
- Owner: Government of Ghana
- Website: www.ghanagas.com.gh

Ghana National Gas Company is a state agency that operates infrastructure required for the gathering, processing, transporting and marketing of natural gas resources in Ghana.

Ghana Gas operates on a business model, generating revenue through the processing, transportation, and sale of natural gas and natural gas liquids. Currently, GNGC supplies gas to the Volta River Authority (VRA) for power generation.

== History ==
The company was incorporated in July 2011 by the Government of Ghana.

Official production commenced in November 2014. The company specializes in the production and exploration of lean gas, condensate, LPG, and isopentanes, while also playing a vital role in driving the growth of the nation’s industrial sector.

== See also ==
- Atuabo
- Atuabo Gas Plant
