= Nzema East Municipal District =

- Municipal District
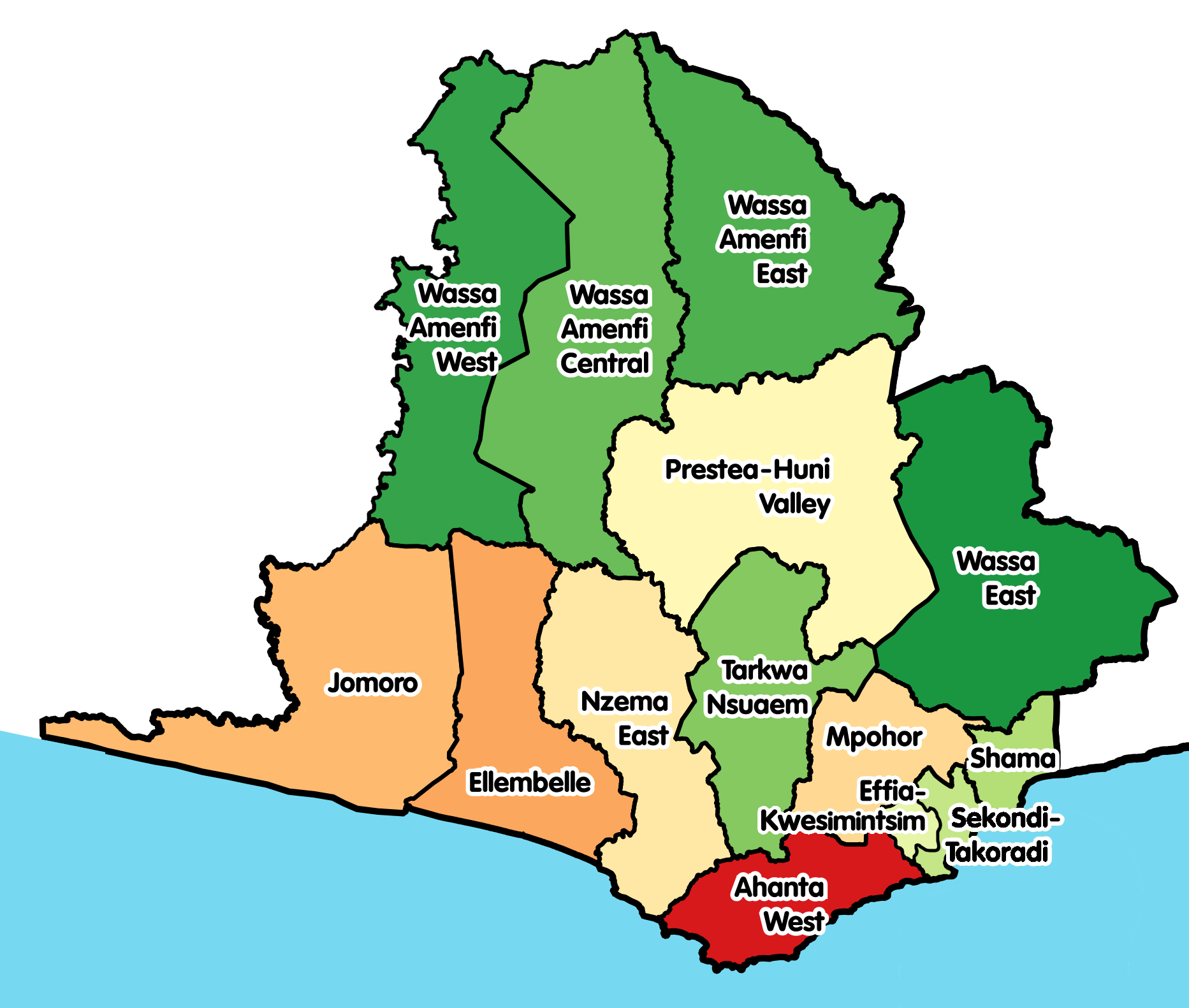
- Districts of Western Region

- Location of Nzema East Municipal District within Western
- Coordinates: 4°52′2″N 2°14′27″W
- Country: Ghana
- Region: Western
- Capital: Axim

Government
  - Municipal Chief Executive: Hon. James Ackah Kobbina
  - Succeeded: Hon. Joshua Kwagya Ellimah

Population (2021)
  - Total: 94,621
- Time zone: UTC+0 (GMT)
- ISO 3166 code: GH-WP-NE

Nzema East Municipal District is one of the fourteen districts in Western Region, Ghana. It was originally created as a district assembly in 1988 when it was known as Nzema East District, which was created from the former Nzema District Council, until the western part of the district was split off by a decree of then-president John Agyekum Kufuor on 29 February 2008 to create Ellembelle District; thus the remaining part has been retained as Nzema East District, which was later elevated to municipal district assembly status on the same year to become Nzema East Municipal District. The municipality is located in the southwest part of Western Region and has Axim as its capital town.

== List of settlements ==
Settlements of Nzema East Municipal District
No.	Settlement	Population	Population year
1	Akyinim		
2	Brawire		
3	Anto Brawire		
4	Amanfukuman		
5	Soloh		
6	James Town		
7	Boatase		
8	Anto		
9	Apewosika		
10	Nkekeim		
11	Agyan		
12	Domunil		
11	Akonu		

== Sources ==
- "Districts of Ghana". Statoids.
- GhanaDistricts.com
