= Axim =

Coastal town in Western Region of Ghana

Axim Bolɔfo (Bolorfo)
- Town
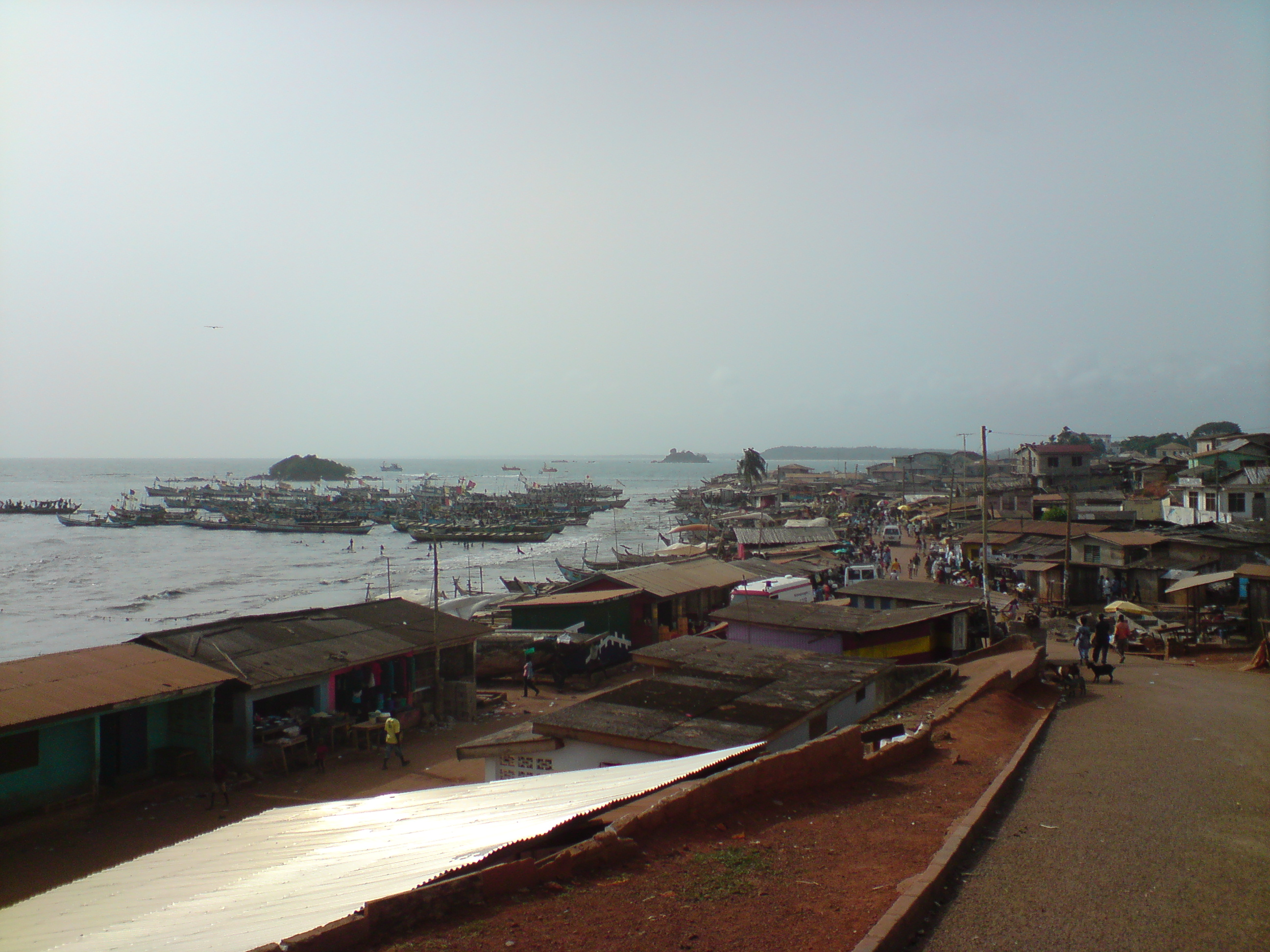

- Nzema East Municipal District logo

- Location of Axim in Western Region, South Ghana
- Coordinates: 4°52′N 2°14′W
- Country: Ghana
- Region: Western Region
- District: Nzema East Municipal

Population (2013)
  - Total: 27,719

Language
  - Language: Nzema
- Time zone: GMT
  - Summer (DST): GMT

Axim is a coastal town and the capital of Nzema East Municipal district, a district in Western Region of South Ghana. Axim lies 64 kilometers west of the port city of Sekondi-Takoradi in the Western Region, west of Cape Three Points. Axim has a 2013 settlement population of 27,719 people.

== History ==
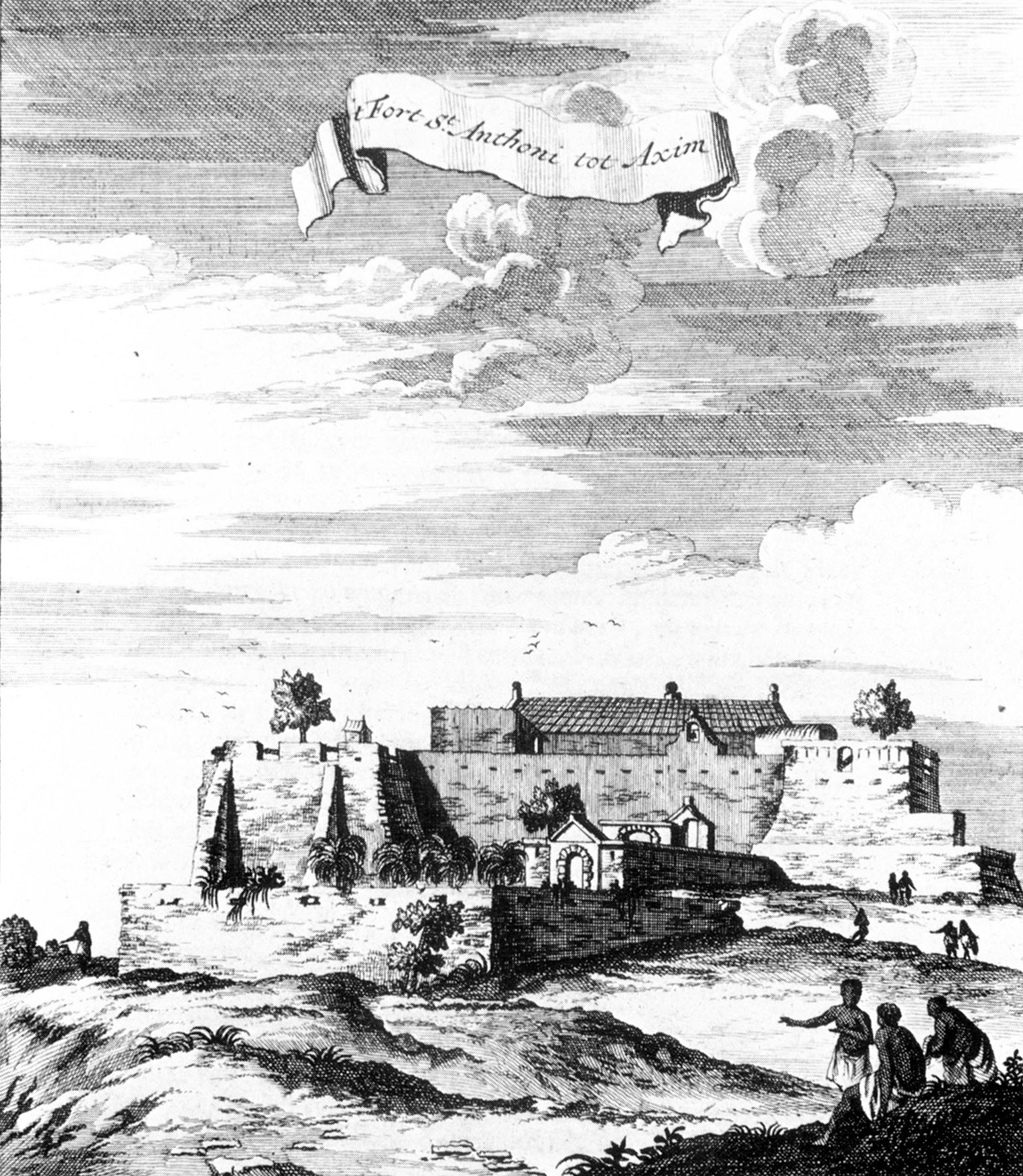
Fort St. Anthony at Axim, 1709. Lithograph.

This area was occupied by the Nzema people.

The Portuguese arrived by the early 16th century as traders. They built a prominent seaside fort, Fort Santo Antonio, in 1515. They exported some Africans as slaves to Europe and the Americas. Between 1642 and 1872, the fort was expanded and altered by the Dutch, who "ruled" during that period. The fort, now property of Ghana, is open to the public. Off-shore are some picturesque islands, including one with a lighthouse.

== Axim structure ==
The town of Axim is divided into two parts: Upper Axim and Lower Axim. Fort Santo Antonio lies roughly on the division between the two parts, but closest to the centre of Upper Axim, the original European settlement. Here, several large mansions of lumber-trading magnates and other businessmen remain from the late 19th century and period of the British empire. Axim is governed by a political District Executive of the Nzema East Municipality.

== Economy ==
The economy is based mainly on Axim's fishing fleet, but the area also has three tourist beach resorts as well as coconut and rubber plantations. The scenic and fertile terrain features many palm trees. Local artisanal miners pan for gold in streams inland from Axim.

Axim has a transport station, two major bank branches, and some rural banks including the Ahantaman Rural Bank, Nzema Maanle Rural Bank, Lower Pra Rural Bank.

== Culture ==
Every August, the major festivals of Kundum takes place, coinciding with the best fishing-catch of the year; people come to Axim for the festivities and to fish and trade.

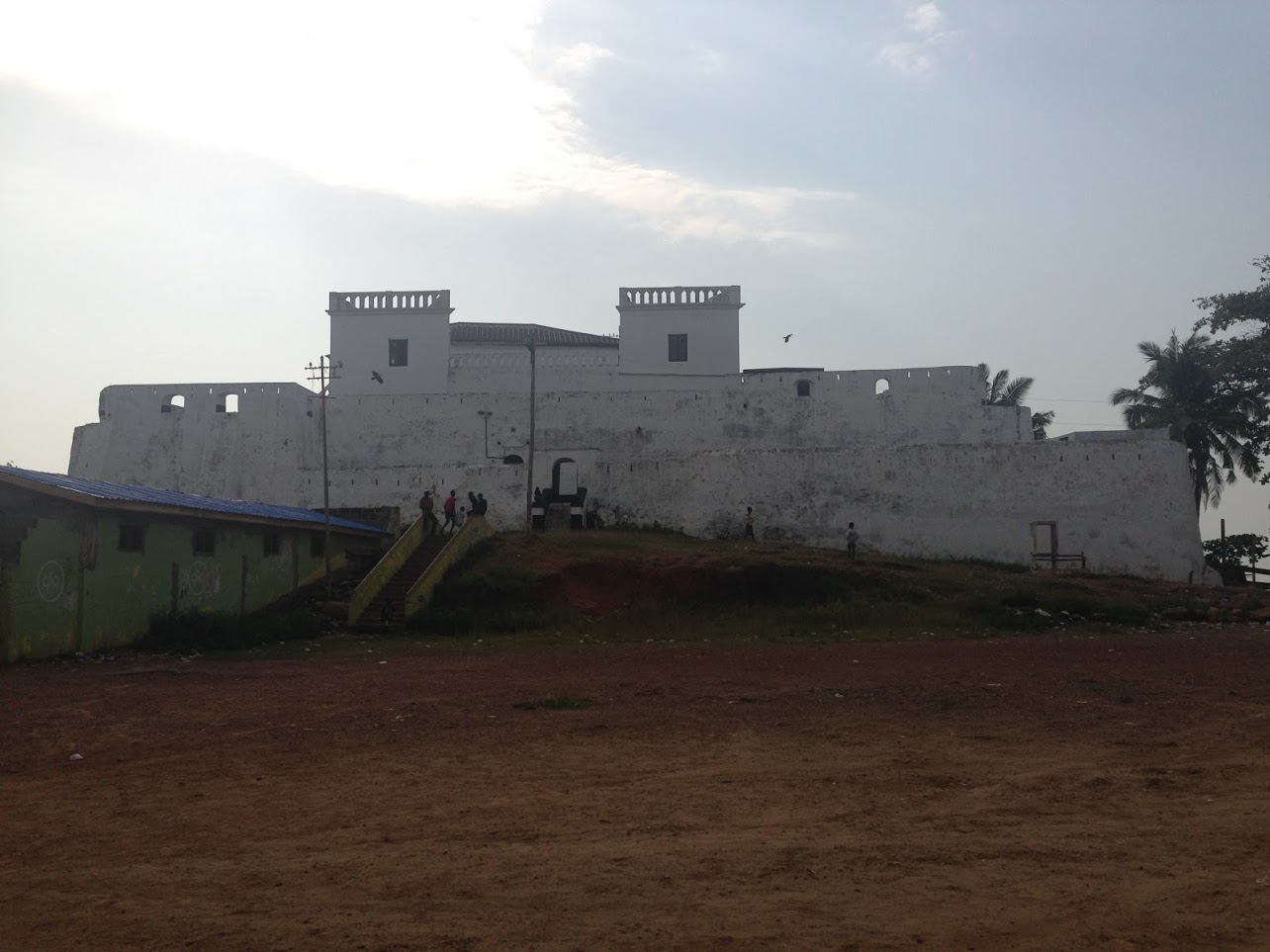
Fort Saint Anthony, Axim

== Climate ==
Axim has a tropical monsoon climate (Köppen Am) with hot and humid weather year-round. There are two dry seasons in January-February and August-September — the latter due to the northern extension of the cold, foggy Beneguela Current — but some rainfall is seen even in these periods. May and June are the wettest months with rainfall typically over 300 millimetres or 12 inches in May and over 450 millimetres or 18 inches in June.

Climate data for Axim (1991–2020)
| Month | Jan | Feb | Mar | Apr | May | Jun | Jul | Aug | Sep | Oct | Nov | Dec | Year |
|---|---|---|---|---|---|---|---|---|---|---|---|---|---|
| Record high °C (°F) | 35.3 (95.5) | 33.9 (93.0) | 35.2 (95.4) | 34.4 (93.9) | 35.0 (95.0) | 32.5 (90.5) | 30.5 (86.9) | 29.5 (85.1) | 31.0 (87.8) | 32.4 (90.3) | 34.0 (93.2) | 33.6 (92.5) | 35.3 (95.5) |
| Mean daily maximum °C (°F) | 30.5 (86.9) | 31.2 (88.2) | 31.5 (88.7) | 31.4 (88.5) | 30.6 (87.1) | 28.8 (83.8) | 27.7 (81.9) | 27.1 (80.8) | 27.7 (81.9) | 29.0 (84.2) | 30.6 (87.1) | 30.9 (87.6) | 29.8 (85.6) |
| Daily mean °C (°F) | 27.3 (81.1) | 28.3 (82.9) | 28.3 (82.9) | 28.2 (82.8) | 27.5 (81.5) | 26.5 (79.7) | 25.8 (78.4) | 25.2 (77.4) | 25.7 (78.3) | 26.6 (79.9) | 27.3 (81.1) | 27.6 (81.7) | 27.0 (80.6) |
| Mean daily minimum °C (°F) | 24.0 (75.2) | 25.4 (77.7) | 25.2 (77.4) | 24.9 (76.8) | 24.5 (76.1) | 24.1 (75.4) | 23.8 (74.8) | 23.3 (73.9) | 23.8 (74.8) | 24.1 (75.4) | 23.9 (75.0) | 24.2 (75.6) | 24.3 (75.7) |
| Record low °C (°F) | 16.6 (61.9) | 19.8 (67.6) | 19.4 (66.9) | 19.9 (67.8) | 20.0 (68.0) | 20.5 (68.9) | 20.4 (68.7) | 20.2 (68.4) | 20.0 (68.0) | 20.2 (68.4) | 19.8 (67.6) | 18.8 (65.8) | 16.6 (61.9) |
| Average rainfall mm (inches) | 42.3 (1.67) | 48.3 (1.90) | 92.9 (3.66) | 160.6 (6.32) | 303.7 (11.96) | 491.8 (19.36) | 178.2 (7.02) | 57.5 (2.26) | 72.9 (2.87) | 223.6 (8.80) | 158.7 (6.25) | 78.4 (3.09) | 1,908.9 (75.15) |
| Average rainy days (≥ 1.0 mm) | 3.0 | 4.3 | 6.3 | 9.9 | 15.1 | 16.8 | 10.3 | 7.9 | 9.4 | 13.4 | 11.0 | 6.4 | 113.8 |
| Mean monthly sunshine hours | 189.7 | 189.3 | 211.5 | 216.1 | 189.4 | 118.7 | 137.5 | 121.2 | 117.4 | 184.9 | 218.8 | 209.9 | 2,104.4 |
Source: NOAA

== Notable locals ==
- January Conny, known by many names, of which the best-known is John Canoe, was an Akan warrior and chief of the Ahanta people, an ally of Brandenburg-Prussia against the British and the Dutch, in the Brandenburger Gold Coast colony (1683–1720) in Axim. His true name has been lost to history, although the name Kenu is an authentic Akan name.
- Anton Wilhelm Amo (1703–1756), the first black African to receive a philosophical education in Europe and to publish philosophical works there and in Germany. He published "The Rights of Moors" (among other works) and taught philosophy at the University of Jena.

== See also ==
- Treaty of Axim (1642)
