= Jomoro Municipal District =

Municipal district in Western region, Ghana

- Municipal District
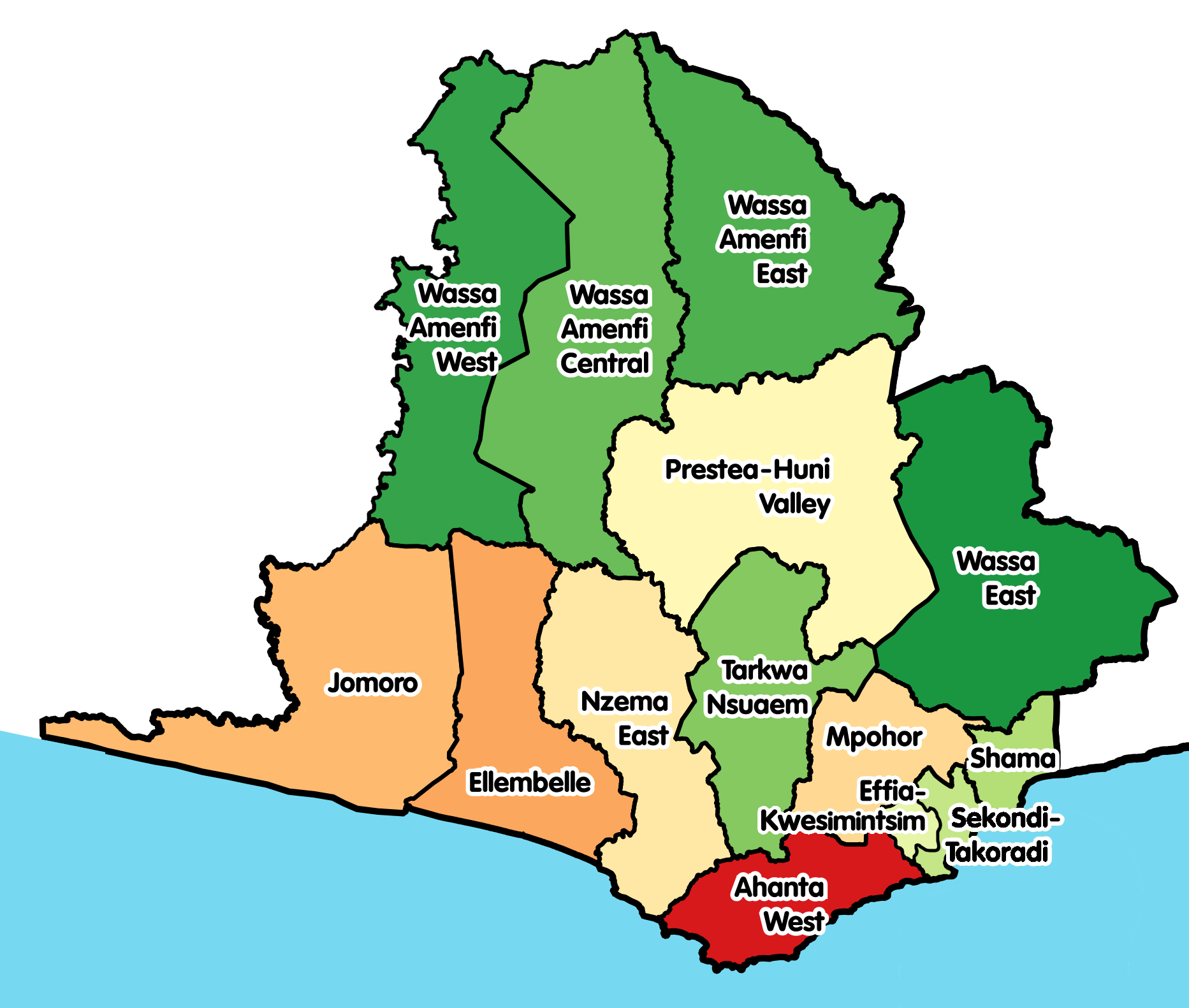
- Districts of Western Region

- Location of Jomoro Municipal District within Western
- Coordinates: 5°5′35″N 3°6′5″W
- Country: Ghana
- Region: Western
- Capital: Half Assini

Government
  - Municipal Chief Executive: Benedict Boadi

Area
  - Total: 1,344 km^{2} (519 sq mi)

Population (2021 census)
  - Total: 126,576
  - Density: 94.18/km^{2} (243.9/sq mi)
- Time zone: UTC+0 (GMT)
- ISO 3166 code: GH-WP-JO

Jomoro Municipal District (a.k.a. Nzema West Municipal District) is one of the fourteen districts in Western Region, Ghana. Originally created as an ordinary district assembly in 1988 when it was known as Jomoro District, which was created from the former Nzema District Council, until it was later elevated to municipal district assembly status on 15 March 2018 to become Jomoro Municipal District. The municipality is located in the southwest part of Western Region and has Half Assini as its capital town.

== Geography ==
Jomoro Municipal District is the most westernmost district on the coast of Ghana.

== Sources ==
- Jomoro District Official Website
- "Districts of Ghana". Statoids.
- GhanaDistricts.com
