= Fetu Kingdom =

Former Guan-Akan kingdom on the Gold Coast

Kingdom of Fetu Effutu (Fetu)
- 15th century–18th century
- Status: Former kingdom
- Capital: Effutu
- Common languages: Effutu language Akan language
- Religion: Akan religion
- Government: Monarchy
- Ohene (King)
  - fl. 1550s: Dom João of Fetu
  - d. 1646: Ohene (name unknown)
  - fl. 1660s: Aduaffo
- History
  - Emergence as coastal polity: 15th century
  - Absorbed into Fante Confederacy: 18th century
- Currency: Gold dust Cowrie shells Barter
Succeeded by
Fante Confederacy
- Today part of: Ghana

The Kingdom of Fetu (also spelled Effutu or Afutu) was a Guan-Akan state located along the central coast of present-day Ghana, near modern Cape Coast. Emerging as a distinct polity in the 15th century, Fetu developed into a small but influential kingdom that played a central role in early Atlantic trade on the Gold Coast. Though originally founded by Guan-speaking migrants, Fetu became culturally and politically integrated into the wider Akan world, adopting matrilineal inheritance, asafo military companies, and court institutions characteristic of Akan polities.

From the late 15th century onward, Fetu maintained complex relations with European powers—particularly the Portuguese, Dutch, Danes, and English—leveraging its strategic position near the fortress of Elmina. It served as a key broker between inland Akan gold traders and European merchants. The kingdom is noted for resisting Portuguese monopolistic ambitions and periodically allying with rival European powers. By the mid-17th century, Fetu's influence declined due to shifting regional alliances and internal political changes, and it was eventually absorbed into the emerging Fante Confederacy.

== History ==
=== Origins ===
According to oral traditions, the people of Fetu—also known as Effutu or Afutu—descended from Guan-speaking migrants who left the Bono region in the interior during the 14th century. Their movement is linked to the broader dispersion from Tekyiman under the leadership of Nana Asaman, who had founded Bono-Manso. The Fetu rejected his authority and migrated southward, eventually settling east of Eguafo. Led by figures such as Bonde and Gyan, the Fetu founded a settlement inland, later known as Efutu. Some groups, under Edwe and Etumpan, continued southward and established Cape Coast (Oguaa), while others moved further along the coast to found towns like Legho (Dwemma) and Simpa (Winneba).

These migrations brought the Fetu into contact with the Etsi, who were already settled along the coast and claimed kinship ties with the Bono. The Fetu settled in a coastal zone that became politically organized and later recognized as a distinct kingdom by the 15th century. Although of Guan origin, Fetu underwent a gradual Akanization. They adopted matrilineal inheritance, Akan religious systems, and the seven-day week, while their language was increasingly influenced by Fante and Twi. By the 17th century, Fetu was culturally and politically integrated into the broader Akan world. J.K. Fynn classified Fetu among the "pre-Borbor Fante" states—those founded before the later wave of Akan Fante migrants from Tekyiman.

=== Early European contact ===
Fetu was among the first African states to engage diplomatically with European powers after the arrival of the Portuguese on the Gold Coast in 1471. By the early 16th century, they had established São Jorge da Mina within reach of Fetu territory. A settlement known as Aldea de Duas Partes straddled the boundary between Komenda and Fetu, illustrating the fragmented political geography of the region.

Fetu controlled key inland routes used by Akanist gold traders and exercised both commercial and diplomatic leverage over access to Elmina. Portuguese officials frequently offered gifts—including cloth, basins, and cauldrons—to the king of Fetu to secure safe passage and preserve trade. The reigning king, **Dom João**, pursued a pragmatic strategy. While engaging in diplomacy with the Portuguese, he also resisted their monopoly and welcomed interloper fleets from England, France, and the Dutch Republic. In 1556, he allowed English and French vessels to trade at Fetu ports, contributing to a marked decline in gold arriving at Elmina.

In 1577–78, Fetu joined a coalition with Eguafo and Akani forces against Portuguese-backed Elmina. The conflict led to heavy casualties and the death of the Portuguese governor. Despite these confrontations, Fetu consistently prioritized autonomy, using rivalries among European powers to strengthen its position in Atlantic trade.

=== Conflicts and decline ===
Fetu historically fought many wars with the neighboring Fante Confederacy in the 17th and 18th centuries. Repeated conflicts, particularly the Komenda Wars, left the kingdom weakened and dependent on Eguafo. The Fante intervened aggressively in internal Fetu affairs between 1707 and 1711, before finally cementing their influence in 1720. This control was short-lived, but Fante permanently incorporated Fetu into the confederacy in the late 18th century.

By the early 18th century, Effutu’s relative autonomy eroded under pressure from expanding neighbors. Denkyira’s military campaigns disrupted inland trade routes, and Asante raids further weakened coastal outposts. Although occasional alliances—such as a temporary pact with Komenda—briefly revitalized trade, the kingdom never fully recovered its mid-17th-century prominence. Oral tradition holds that, by 1720, most royal lineages accepted tributary status under Fante hegemony, surrendering formal sovereignty but retaining local chieftaincies.

Fetu's material culture—particularly its distinctive funerary masks and brass pan-ware—continues to inform regional museum collections. Descendant communities (e.g., Winneba, Mumford) preserve linguistic traces of Guan origins. Modern historians emphasize that, despite political absorption, the legacy of its hybrid Guan-Akan institutions contributed to the broader cultural matrix of southern Ghana.

== Society, Economy and Military ==
=== Society ===
Social cohesion in the kingdom rested on Asafo companies, each affiliated with a lineage and town quarter. These groups coordinated collective tasks such as bush clearing, communal defense, and funerary rites while also forming the core of local militias. Members participated in hunts and guarded palisaded enclosures; during funerals, they acted as pallbearers and ceremonial escorts, reflecting the importance of ancestor veneration. Chiefs levied labor through Asafo channels to build infrastructure—canals, stockades—and to provision war efforts when needed. Oral accounts note that funerary pageantry united all segments of society and reinforced descent-group loyalties and allegiance to the king.

Inheritance, succession, and land tenure were governed by matrilineal clans. The queen mother (ʉmankwani) played a decisive role in determining royal succession, while senior women (abusuahemaa) managed disputes related to property and family matters. Male citizens advanced through age grades, which defined their obligations in military and civic affairs. Upon reaching senior status, they joined town councils and helped maintain shrines. Despite widespread cultural assimilation, some Guan traditions—such as naming rituals and river spirit ceremonies—remained embedded in local life.

=== Akanization and Cultural Integration ===
Although Effutu was founded by Guan-speaking migrants, it increasingly adopted the institutions, beliefs, and political culture of neighboring Akan states. By the 17th century, its structures had been thoroughly reshaped through Akan influence.

The government incorporated standard Akan systems, including the position of Ohene (king), supported by a council of elders and lineage representatives. Inheritance shifted from patrilineal to matrilineal, placing authority in the hands of maternal clans (abusua), consistent with regional customs. Military organization followed the Akan Asafo model, where each extended family was tied to a company responsible for defense, ritual, and civic labor. This mirrored the structure found in polities like Akyem, Fante, and Denkyira.

Religious life reflected adoption of the Akan seven-day calendar and veneration of the abosom (deities) and nsamanfo (ancestors). Practices such as libation pouring, shrine offerings, and ancestor funerals became standard. The annual Fetu Afahye festival was modeled on the Akan Odwira, incorporating purification rites, sacrifices, and community renewal.

The local Effutu language incorporated many Twi and Fante terms, especially in religious and political vocabulary. While Guan elements survived, the spoken and ritual language of the elite reflected a predominantly Akanized identity. Effutu’s commercial elite—including both locals and Akanists—employed standard regional trade practices: use of gold weights, ritualized transactions, and diplomatic mediation between inland caravans and coastal factories. These customs helped position the state as a key broker in Atlantic commerce. In summary, the integration of matrilineal inheritance, Asafo military structure, spiritual beliefs, and linguistic borrowing transformed Effutu from a Guan-founded polity into a culturally and institutionally Akan state.

=== Economy ===
The local economy blended agriculture, craft production, and participation in Atlantic trade networks. Coastal settlements operated fishing fleets supplying salt, dried fish, and palm oil to inland towns. Canoes transported commodities such as slaves, kola nuts, and livestock to European forts. Metalworkers used small forges to produce hoes, cutlasses, and brass manillas for local and external use.

Gold dust, extracted from nearby alluvial deposits, remained the kingdom’s principal export. Forest traders gathered at the Cabo Corso market, where they bartered gold for cloth, copperware, and firearms. European accounts describe crowded stalls and traders carrying gold in leather pouches, often raising complaints about foreign monopolies. Internal tolls (akosoɔ) were imposed on trading caravans, funding royal stipends and outfitting Asafo companies. Revenue also went toward public works such as bridges and grain warehouses.

=== Military ===
The arrival of firearms in the mid-17th century reshaped the kingdom’s military balance. Early transactions—where enslaved youth were exchanged for muskets—reduced manpower. Dutch records suggest losses of up to 600 individuals per trade cycle, creating short-term demographic decline. Even so, Asafo captains (asafohene) remained effective commanders, deploying mixed forces armed with muskets, bows, and cutlasses in both raids and defensive patrols.

Local commanders adopted tactics suited to the coastal environment, including ambushes in mangroves and naval engagements using war canoes. Siege techniques, such as palisade fortifications with earthworks, were expanded under the leadership of King Fetere Ali Maen (r. 1665–1688). While the military weakened by the century’s end—partly due to rising powers like Denkyira and the Asante Empire—oral traditions record continued Asafo patrols guarding trade routes into the early 18th century.

== See also ==
- Akan people
- Guang people
- Asafo
- Odwira
- Fetu Afahye
- Fante Confederacy
- Elmina Castle
- Great Akan
- Kingdom of Denkyira
- Akyem
- House of Ghartey
- Atlantic slave trade
- Gold Coast (region)

== Sources ==
- Law, Robin (2012). "Fante Expansion Reconsidered: Seventeenth-Century Origins". Transactions of the Historical Society of Ghana (14): 41–78. ISSN 0855-3246. JSTOR 43855021.
- Deffontaine, Yann (1993). Guerre et société au royaume de Fetu (Efutu): des débuts du commerce atlantique à la constitution de la Fédération Fanti : Ghana, Côte de l'Or, 1471–1720. Ibadan: IFRA. ISBN 9782015237.
