= Kiliji language =

Sacred language of the Okule

Kiliji
- Okú-Okú
- Region: Eastern Ghana around Lake Volta
- Ethnicity: Okule practitioners, generally Guan and Ghana–Togo Mountain peoples
- Native speakers: Unknown
- Language family: Niger–Congo?: Atlantic–Congo; Volta–Niger; yeai; Yoruboid; Edekiri; Ede (Yorùbá); Ifẹ̀; Kiliji

Language codes
- ISO 639-3: –

Kiliji is a variety of Yoruba language, or a Yoruboid dialect that functions as the ritual or sacred language of the Okule or Oko Alija all-female religious community in eastern Ghana around the Lake Volta. This spiritual system is practised among the Nawuri, Adele, Achode and other Guang and Ghana-Togo Mountain language speaking villages of the area.

== Religious aspects ==
Among practitioners, the main deities of veneration are Chankpanna or Shakpana and Oko Alija (Orisha Oko). In the context of how the religion is practiced in the region, Chakpanna is also referred to as a messenger of Ogun. The name of the religious society is derived from the common Yoruba greeting for those one meets in a house or home on arrival; "O kúulé". Alternatively, it has been suggested that the name is derived from "Oku Oku", a reduplication of the common Yoruba courtesy prefix used in greeting people. The Yoruba speaking group in the areas of Aledjo, Patargo and Manigri in northern Benin and Togo go by the additional name Oku-Oku.

== Geographical area and related languages ==
Kiliji is the most westerly of the attested Yoruba dialects spoken in West Africa, outside of the Yoruba diasporic communities represented by the Aku/Oku people in Sierra Leone and The Gambia, and both its speech form and the religious practices associated with it are clearly of Yoruba provenance. It bears the closest resemblance to the Ifè variety of the Yoruba languages spoken in Togo. Among the Adele people, the religion is called Iji Olija or Ojo Aliji, while the language of liturgy is called Gikpona or Oku Oku, which is the very same language as the Ife or Ana language of Atakpame in Togo.

== Bibliography ==
- Brindle, Jonathan; et al. (2015). "Journal of West African Languages - Kiliji, an unrecorded spiritual language of eastern Ghana". journalofwestafricanlanguages.org.
