= Efutu =

Efutu may refer to:

- Efutu people
- Efutu language
