= Okule =

Ghanaian female cult

Okule is a female cult among the Nawuri people and other Guans like the Achode, Adele, Nchumurus, and the Krachis, who are located in the Northern and Oti Regions of Ghana. The name Okule is a corruption of Okuoku, which is a form of greeting among members of the Okule cult. While Okule is the name of the group, among devotees, Chankpana is the name of the deity or the secret cultic practice in which women are initiated and venerate the Chankpana spirit or deity. Okule use a special language called Kiliji, which is spoken only by the members. The language is central to all aspects of life in this community, including everyday conversations, singing, ceremonial rituals, and divination practices. Newcomers are expected to learn Kiliji because of their culture.

== Structure ==
The leaders of the community comprise several key figures: Olami, who holds the highest position as the overall leader; Onuagyimgyi, respected senior members or the council of elders; Omaseibo, the diviner; Olami Akpakya, known as the disciplinarian or commander within the group, greatly respected and feared by all members; Olikukuami, the principal singer; Alagbe, the drummer; and Ola Gongong, the gong beater or public announcer.

== Recruitment ==
Only women are recruited. Before becoming a member, every individual goes through recruitment and training. People join the cult either voluntarily or through possession. If any female wants to be a member voluntarily, she first places her hands on her head and starts shouting the words “jei, jei, jei” while running to the residence of the Olami, the cult leader. On arrival, the Olami will send for other senior members of the cult, and libation is poured to Chankpana to accept the newcomer. This form of recruitment is common among young women whose relatives are already in the cult.

Involuntary recruitment occurs when the individual is possessed by the spirit of Chankpana. The possessed person will involuntarily begin to run to the house of the Olami, shouting “jei, jei, jei”.

Both forms of recruitment are similar but differ in the location of the start of the occurrence and the behavior of the recruitment. The voluntary recruitment typically originates in the home of the individual, while involuntary can occur in various locations, such as the market or farm. Behaviorally, the possessed individual is typically restless and will roam throughout the community, requiring the Olami to recite incantations to call the recruit and keep them in place. With voluntary possession, it is generally easier for the individual to regain composure after performing a libation.

== Training ==
Formal acceptance into the cult begins after the recruitment. The training begins by removing all the clothes from new members, the fabrics from then are considered unclean. The recruits are made to wear cowries around their waist, ankles and necks. Those who could afford smaller bells could buy and tie them on their ankles. The bells signal their presence as they walk around the community. The Olami officially perform rites to begin the training. She gives the group a collective name Aleri, which means newcomers or novices. The first to arrive for training is given the name Onimgbo, and the last person is also called Nkianyi. They are made to abandon their day names and from then observed several rules in their gait to distinguish themselves.

The Kiliji language is learnt during the training process. All activities are done in the language: daily communication, singing, ritual performances, and divination. During the training period older members speak none of the local languages except the Kiliji. This is practice to make it easy for the new members to pick the language faster.

At the time of training, they are supposed to stay in the house of the Olami. Family members could visit and present gifts, mainly foodstuff and money. Such offertories went into a shared pool and used to prepare meals for the entire group and their instructors or mentors.

== Environmental Significance ==
In training, new members learn about plants and animals in the bushes. The experiences in the bush fosters their belief on how the spirit world interacts with humans. They are also taught the various uses of animals and plants. In the wilderness, they follow taboos, one of which is the prohibition on harming or killing reptiles, particularly the highly revered python. The practices of the Okule help to preserve the environment around such communities. In most of the communities where the Okule exist, forests have been reserved for their use.
