= Elmina Castle =

Fort and former trading post in Elmina, Ghana

UNESCO World Heritage Site
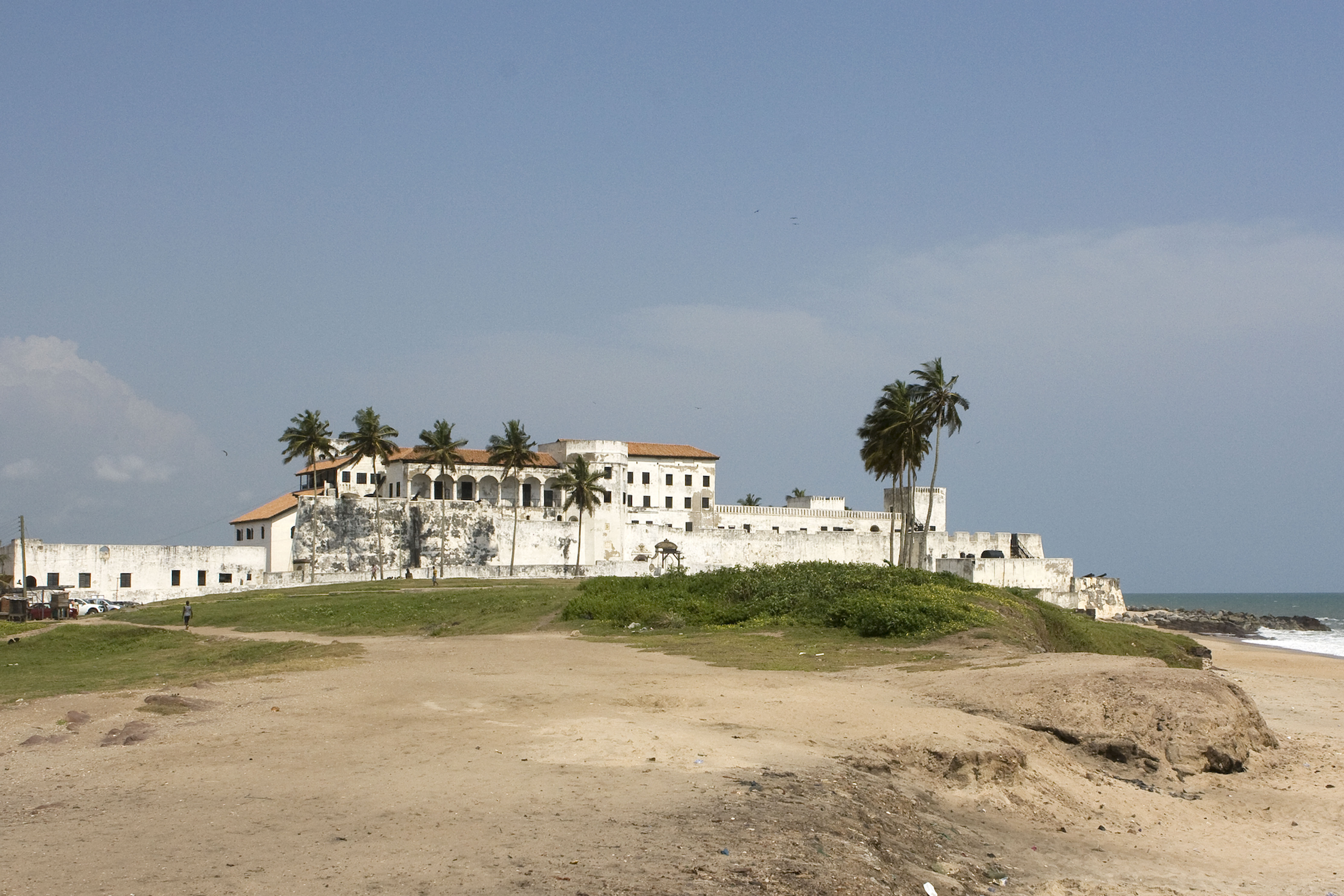

- Location within Ghana
- Official name: Elmina Castle (St. George's Castle / Fort St. Jorge)
- Location: Elmina, Central Region, Ghana
- Part of: Forts and Castles, Volta, Greater Accra, Central and Western Regions
- Criteria: Cultural: (vi)
- Reference: 34-011
- Inscription: 1979 (3rd Session)
- Coordinates: 5°04′57″N 1°20′53″W

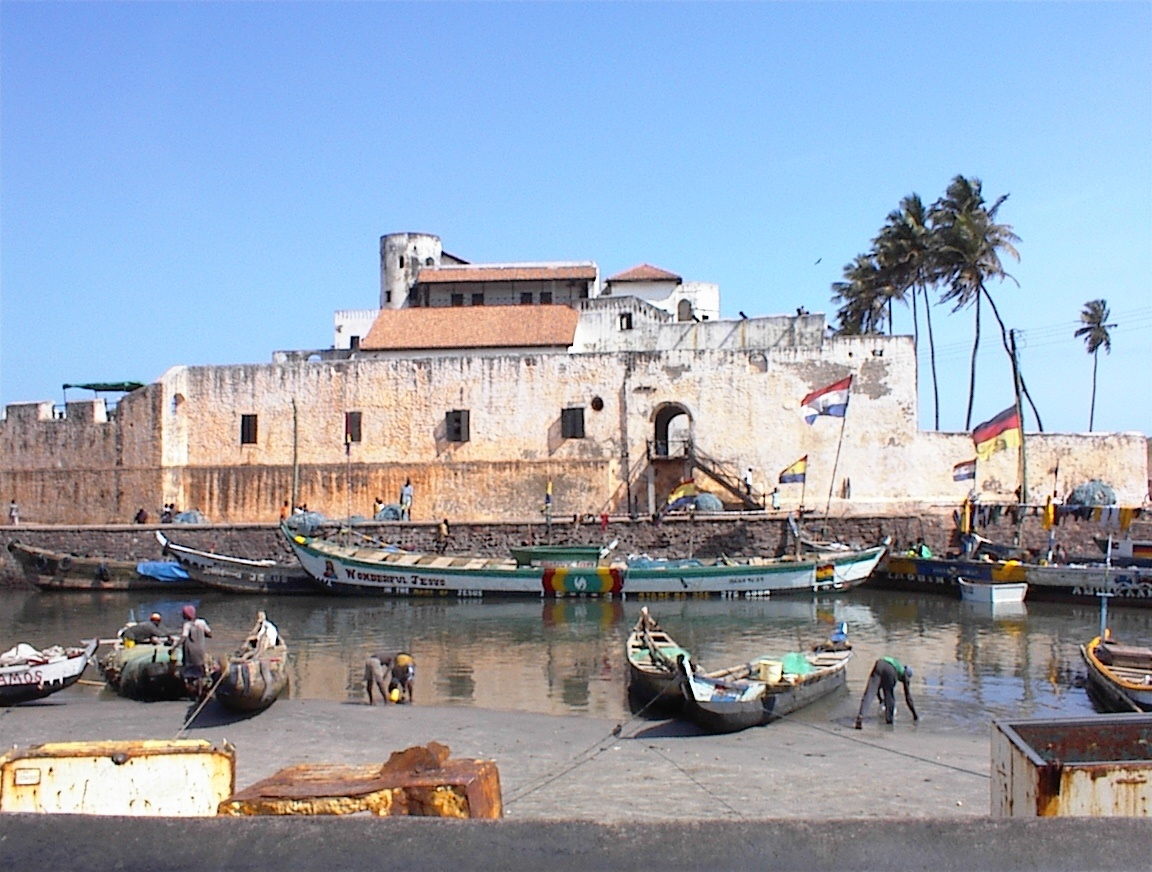
St. George Castle

Elmina Castle, or Fort St. George, was erected by the Portuguese in 1482 as Castelo de São Jorge da Mina ('St. George of the Mine Castle'), also known as Castelo da Mina or simply Mina (or Feitoria da Mina), in present-day Elmina, Ghana, formerly the Gold Coast. It holds several profound distinctions: it was the first trading post built on the Gulf of Guinea and is the oldest extant European building in Sub-Saharan Africa.

First established as a trade settlement for indigenous people of the region, the castle later became one of the most important stops of the Atlantic slave trade. The Dutch West India Company seized the fort from the Portuguese in 1637, after an unsuccessful attempt in 1596; they took over all of the Portuguese Gold Coast in 1642. The slave trade continued under the Dutch until 1814.

In 1872, the Dutch Gold Coast, including the fort, became a possession of the United Kingdom in its treaty with the Dutch that divided dominance and forts in colonial territories.

The Gold Coast gained its independence as Ghana from the United Kingdom in 1957. It controls the castle.

Elmina Castle is a historical site and destination. The castle is recognised by UNESCO as a World Heritage Site, along with other castles and forts in Ghana, because of its place in the Atlantic slave trade. It is a major tourist attraction in Ghana. German director Werner Herzog used it as a major filming location for his drama Cobra Verde (1987).

== History ==
=== Pre-Portuguese ===
The people living along the West African coast at Elmina around the fifteenth century were presumably Fante, with an uncertain relationship to the modern Akan who came from north of the forests. Among their ancestors were merchants and miners who traded gold to the Mediterranean and Near Eastern worlds from medieval times.

The people on the West African coast were organised into numerous populations that were drawn according to kinship lines. Family was extremely important in society, and family heads were united in communities under a recognised local authority. Along the Gold Coast alone, more than twenty independent kingdom-states existed. Elmina lay between two different Fante kingdoms, Fetu and Eguafo.

West Africans nurtured ancient trade connections to other parts of the world. Common metal trade, iconic artistic forms, and agricultural borrowing show that trans-Saharan and regional coastal connections thrived. The Portuguese in 1471 were the first Europeans to visit the Gold Coast, but not necessarily the first sailors to reach the port.

=== Portuguese arrival ===
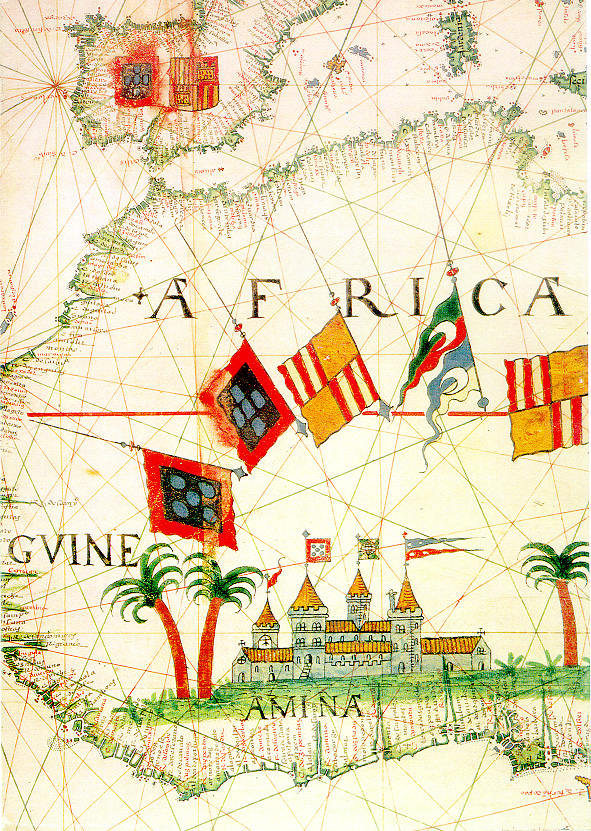
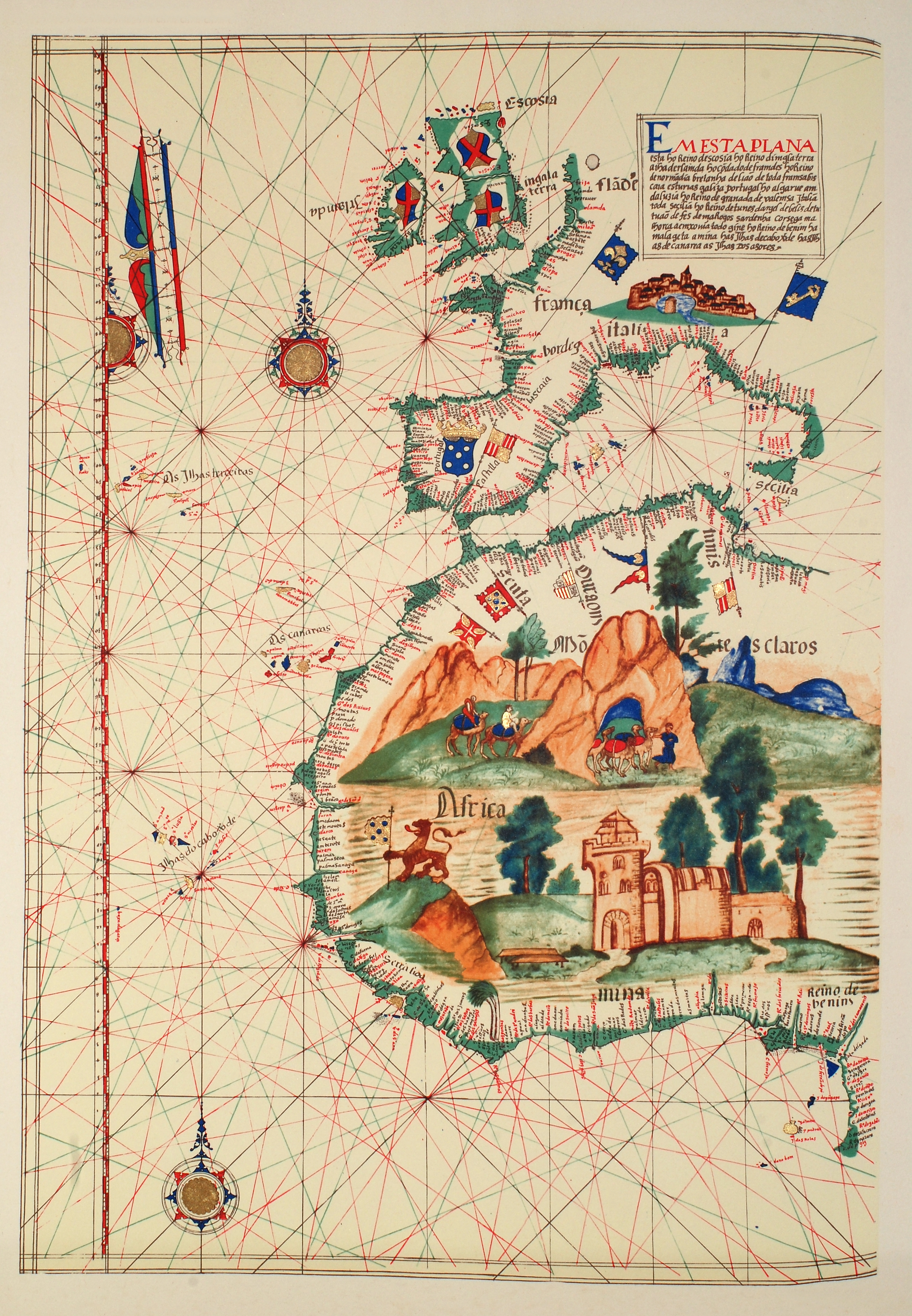
Two 16th-century maps of the west African coast, showing A mina (the mine)

The Portuguese first reached what became known as the Gold Coast in 1471. Prince Henry the Navigator had sent ships to explore the African coast beginning in 1418, and the gradually moved along the coast to this area. The Portuguese had several motives for voyaging south. They were attracted by rumours of fertile African lands whose people were rich in gold and ivory. They also sought a southern route to India so as to circumvent Arab traders and establish direct trade with Asia.

In line with the strong religious sentiments of the time, another focus of the Portuguese was Christian proselytism. They also sought to form an alliance with the legendary Prester John, who was believed to be the leader of a great Christian nation somewhere far from Europe.

These motives prompted the Portuguese to develop the Guinea trade. They made gradual progress down the African coast, each voyage reaching a point further along than the last. This resulted in a series of trading posts along the route, where they could acquire fresh water and food to be taken on board. After fifty years of coastal exploration, the Portuguese reached Elmina in 1471, during the reign of King Afonso V.

Because Portuguese royalty had lost interest in African exploration as a result of meagre returns, the Guinea trade was put under the oversight of the Portuguese trader, Fernão Gomes. Upon reaching present-day Elmina, Gomes discovered a thriving gold trade already established among the natives and visiting Arab and Berber traders. He established his own trading post. It became known to the Portuguese as "A Mina" (the Mine) because of the gold that could be found there.

=== Construction of the castle ===
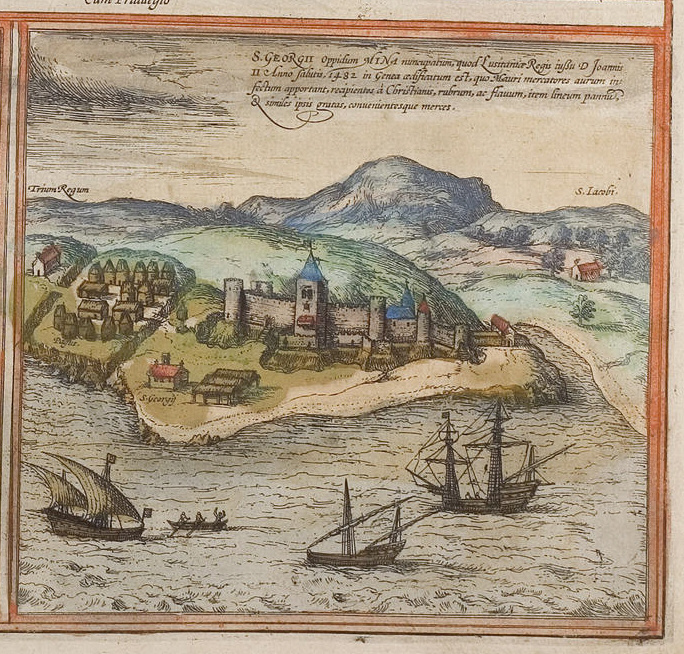
Elmina Castle viewed from the sea in 1572, by Georg Braun. Notice Portuguese ships in the foreground and African houses/town shown in the left-hand corner and in various areas around the fort.

Trade between Elmina and Portugal grew throughout the decade following the establishment of the trading post under Gomes. In 1481, the recently crowned John II decided to build a fort on the coast in order to ensure the protection of this trade, which was once again held as a royal monopoly. King John II sent all of the materials needed to build the fort on ten caravels and two transport ships. The supplies, which included everything from heavy foundation stones to roof tiles, were sent in pre-fitted form, along with provisions for six hundred men. Under the command of Diogo de Azambuja, the fleet set sail on 12 December 1481 and arrived at Elmina, in a village called Of Two Parts a little over a month later, on 19 January 1482. Some historians note that Christopher Columbus was among those to make the voyage to the Gold Coast with this fleet.

Upon arrival, Azambuja contracted a Portuguese trader, who had lived at Elmina for some time, to arrange and interpret an official meeting with the local chief, Kwamin Ansah, interpreted from the Portuguese, "Caramansa." Azambuja told the chief of the great advantages in building a fort, including protection from the very powerful king of Portugal. During the meeting, Azambuja and Chief Kwamin Ansah both participated in a massive peace ritual that included a feast, musicians, and many participants, both Portuguese and native.

Chief Kwamin Ansah, while accepting Azambuja as he had any other Portuguese trader who arrived on his coast, was wary of a permanent settlement. However, with firm plans already in place, the Portuguese would not be deterred. After offering gifts, making promises, and hinting at the consequences of noncompliance, the Portuguese received Kwamin Ansah's reluctant agreement.

When construction began the next morning, the chief's reluctance was proved to be well-founded. In order to build the fort in the most defensible position on the peninsula, the Portuguese had to demolish the homes of some of the villagers, who consented only after they had been compensated. The Portuguese tried to quarry a nearby rock that the people of Elmina, who were animists, believed to be the home of the god of the nearby river Benya.

Prior to the demolition of the quarry and homes, Azambuja sent a Portuguese crew member, João Bernaldes, with gifts to deliver to Chief Kwamin Ansah and the villagers. Azambuja sent brass basins, shawls, and other gifts in hopes of winning the goodwill of the villagers so they would not be upset during the demolition of their homes and sacred rocks. However, João Bernaldes did not deliver the gifts until after construction began, by which time the villagers became upset upon witnessing the demolition without forewarning or compensation.

In response to this, the local people forged an attack that resulted in several Portuguese deaths. Finally, an understanding was reached. Continued opposition led the Portuguese to burn the local village in retaliation. Even in this tense atmosphere, the first story of the tower was completed after only twenty days. This was the result of the Portuguese having brought so many prefabricated building materials. The remainder of the fort and an accompanying church were completed soon afterwards, despite resistance.

=== Immediate impact ===
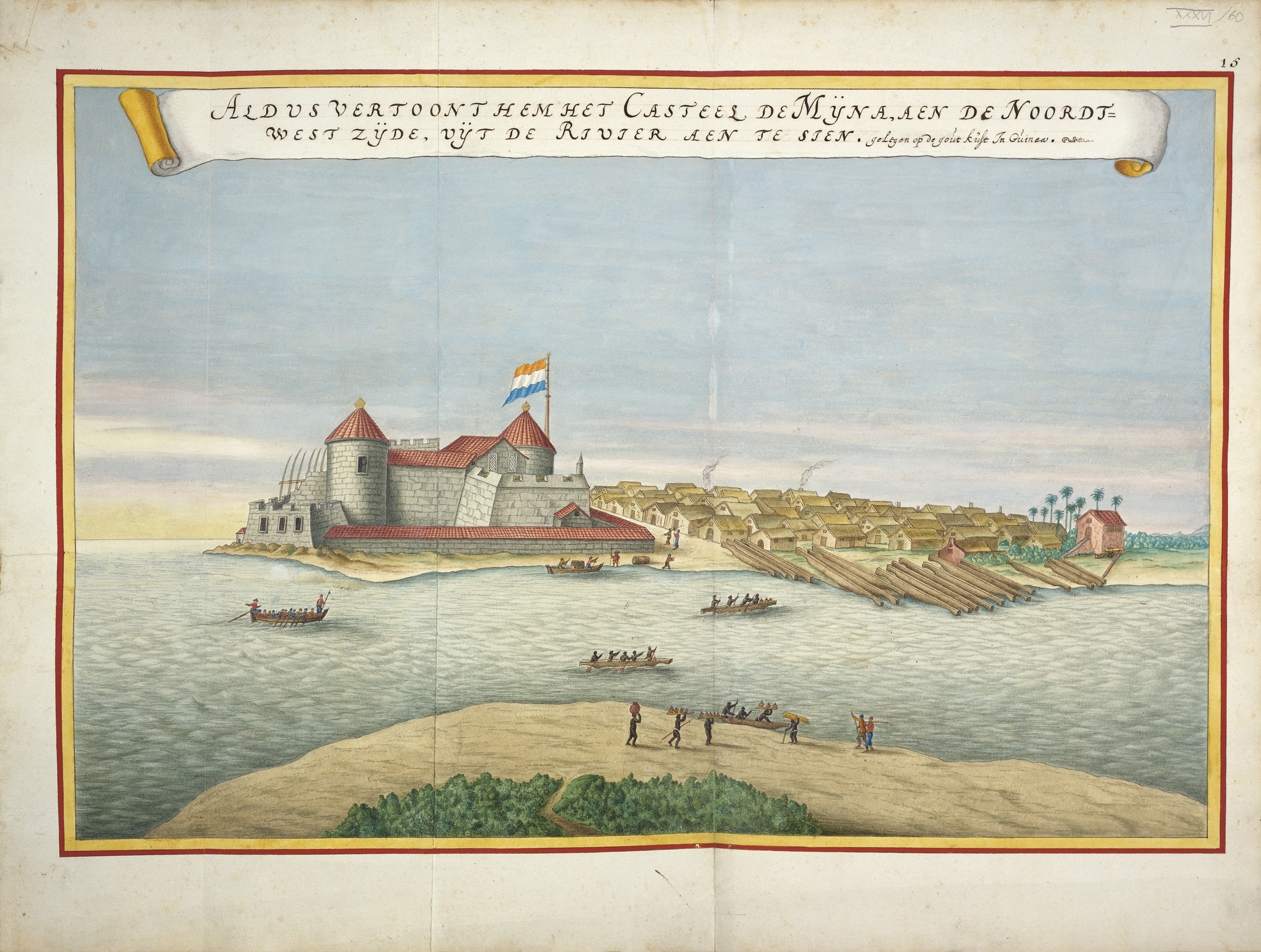
Elmina Castle in the Blaeu-van der Hem Atlas (1660s)

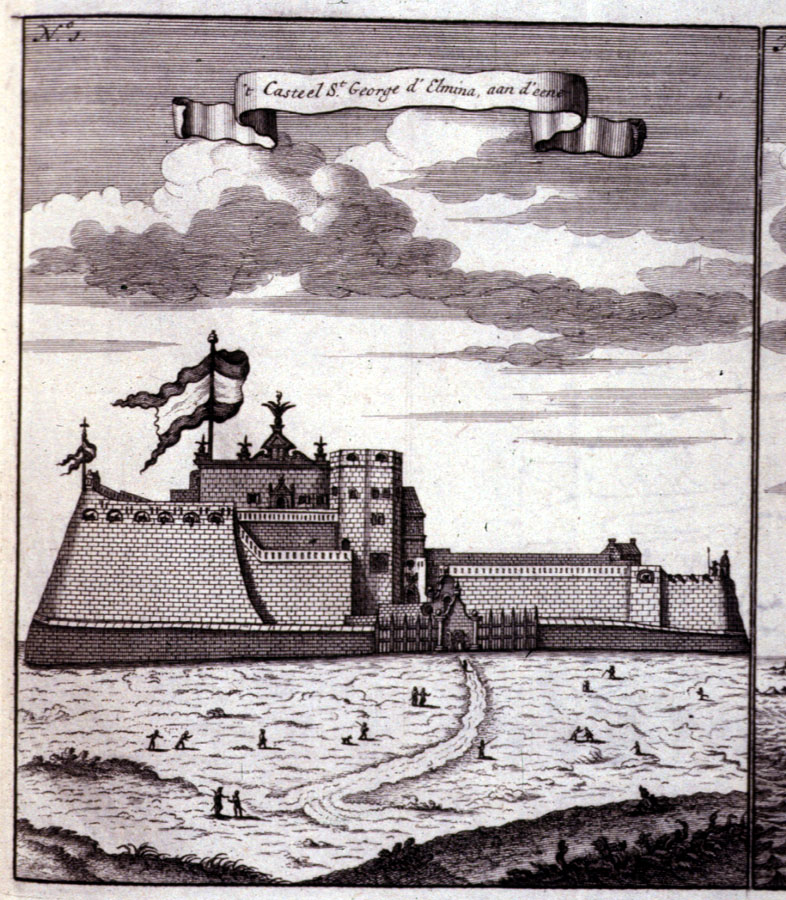
Elmina Castle flying the Flag of the Netherlands (1704)

The fort was the first prefabricated building of European origin to have been planned and executed in Sub-Saharan Africa. Upon its completion, Elmina was established as a proper city. Azambuja was named governor, and King John II added the title "Lord of Guinea" to his noble titles. Fort St. George took on the military and economic importance that had previously been held by the Portuguese factory at Arguim Island, on the southern edge of Mauritania. At the height of the gold trade in the early sixteenth century, 680,000 g (24,000 oz) of gold were exported annually from the Gold Coast, accounting for one-tenth of the world's supply.

The new fort, signifying the permanent involvement of Europeans in West Africa, had a considerable effect on Africans living on the coast. At the urging of the Portuguese, Elmina declared itself an independent state, whose governor took control of the town's affairs. The people of Elmina were offered Portuguese protection against attacks from neighbouring coastal tribes, with whom the Portuguese had much less genial relations, even though they were friendly with the powerful trading nations in the African interior.

If any locals attempted to trade with a nation other than Portugal, the Portuguese reacted with aggressive force, often by forming alliances with the betraying nation's enemies. Hostility between groups increased, and the traditional organisation of native societies suffered, especially after the Portuguese introduced them to firearms, which made the dominance of the stronger nations easier.

Trade with the Europeans helped make certain goods, such as cloth and beads, more available to the coastal people. European involvement also disrupted traditional trade routes between coastal people and northern people by cutting out the African middlemen. The population of Elmina swelled with traders from other towns hoping to trade with the Portuguese, who gradually established a West African monopoly.

=== West African slave trade ===
From the outset, the Portuguese authorities determined that St. George would not engage directly in the slave trade, as they did not wish to disrupt the gold mining and trade routes of its hinterland with the wars necessary to capture free people and enslave them. Instead, the Portuguese traded captives with several states/tribes, notably those of the Slave Coast (Benin) and São Tomé. This way, St. George served as a transshipment entrepôt.

By the seventeenth century, most trade in West Africa concentrated on the sale of captives. Fort St. George played a significant part in the West African slave trade. The castle served as a depot where enslaved Africans were brought in from different kingdoms in West Africa. The Africans, often captured in the interior by slave-catchers from coastal peoples, were sold to the Portuguese, and likewise later to Dutch traders, in exchange for goods such as textiles and horses.

=== Dutch control ===
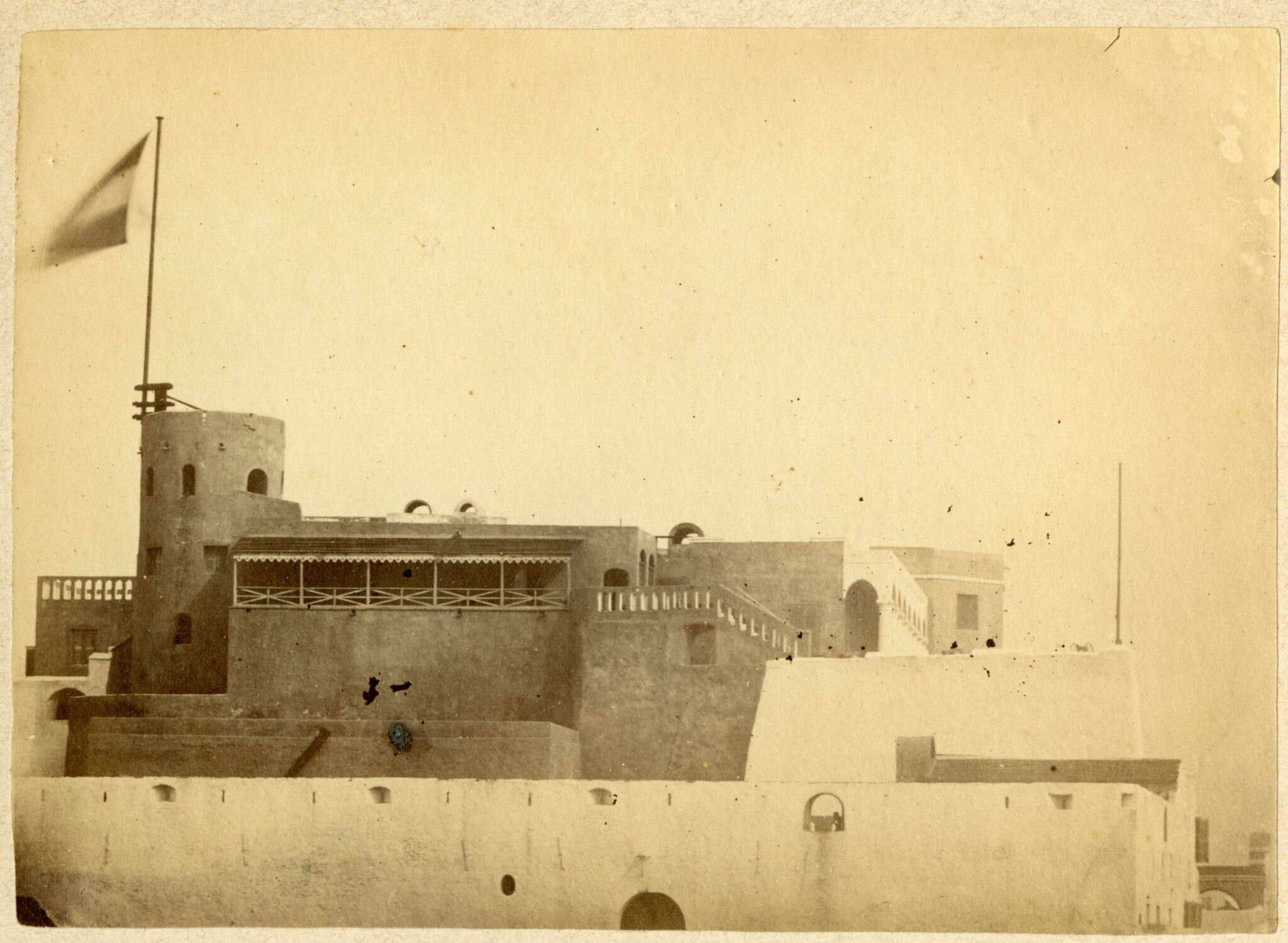
Elmina Castle (before 1872)

In 1596, the Dutch made a first unsuccessful attempt at capturing the castle. They succeeded decades later in 1637, after which this became the capital of the Dutch Gold Coast. During the period of Dutch control, they built a new, smaller fortress on a nearby hill to protect St. George's Castle from inland attacks. This fort was called Fort Coenraadsburg. The Dutch continued the triangular Atlantic slave route until 1814, when they abolished the slave trade, pursuant to the Anglo-Dutch Slave Trade Treaty.

In 1872, the British took over the Dutch territory and the fort pursuant to the Anglo-Dutch Sumatra treaties of 1871.

=== Renovation ===
Elmina Castle renovation, August 2006

The castle was extensively restored by the Ghanaian government in the 1990s. Renovation of the castle continues. Today, Elmina's economy is sustained by tourism and fishing.

Elmina Castle is preserved as a Ghanaian national museum. The monument was designated as a World Heritage Monument under UNESCO in 1979. It is a place of pilgrimage for many African Americans seeking to connect with their heritage.

== 3D documentation with terrestrial laser scanning ==
In 2006, the Zamani Project documented Elmina Castle with terrestrial 3D laser scanning. The 3D model, a panorama tour, elevations, sections and plans of Elmina Castle are available on the project's website. The non-profit research group specialises in 3D digital documentation of tangible cultural heritage. The data generated by the Zamani Project creates a permanent record that can be used for research, education, restoration, and conservation.

== Gallery ==
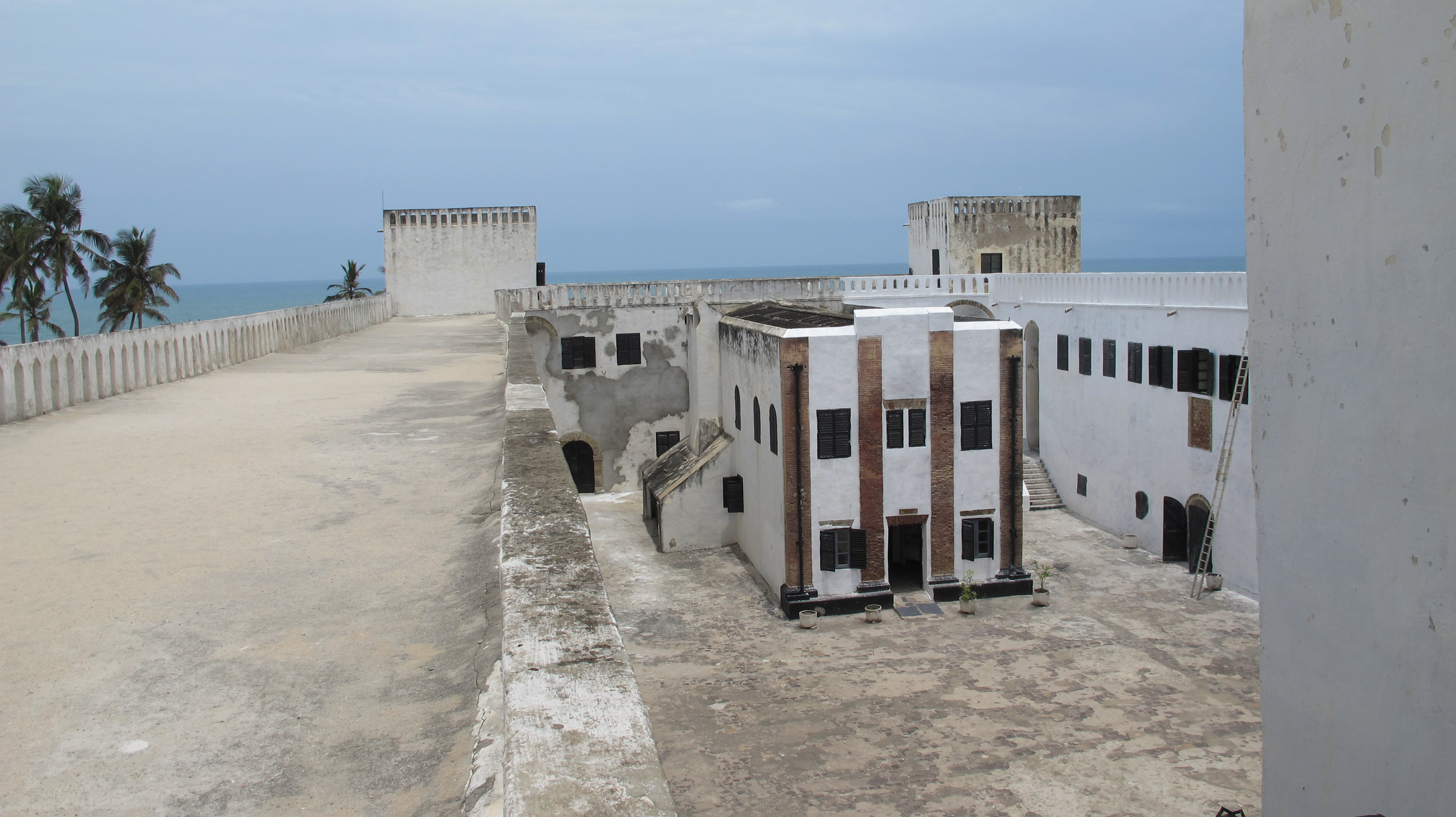
Interior courtyard and church

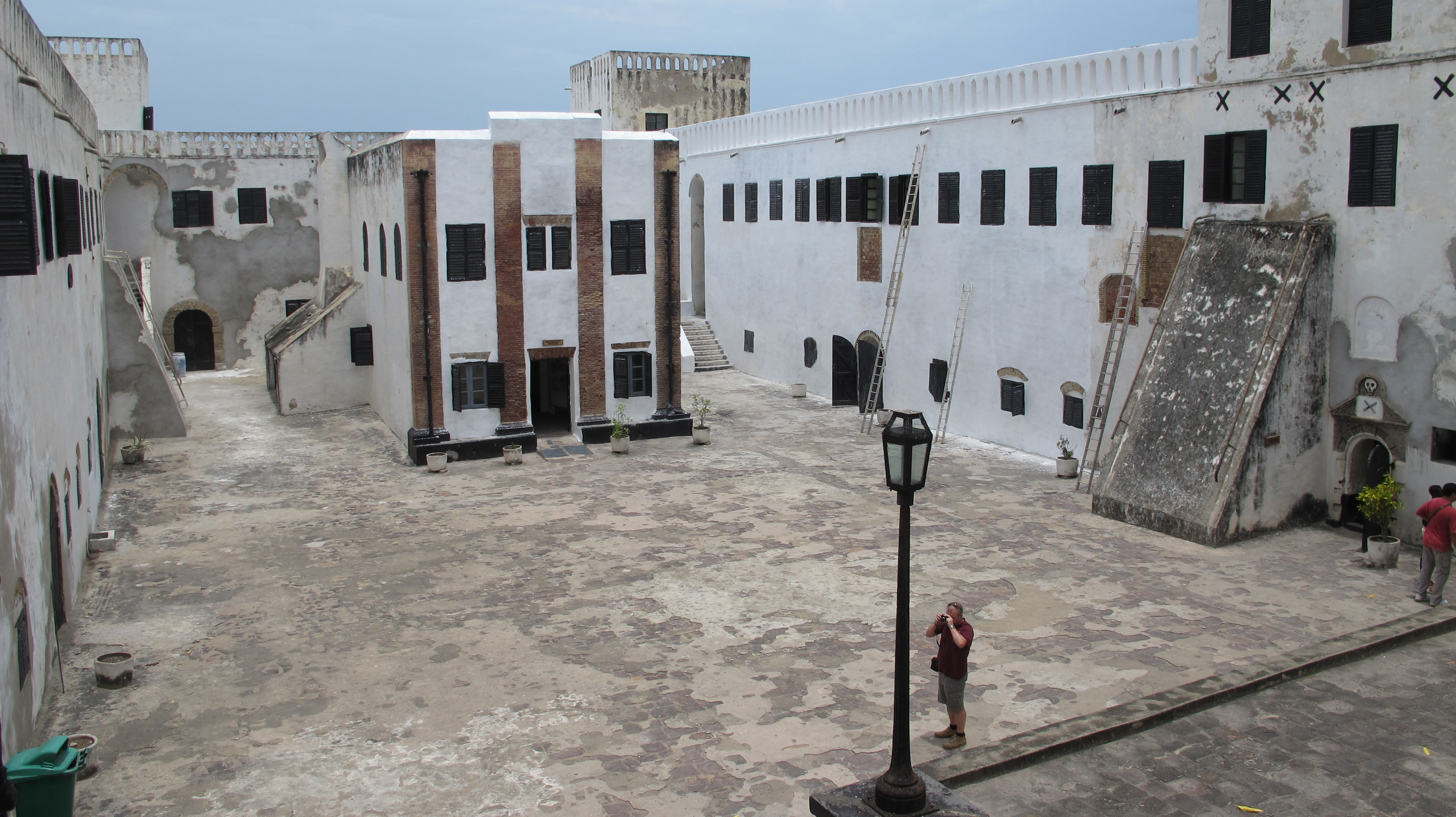
Interior courtyard and church

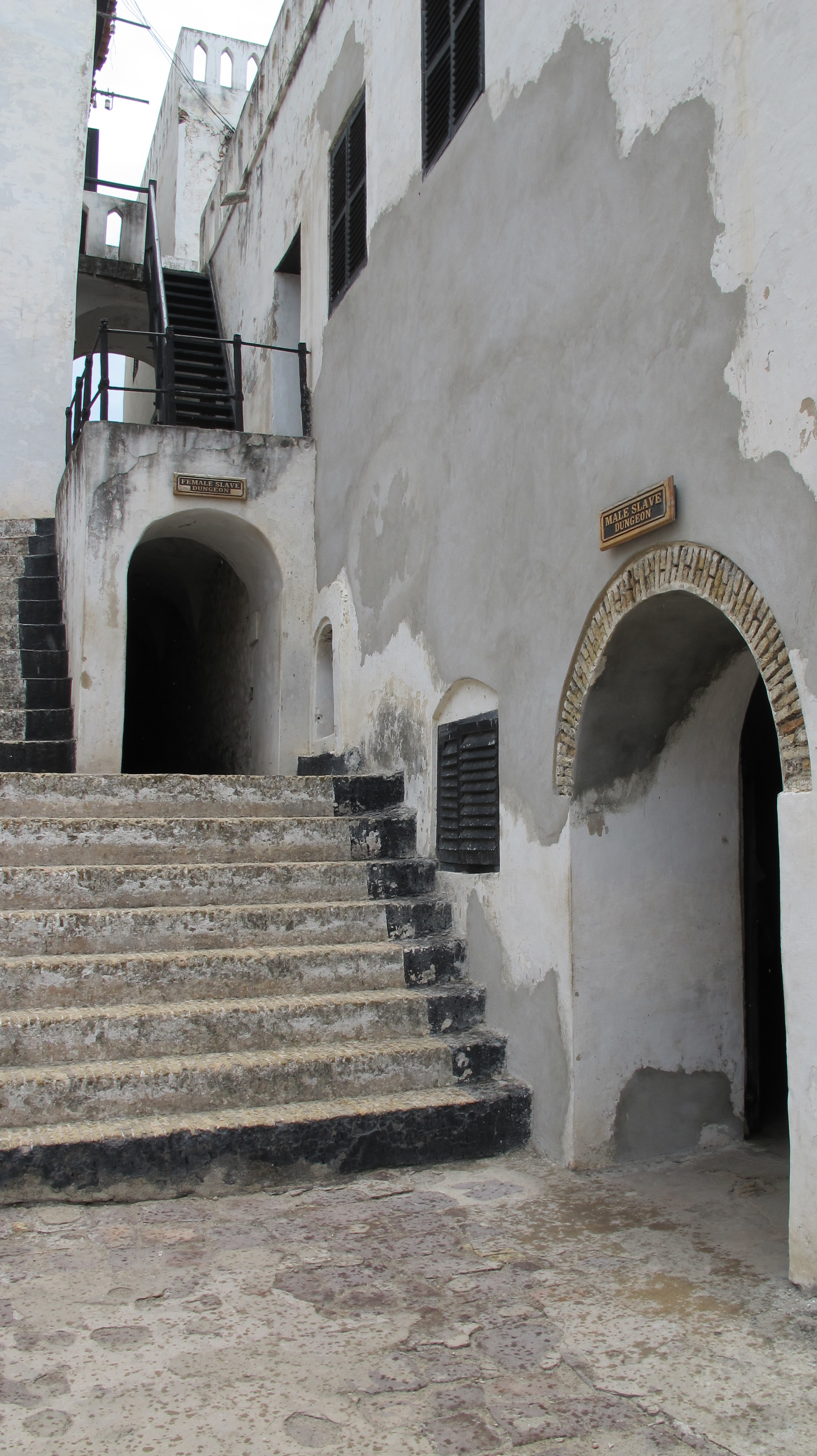
Male and female slave entrances

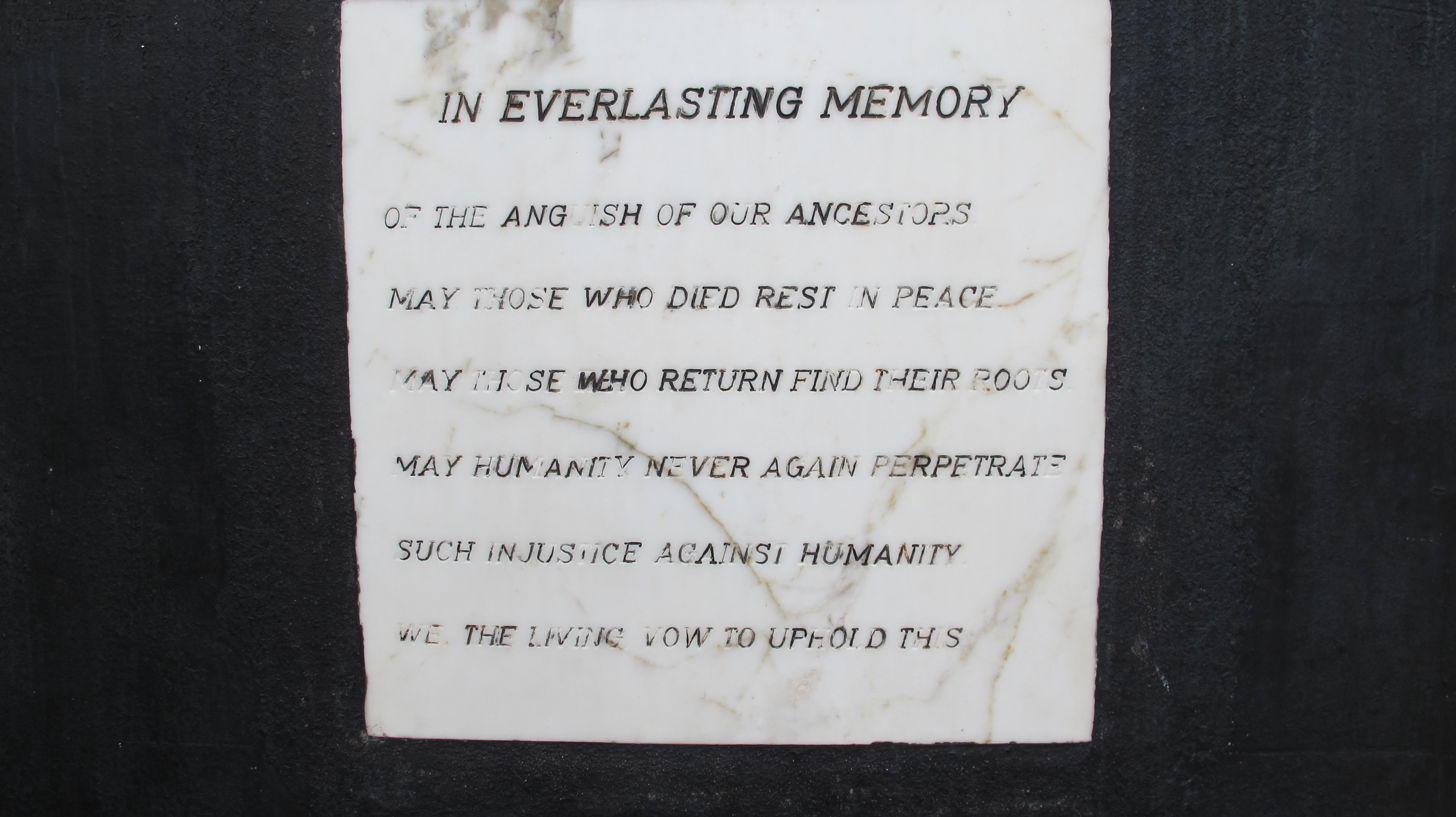
Memorial plaque

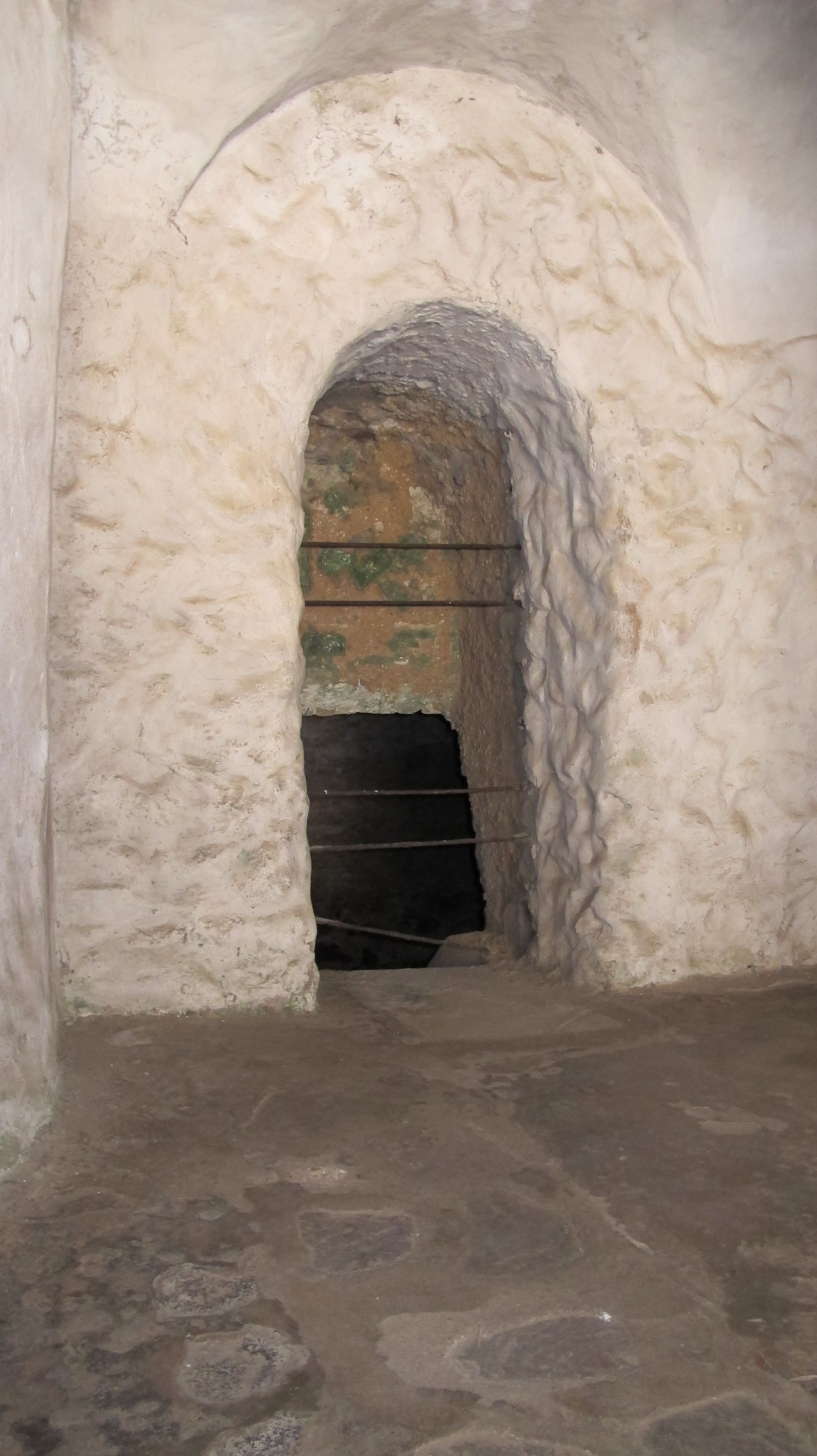
Slave export gate

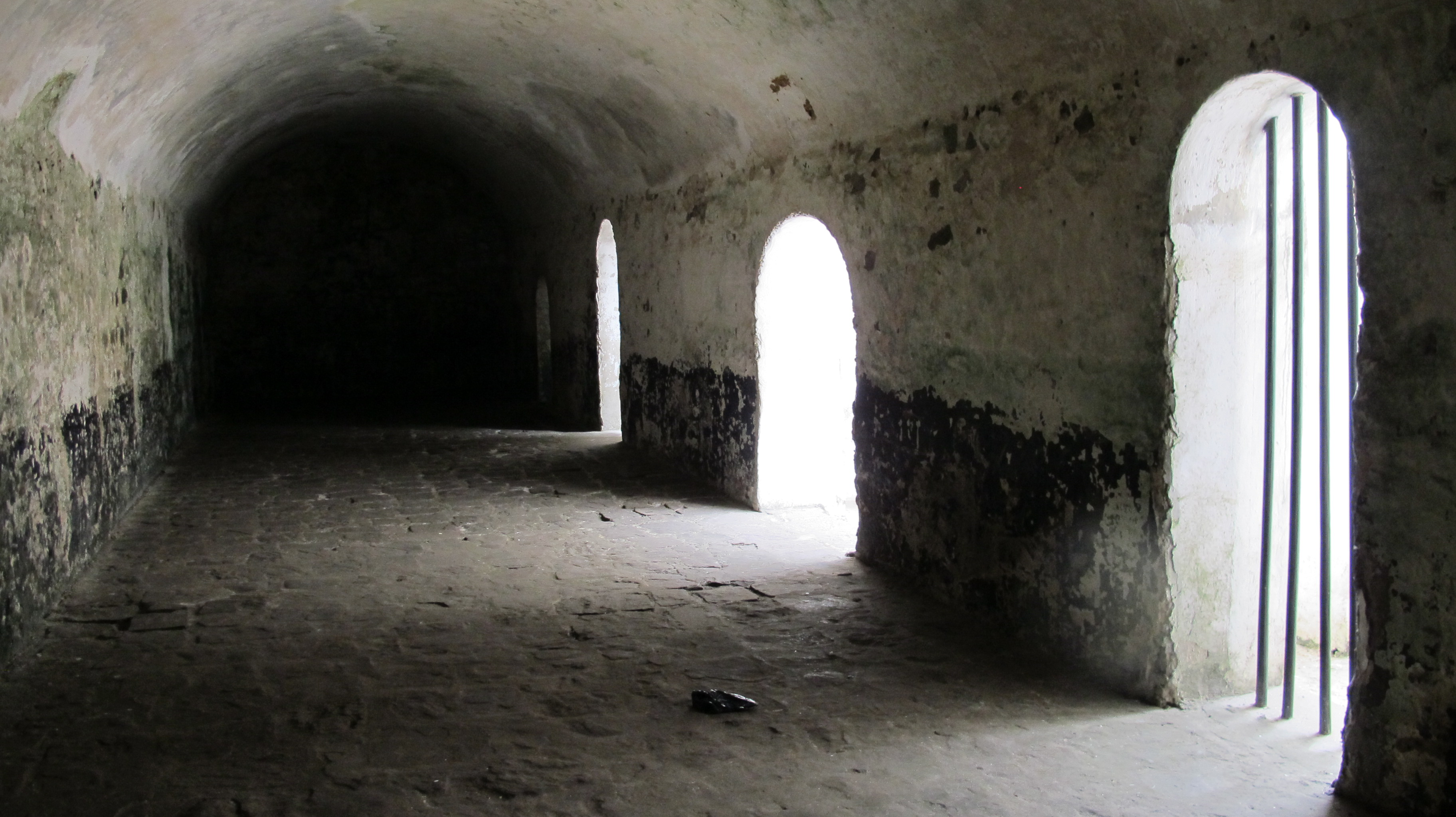
Slave holding cell

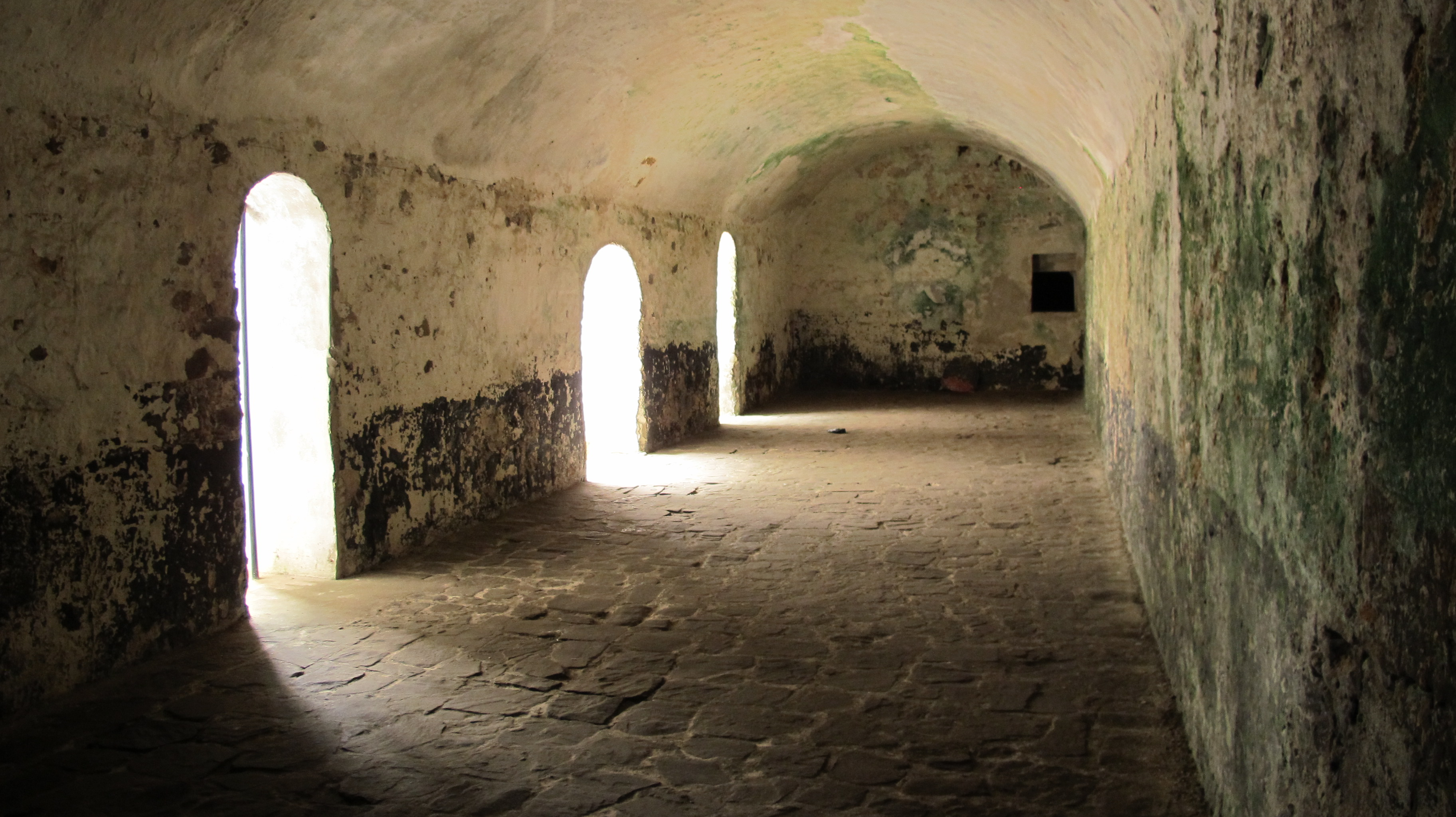
Slave holding cell

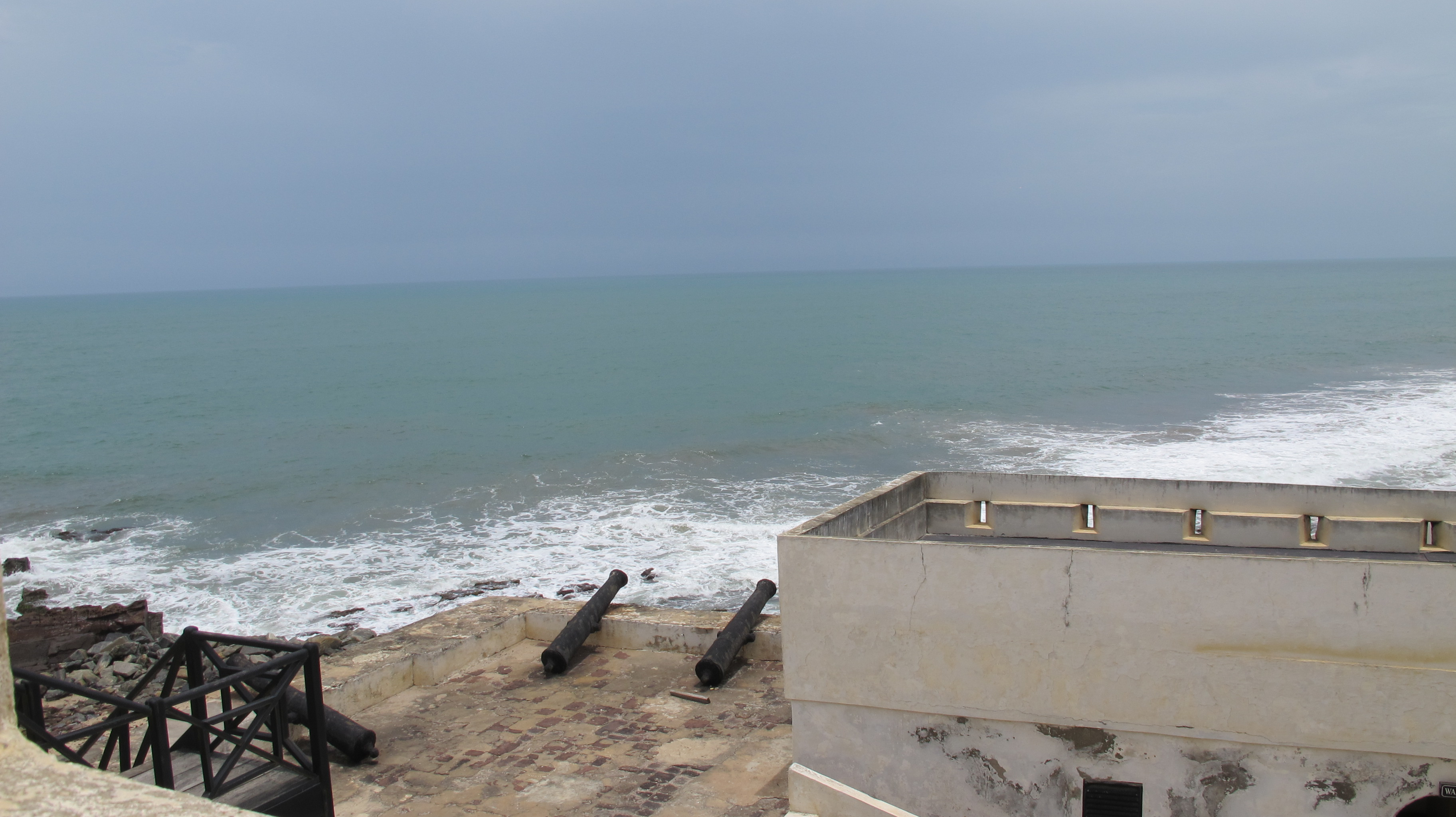
Gun defences

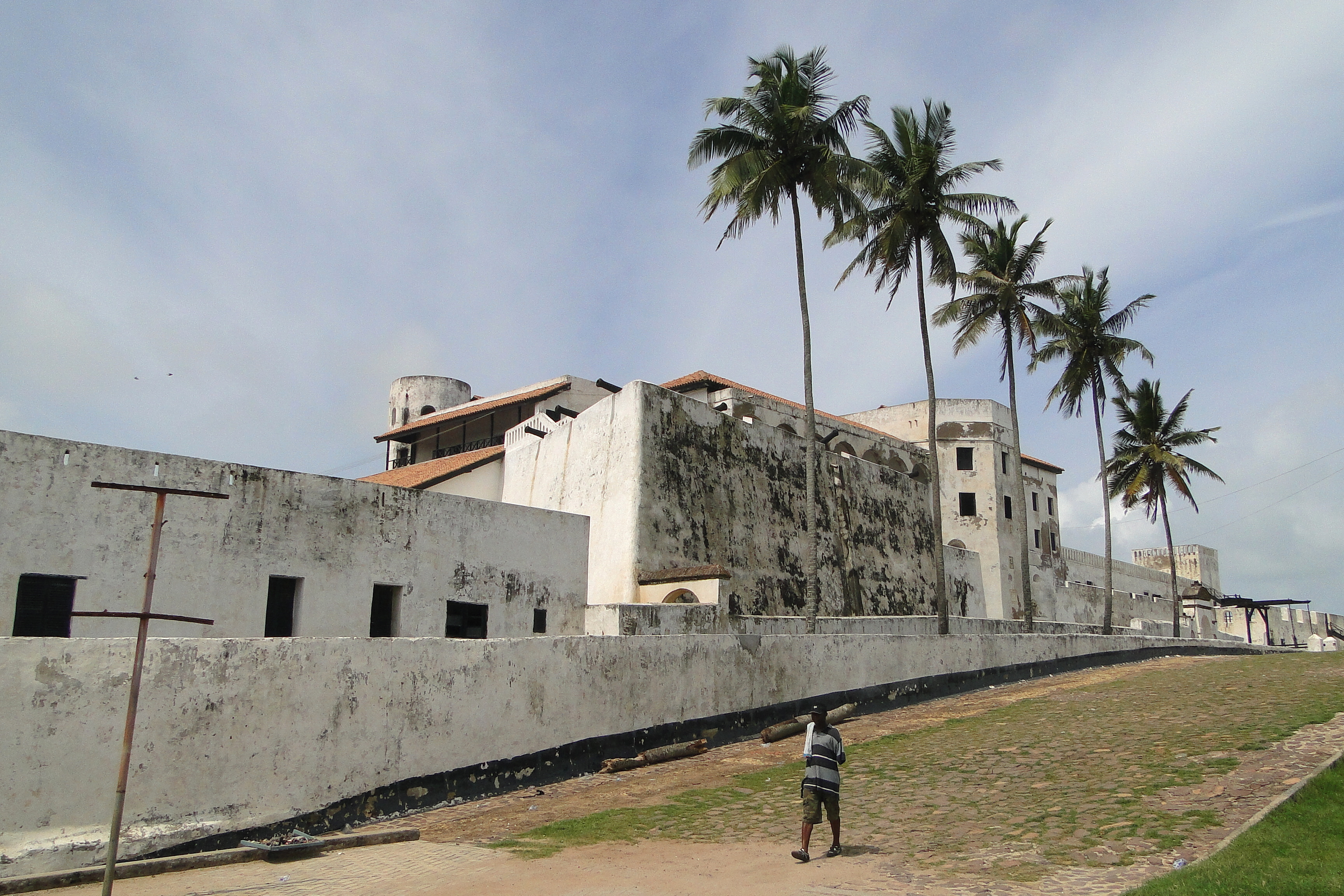
Elmina Castle

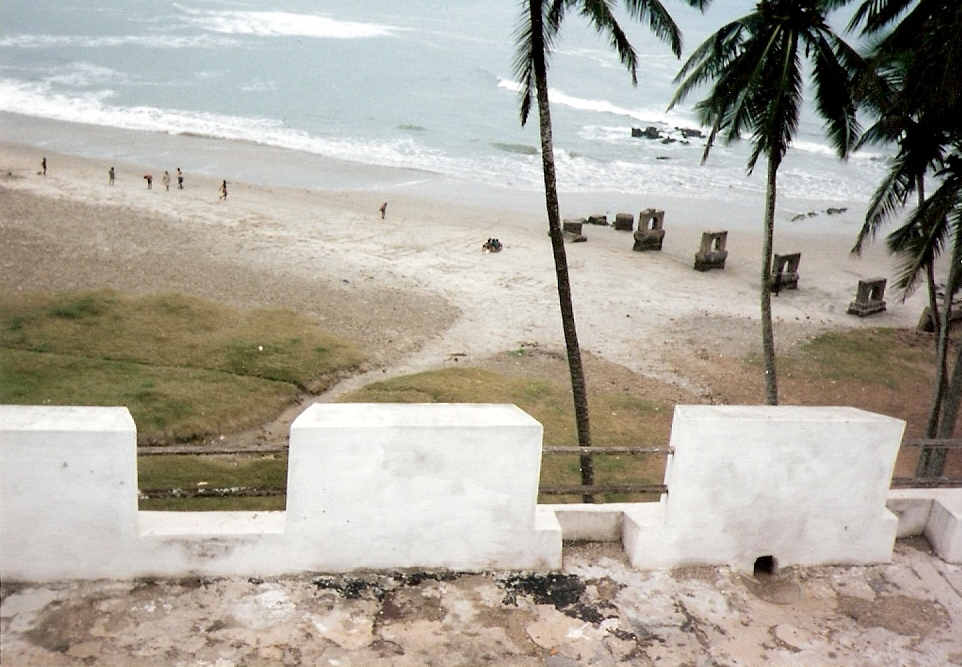
Remnants of the docks

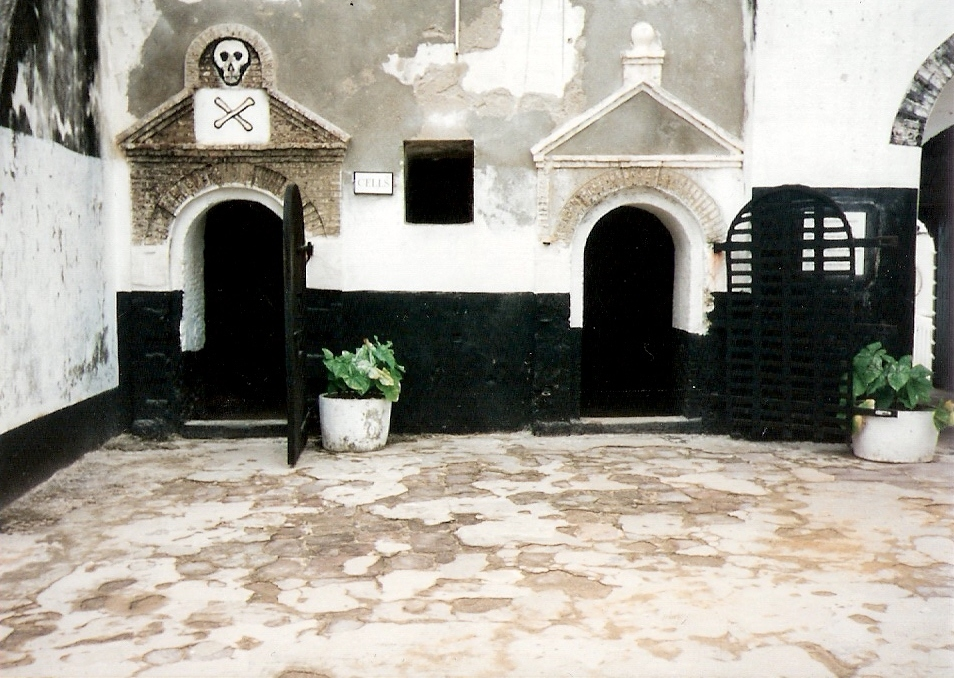
Solitary confinement rooms

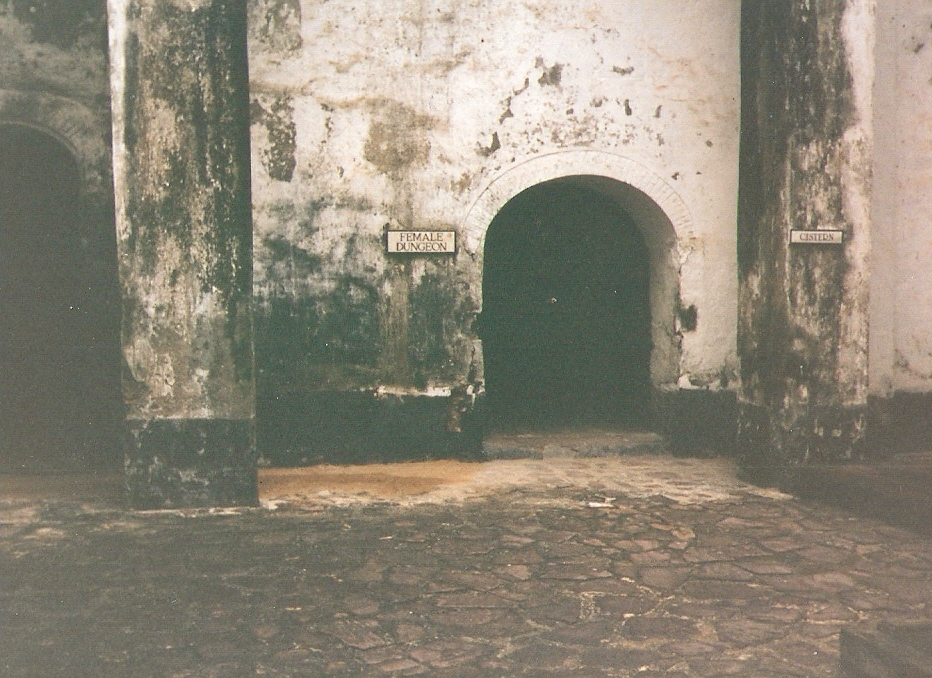
"Female Dungeon", 1995

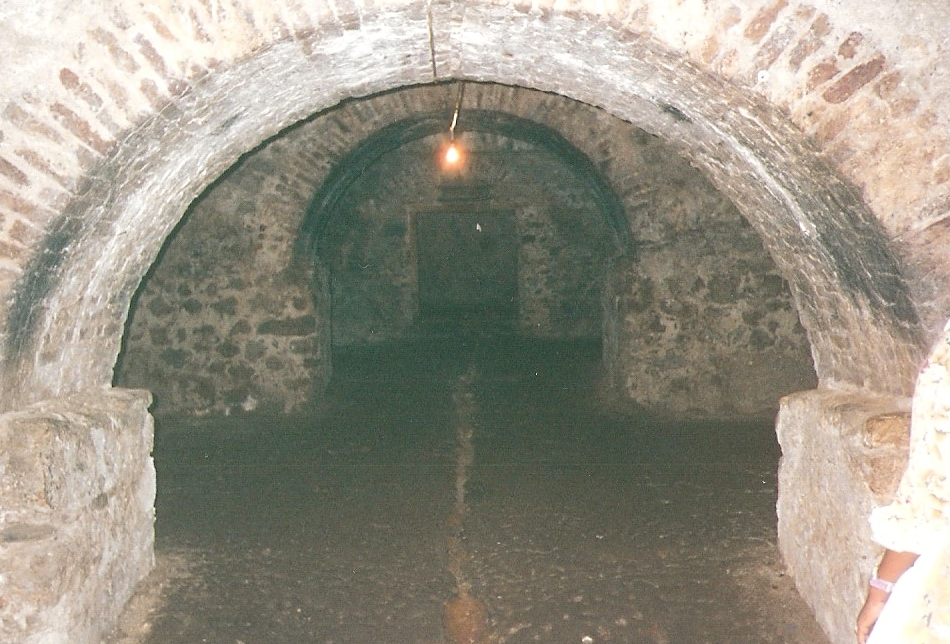
Dungeon, 1995

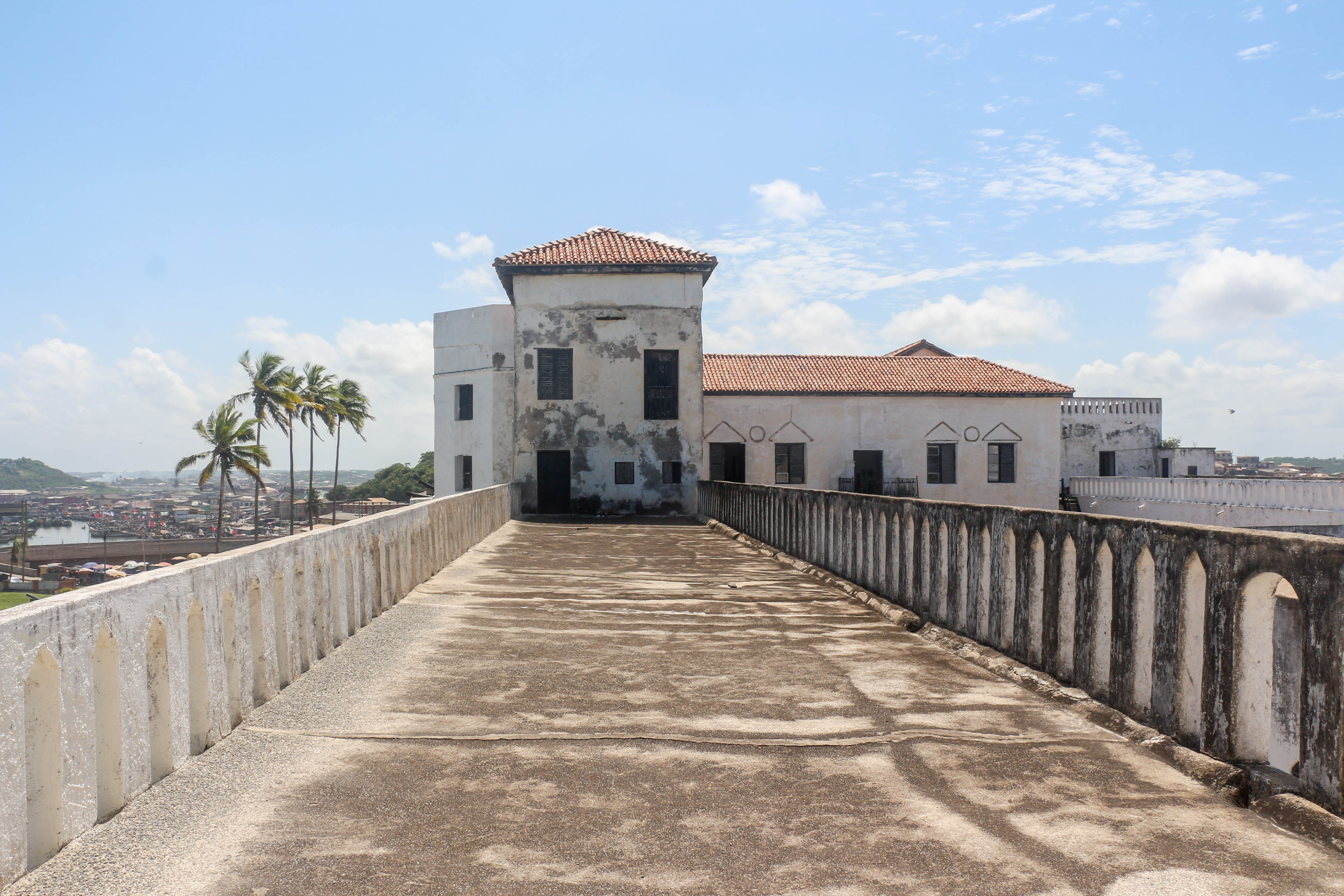
Elmina Castle

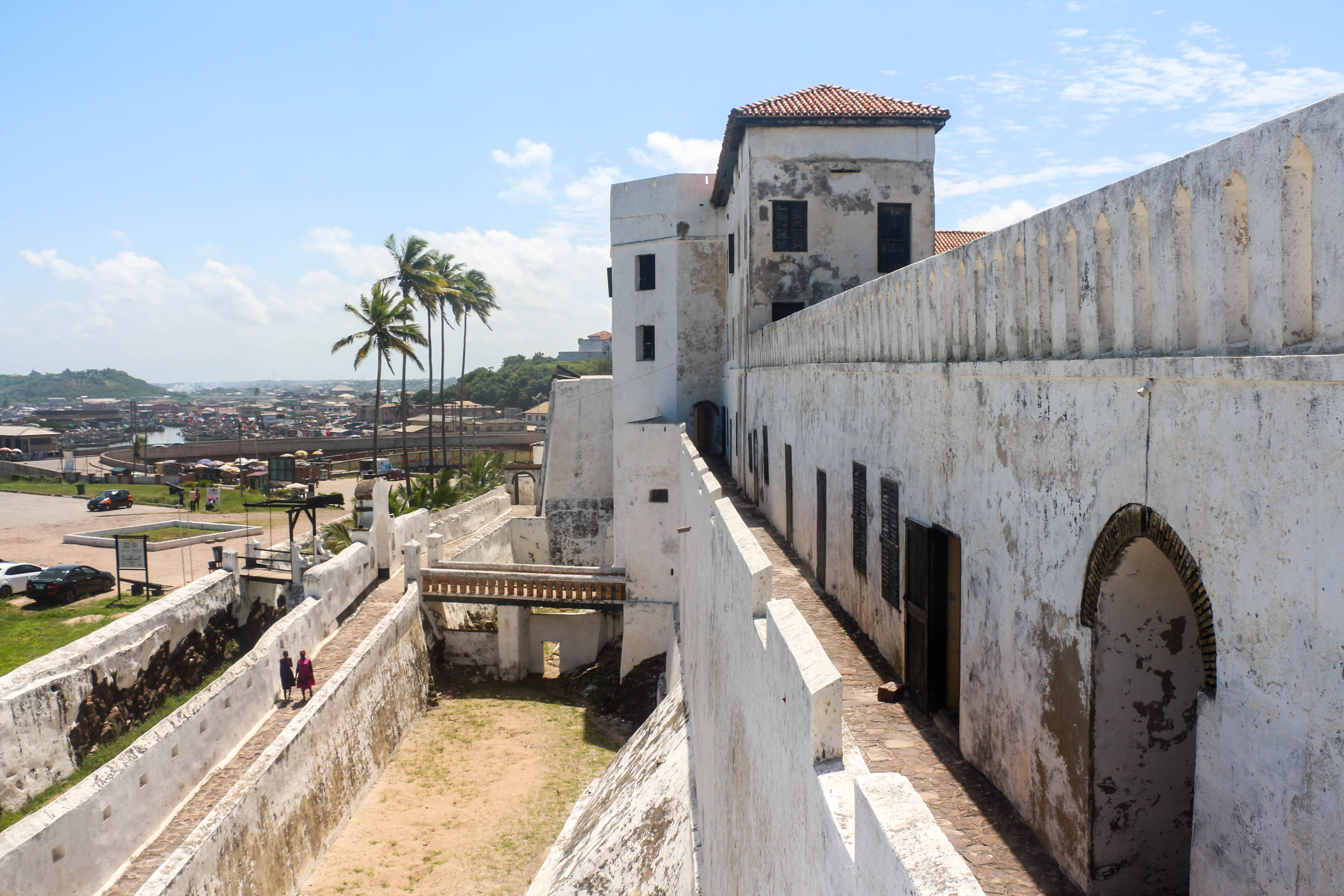
Elmina Castle

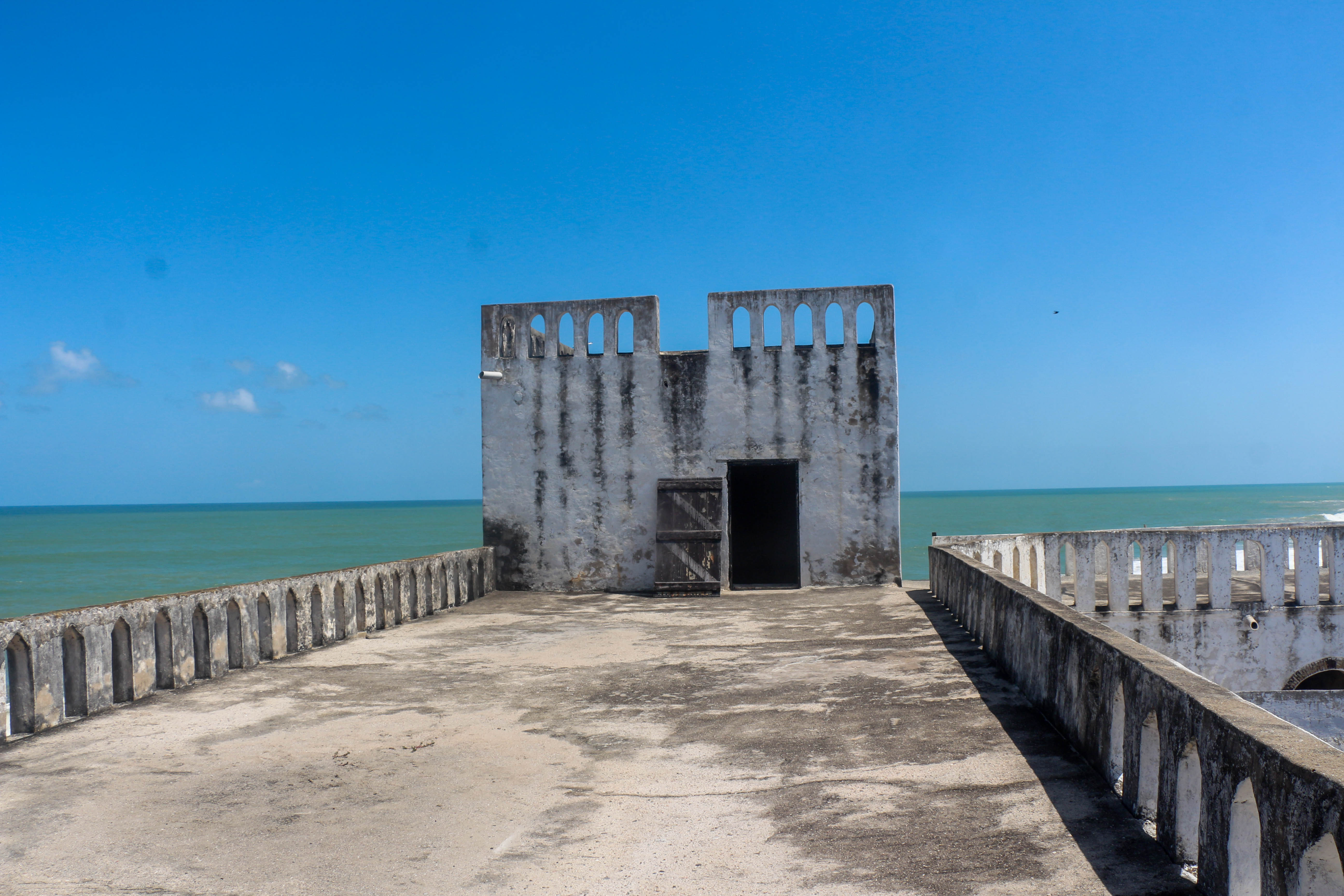
Elmina Castle

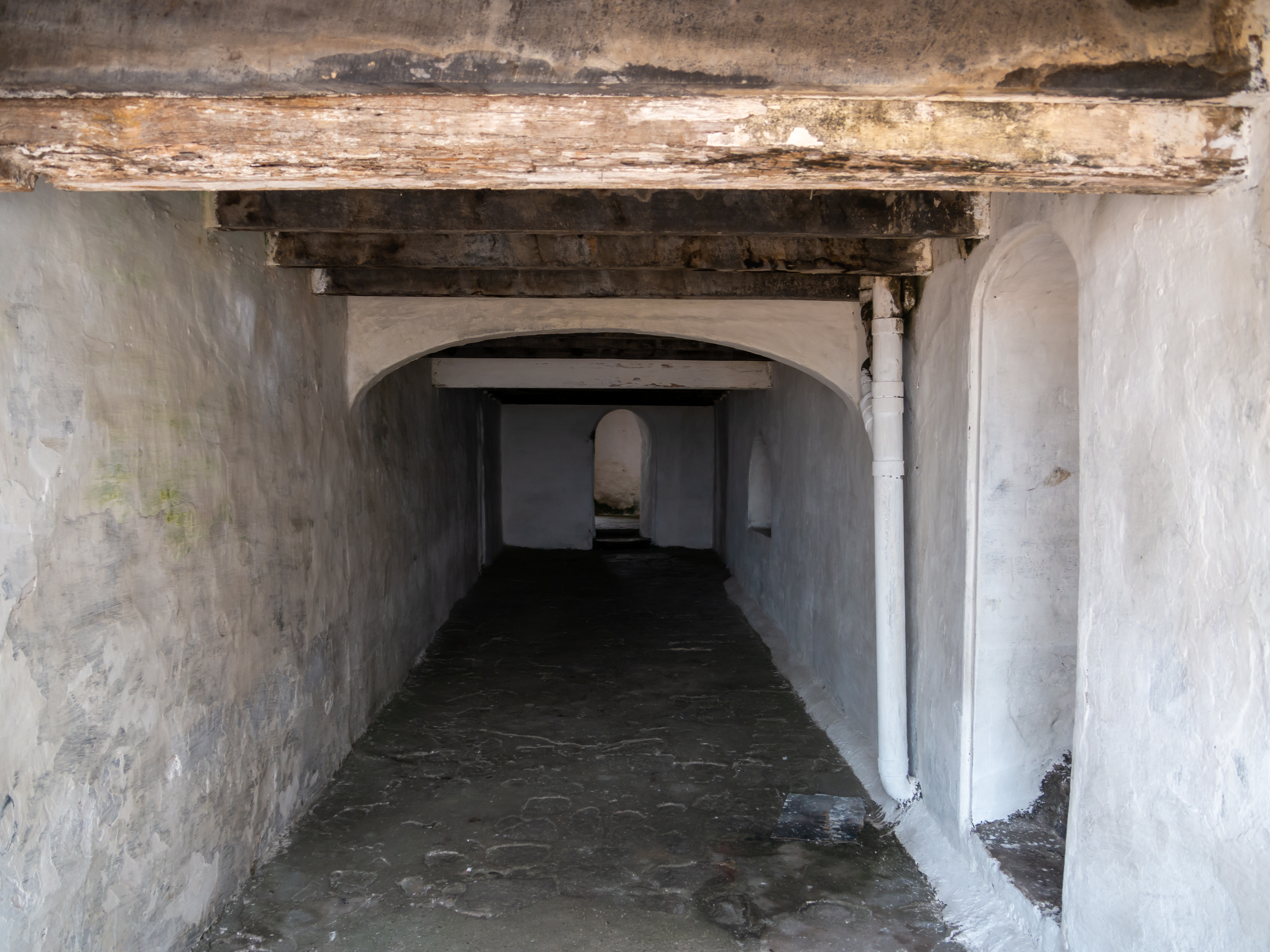
Elmina Castle

== In popular culture ==
Elmina Castle featured as a main filming location in Werner Herzog's 1987 film Cobra Verde.

Scenes from a season 6 episode of the FX series Snowfall were shot in Elmina Castle. The title of the episode, "Door of No Return", is a reference to the symbolic door that millions of Africans were pushed through when they entered a life of slavery through castles like this.

Elmina Castle also featured prominently in the 2015 Danish film Guldkysten (Gold Coast).

== Works ==
- The Two Hearts of Kwasi Boachi

== See also ==
- Diaspora tourism
- Door of Return
- List of castles in Ghana
- Year of Return, Ghana 2019
- Dutch government school of Elmina
