= Shiare =

- Town
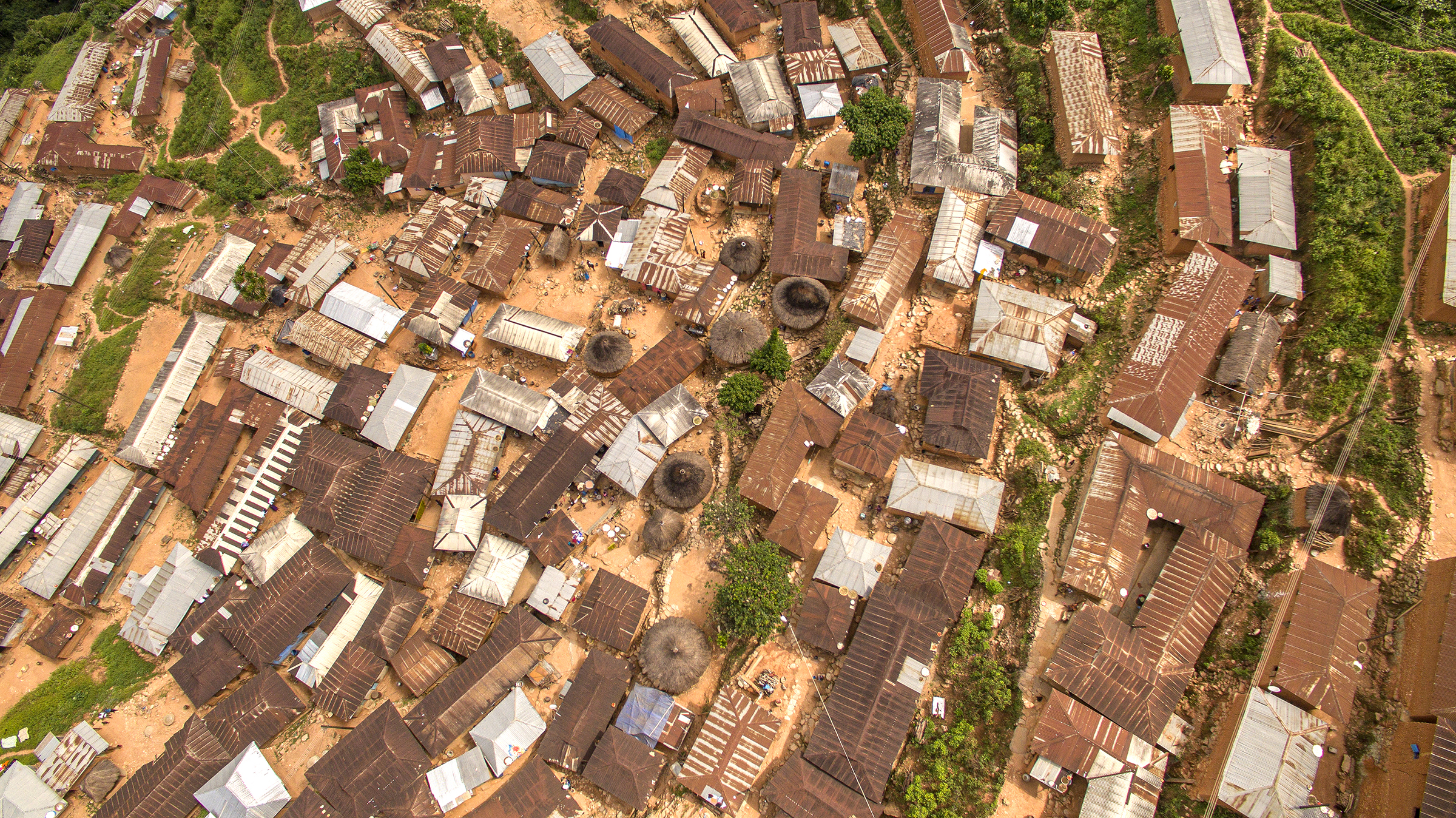

- Location of Shiare
- Coordinates: 8°18′N 0°36′E
- Country: Ghana
- Region: Oti Region, Northern Volta Region
- Time zone: GMT
  - Summer (DST): GMT

Shiare is a village mountain settlement in the Breast Mountains in the Oti region of Ghana. The Oti Region is in the northern part of the Volta Region. Shiare is a part of Nkwanta South Municipal District. It is noted that the village settlement is nine centuries old. It is north of the Oti Region in Ghana. The village is known as 'The Hanging Village'.

== History ==
Oral history says that the people of Shiare migrated from Ejisu in the Ashanti region. The Shiare village is on and around the Breast Mountains in Ghana. They practice their traditional religion. The village is believed to be 900 years old.

== Geography ==
Shiare is about a 30-minute drive from Nkwanta, Ghana.

== Economy ==
The villagers of Shiare are subsistence farmers. They grow cassava, yams, and some vegetables.

== Culture ==
The Shiare people are Guan people. Their language is Akyode. The village is over nine centuries old. Their homes are made of rocks and clay built on terraces around the Kwahu mountains. The villagers' ethnic group is the Kyode people. Their language is Guan. The chief of Shiare is called Shiare Wura or Osulewura, which means king of the Kyode kingdom. The paramount seat of the Kyode is in Shiare. Their religion is traditional religion. The Holy Family Catholic Church is the only church in the village, which was started 75 years ago.

Shiare has a waterfall which is their only source of water, which is channeled through a stream. The waterfall is about 40 minutes away from the village. Shiare's primary occupation is farming. They also produce honey.

The typical traditional food is fufu made from yams, which is pounded by two or three people working together.

The village has electricity. Shiare has no senior high schools or tertiary institutions.

== Gallery ==
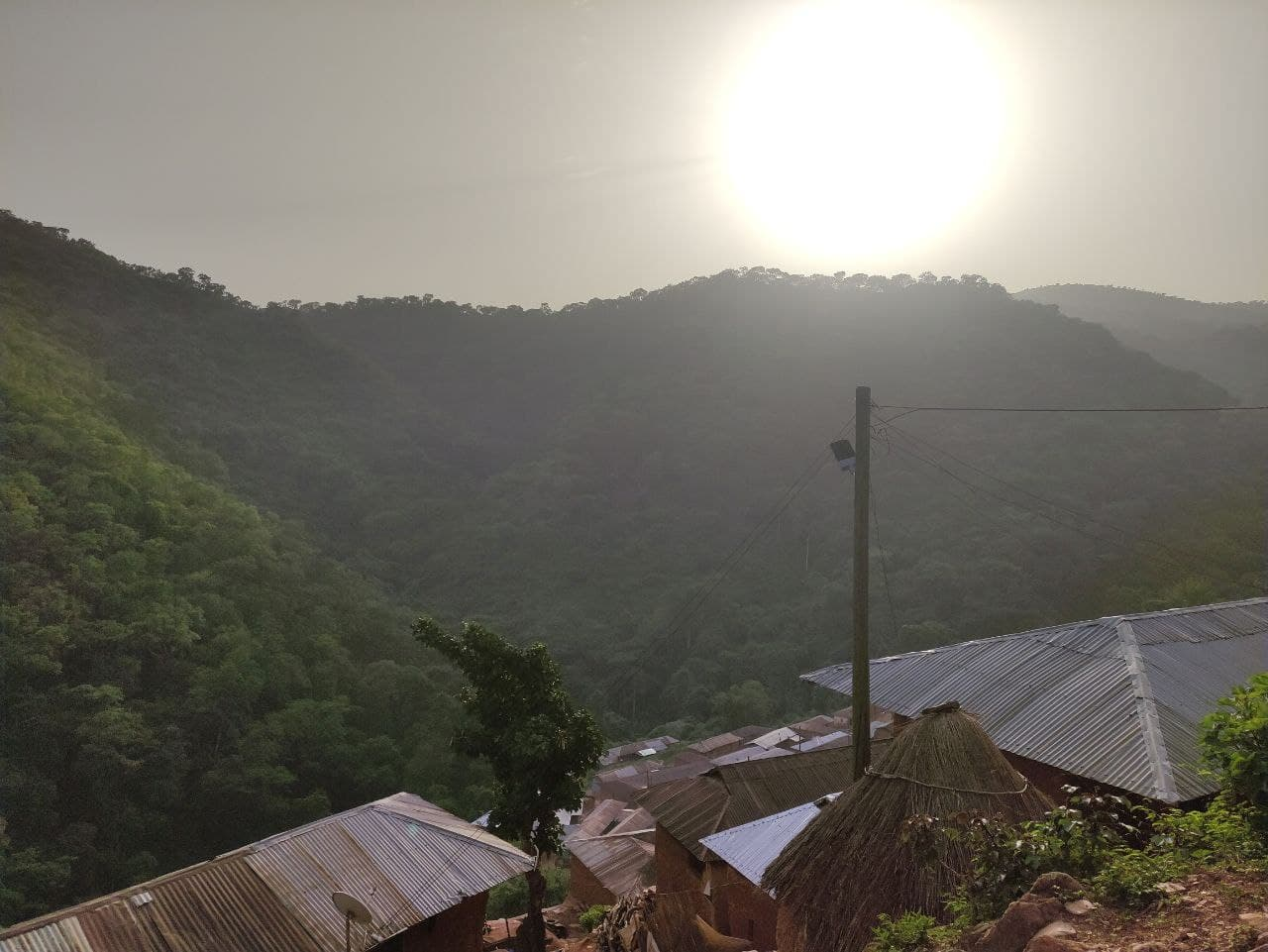

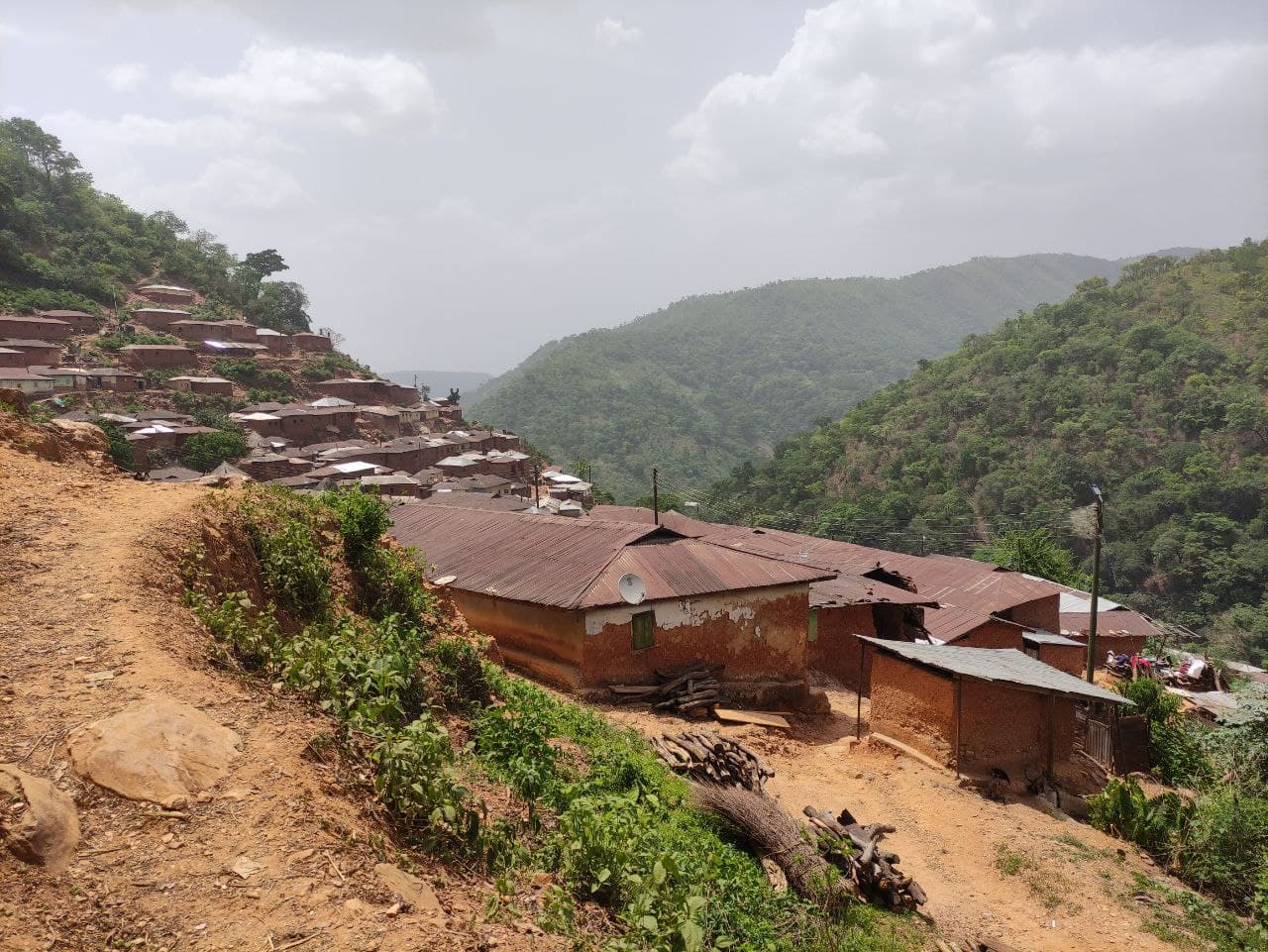

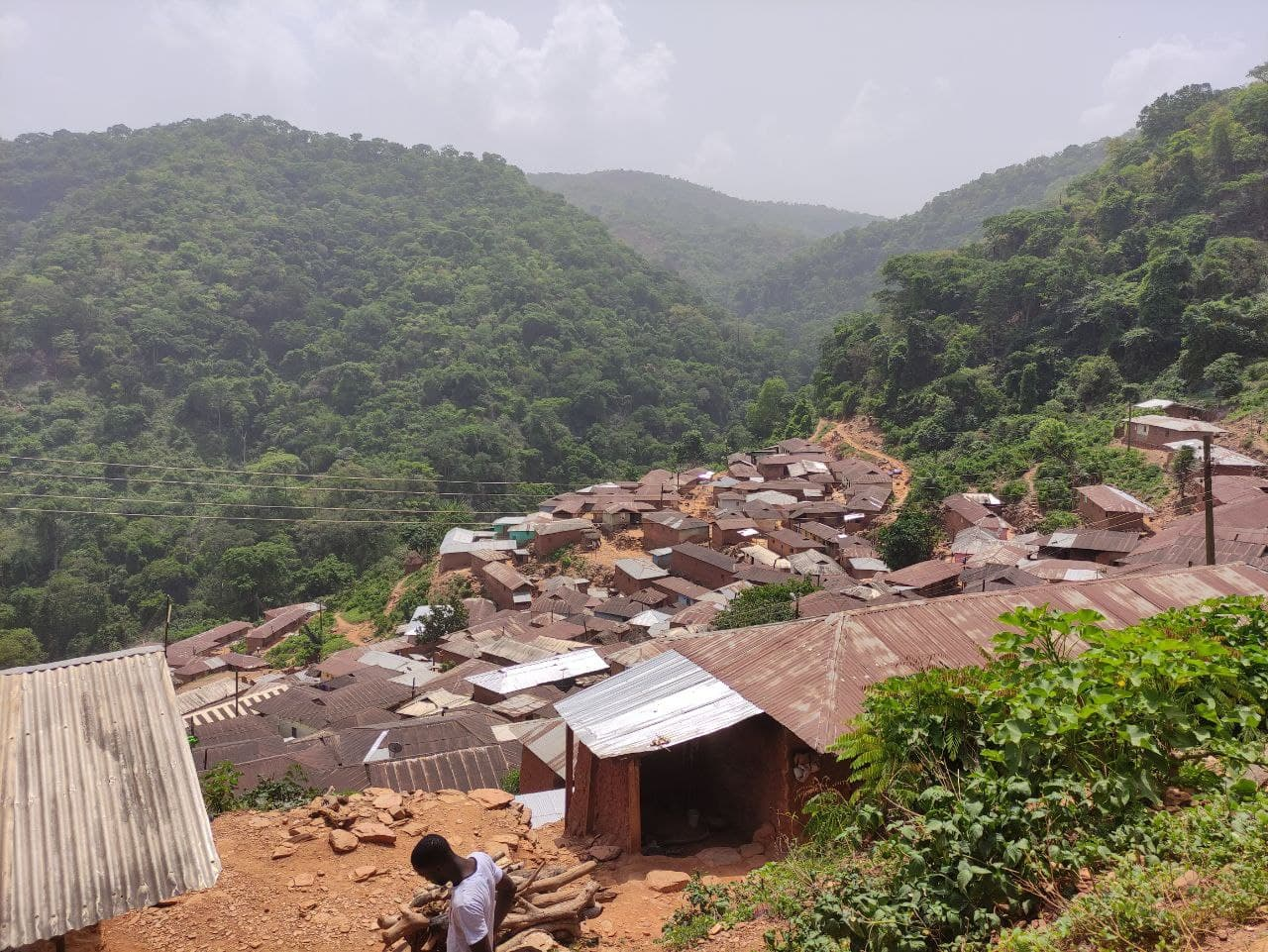

== See also ==
- Testing out Hydraulic Ram Pumps in "the Akyode Village"
- Shiare "The Hanging Village", in Ghana - full documentary
- The Hanging Village
- Shiare weather
- Shiare
- Shiare Village
- Shiare Community
- Life in Shiare
- Hanging Village Waterfall in Ghana (Shiare)
