= Nkami language =

Guang language of Ghana

Nkami
- Native to: Ghana
- Native speakers: 7,000 (2009)
- Language family: Niger–Congo?: Atlantic–Congo; Kwa; Potou–Tano; Tano; Guang; North; Nkami

Language codes
- ISO 639-3: nkq
- Glottolog: nkam1239

Nkami is a Guang language of Ghana. There is reported to be a community in Benin as well.
