= Ntrapo language =

Endangered Guang language of Ghana

Nterato
- Ntrapo
- Native to: Ghana
- Region: Kpalangase village
- Native speakers: 2 elderly speakers (2007)
- Language family: Niger–Congo?: Atlantic–Congo; Kwa; Potou–Tano; Tano; Guang; North; Nterato

Language codes
- ISO 639-3: None (mis)
- Glottolog: nter1234

- Person: bədrapʊ
- People: ntrapʊna

Nterato, or Ntrapo (ntrapʊ), is a nearly extinct Guang language of Ghana.
