= Kyode people =

Ethnic group in Ghana

AKyode, Gikyode, Akyode
Regions with significant populations
- Northern Volta basin, Oti Region, Ghana

Languages
- Akyode, French

Religion
- Islam

Related ethnic groups
- subgroup of the Guang people and the Mossi people

The Guan-speaking Gikyode. Akyode people live in the northern Volta basin in the Oti Region of Ghana, Africa. These people migrated into the Volta valley from the Mossi region of Burkina Faso around 1000 AD. The Akyode language is called Gikyode.

The Akyodes are made up of communities, Shiare, Abrewanko, Nyambong, Kyilinga, Siban, Pawa, Bonakye, Gekorong, Kanba (Abrewanko Junction), Nyakoma, Kromase, and]. The paramount seat is in Shiare. Kingship is called gewura, and is the form of leadership in these communities. Each community has a chief, or wura, who rules the town. The chief of Kromase is called kromase wura. But the chief of Shiare can be called shiare wura or osulewura.

The Akyode people are the first settlers in Nkwanta and its environment and lives around the Kyabobo Mountain. The Akyode divided themselves into groups to settle at different areas in the present Nkwanta south Municipality, Pawa,Gekorong and Keri etc . They welcomed the Challas,Adeles people and assigned them to Akyode Odomi to do their menial jobs in agriculture and hunting and the Adela’s in dadiase etc. History is told that the Challa undertook their initiation rituals under the authority of the Akyode Priest known as Sei before they are able to perform rites of the Challa deity known as Challa jogo .
