= Eguafo =

Former country in present-day Ghana

Eguafo Kingdom
- Status: Kingdom
- Capital: Eguafo
- Government: Monarchy
Succeeded by
Fante Confederacy

Eguafo was a Guan kingdom in what is now southern Ghana that existed from at least the 15th century up until its incorporation into the Fante Confederacy and then the Gold Coast (British Colony) in the 19th century. Shama and Elmina were major trading ports for Eguafo.

Eguafo fought a series of wars against the Fante Confederacy and the Fetu Kingdom in the 17th century. This culminated in the Komenda Wars of the 1690s, in which the Dutch attempted to take control of the kingdom by supporting a rival claimant to the throne. By the late 18th century the king's power had declined, and the kingdom was no longer able to control trade passing through its borders. It was conquered by the Fante in the 19th century.
