= Tchumbuli language =

Guang language of Benin

Tchumbuli
- Tshummbuli, Chombulon, Tchombolo
- Native to: Benin
- Native speakers: (2,500 cited 2000)
- Language family: Niger–Congo?: Atlantic–Congo; Kwa; Potou–Tano; Tano; Guang; North; Tchumbuli

Language codes
- ISO 639-3: bqa
- Glottolog: tchu1241
- ELP: Tchumbuli

Tchumbuli is a Guang language spoken by 2,000 to 3,000 people in Benin.
