= Ginyanga language =

Guang language spoken in Togo

Nyanga
- Ginyanga
- Native to: Togo
- Native speakers: 17,000 (2012)
- Language family: Niger–Congo?: Atlantic–Congo; Kwa; Potou–Tano; Tano; Guang; North; Nyanga

Language codes
- ISO 639-3: ayg
- Glottolog: giny1241

- People: Anyanga
- Language: Ginyanga

Nyanga (Ginyanga) is a Guang language of Togo.
