= Ohene =

American rapper

O'hene Savànt
- Also known as: The "O,"18-18, 81sunim81, Ohene
- Born: Shockley, Kawann
- Origin: Philadelphia, US
- Genres: Hip hop, jazz
- Occupations: Rapper, record producer, multi-instrumentalist
- Instruments: Vocals, keyboards, bass guitar, guitar, drums, percussion
- Years active: 1997–present
- Labels: RAHM Nation Recordings, LLC/Soul Model Recordings, LLC
- Website: ohenemusic.com

Ohene is an American hip-hop and jazz multi-instrumentalist, record producer and founder/co-owner of Soul Model Recordings, LLC.

== Early life and career ==
Kawann "Ohene" Shockley was born and raised in the North Philadelphia section of Philadelphia, Pennsylvania. He later moved with his aunt and uncle to Accra, the capital of the Republic of Ghana, West Africa, where he spent his teenage years. He recorded his first demo tape at the age of 13, which led to his first television appearance in 1997 on Smash T.V., a national television show in Ghana.

A year later, Ohene made his first major concert appearance at The Vibrant Street Carnival in Accra, with approximately 50,000 in attendance. 1998 also brought his first professional production, a Native Funk Lords track entitled "Amfuo", which received frequent airplay in Ghana.

== 2000 – 2004: Return to Philadelphia ==
Ohene returned to Philadelphia in the United States, where he established the Christian hip hop group "Exit-Us". From 2002 to 2004, he taught a course entitled "The Art of Rap: How to Emcee" at Temple University through the Pan African Studies Community Education Program.

While teaching at Temple University, Ohene wrote his first full-length album, The Rapademics, which was released in November 2004 and rereleased in January 2006. The majority of The Rapademics tracks produced by DJ DN3, with a few cuts produced by Mr. Throwdown, Greg Soundz, Jee-Eye-Zee, and Ohene himself. On this album, Ohene introduced the concept of "neo cubism," in part inspired by Picasso's Cubism, in which stereo panning creates alternate endings to the story. The Rapademics also fuses classical music with hip-hop and is the first hip-hop album to use the Waltz time signature 3/4 (nearly all hip-hop songs are in 4/4 time signature).

In addition to Temple University, Ohene has lectured at Rowan University, University of Delaware, and Virginia Tech. He is referenced in songwriter and author Cynthia Bigg's "The Poetic Cries of the Impoverished", which was published in 2009. Ohene also met rap artist Christopher "Play" Martin of the rap duo Kid 'n Play. Martin still aids him as a career consultant since their initial meeting in 2004.

== 2006: Inner City Soul ==
Leaving Temple University to focus solely on music, Ohene released his second album, Inner City Soul in July 2006. This time, Ohene handled most of the production himself (with one contribution each from Rapademics producers Mr. Throwdown and DJ DN3). Inner City Soul represented a shift from his first album, mixing doo-wop and rap, with the lyrical focus being more spiritual and political. Surpassing the critical acclaim of The Rapademics, Inner City Soul was touted as one of 2007's best albums by Hip Hop Linguistics. In 2006 he met musician and producer Dexter Wansel as well as R & B/Soul singer-songwriter William Hart of the Philadelphia singing group The Delfonics. Both of these musicians currently serve as mentors and advisers for Ohene.

== 2007: Mysterion 7, Nina Simone by...Ohene ==
Ohene released the themed EP Mysterion 7 on July 7, 2007. It was available for seven days, selling for $7.07, containing seven songs (the last of which ended at the seventh minute), and explored the numerology of the number seven.

2007 also saw Ohene's third full-length studio album, Nina Simone by ... Ohene. A tribute to the works and life of Nina Simone, written and produced solely by Ohene, each song represents a hip-hop reimagination of a Nina Simone's originals with slight variations in subject matter. The album ends with the track "Nina Simone By O (Bio)," an audio biography of Simone, including her discography.

After being urged to review Mysterion 7 and Nina Simone by ... Ohene by his students, Princeton University professor and social commentator Dr. Cornel West referred to Ohene's work as "genius."

== 2008 – 2010: Between Releases ==
In 2008, Ohene returned to Ghana, West Africa to showcase his talents as part of the Bob Marley 61st Anniversary Birthday Show. He also released the instrumental jazz album Without Words, which led to an introduction to legendary producer James Mtume, who now serves as Ohene's manager and mentor. That same year, Ohene began working on a new album, to be executively produced by Mtume, that promised another reinvention of Ohene's production and songwriting. This highly anticipated album will feature such greats as Tawatha Agee (lead singer of the legendary R & B group "Mtume") and Miles Davis' lone protégé trumpeter Wallace Roney. In 2009, a life-threatening car accident while on the way to meet Mtume at Kiss FM in New York delayed the album's release.

While continuing to work on his own music, Ohene also served as the main producer for jazz legend Jimmy Heath's Big Band/Hip Hop Fusion album. Heath mentions Ohene in his book "I Walked With Giants: The Autobiography of Jimmy Heath", which was released in 2010.

From 2008 to 2009, Ohene toured with Jazz/gospel harpist Jeff Majors in promotion of the compilation album Sacred Eight. Ohene produced and wrote "Trying Times" for the album, which peaked at 15 on the Billboard Gospel Charts. Ohene performed "Trying Times" on TV One's "The Gospel of Music with Jeff Majors."

== 2011–present: I Am Ohene ==
In 2011, Ohene released his fourth solo album, I Am Ohene, self-produced with all live and synthesized instruments (no samples) played by Ohene himself, featuring time signature changes and distinct movements on each track. That same year, he also released the house music album The House That O Built under his new moniker O'hene Savànt. In 2012, O'hene surprised fans with the unscheduled release of a twelve track EP, The Unknown. He announce via Facebook that his self-titled fifth studio solo album is due out early 2013 with planned features by Big Daddy Kane and Meshell Ndegeocello.

== Discography ==
- 2004, 2006 – The Rapademics (RAHM Nation Recordings, LLC)
- 2006 – Inner City Soul (RAHM Nation Recordings, LLC)
- 2007 – Mysterion 7 (RAHM Nation Recordings, LLC)
- 2007 – Nina Simone by ... Ohene (RAHM Nation Recordings, LLC)
- 2008 – Without Words (RAHM Nation Recordings, LLC)
- 2011 – I Am Ohene (Soul Model Recordings, LLC)
- 2011 – The House That O Built (Soul Model Recordings, LLC)
- 2011 – Rapsploitation Mixtape (Soul Model Recordings, LLC)
- 2012 – Illuminated (Soul Model Recordings, LLC)
- 2012 – The Unknown (Soul Model Recordings, LLC)
- 2014 – Os The Great & Powerful (Soul Model Recordings, LLC)
- 2014 – Pisces (Ohene Savant Multimedia)
- 2014 – The Jimmy Lee Watson Tapes (Ohene Savant Multimedia)
- 2015 – Raptones (Ohene Savant Multimedia)
- 2015 – O'hene Savánt (pronounced "Oh-Hen-Knee") (Ohene Savant Multimedia)
- 2016 – 1st Millennial (Ohene Savant Multimedia)
- 2016 – A Lack of Convention (Ohene Savant Multimedia)
- 2016 – Piano Werkz (Ohene Savant Multimedia)
- 2018 – B/aQ Majik 1 (Ohene Savant Multimedia)
- 2018 – B/aQ Majik 2 (Ohene Savant Multimedia)
- 2018 – Savánt Syndrome (Ohene Savant Multimedia)
- 2018 – AFOIE (Ohene Savant Multimedia)
- 2020 – Eyekonoklazm: The Final Chapter (Ohene Savant Multimedia)
- 2020 – OStalgia (Ohene Savant Multimedia)
- 2020 – Art Rap (Ohene Savant Multimedia)
- 2020 – O'Savant (Ohene Savant Multimedia)
- 2020 – Sky Tears: Lo-fi by O'hene Savant (Ohene Savant Multimedia)
- 2020 – Rappestry Moonlight (Ohene Savant Multimedia)
- 2020 – Mynor Adjustments (Ohene Savant Multimedia)

Featured:

- 2005 – "Bang, Bang" on Guerrillas in the Mixx, Vol. 1 (Backbone Records)
- 2005 – "Childhood Development" & "Martyr" on The Chancellor (RAHM Nation Recordings, LLC)
- 2006 – "Art of War" on The Call (RAHM Nation Recordings, LLC)
- 2007 – "Gnosis" & "Faculty Meeting" on Legend of ... The Chancellor (RAHM Nation Recordings, LLC)
- 2008 – "Fly (Remix)" on The 8th Day (RAHM Nation Recordings, LLC)
- 2008 – "Gods Among Men" on American Scholar (RAHM Nation Recordings, LLC)
- 2009 – "Trying Times" on Sacred Eight (Music One)
- 2010 – "To Whom Much Is Given" on Back and Forth (Koyto Mixtapes)
- 2011 – "Kick" on San Diego (Suxxess Records)
- 2012 – "Small" on Knowing (Suxxess Records)
- 2012 – "Superficial Girl" on Fail Mixtape (AllHipHop.com)

Production Credits:

- 2004 – "Waltz in 'O' Minor" on The Rapademics (RAHM Nation Recordings, LLC)
- 2005 – "Fallen Part Two," "Double Meaning" & "Random Thoughts" on The Chancellor (RAHM Nation Recordings, LLC)
- 2006 – "On The Grind (Mama Told Me)" & "I Still Care" on The Call (RAHM Nation Recordings, LLC)
- 2006 – All Tracks except "Kennedy" & "We The People" Inner City Soul (RAHM Nation Recordings, LLC)
- 2007 – "Gnosis," "Fallen (Suicide)," "Faculty Meeting," "Double Meaning" & "Conclusion?" on Legend of ... The Chancellor (RAHM Nation Recordings, LLC)
- 2007 – "18-18," "Humble Resistance," & "Born Again" on Mysterion 7 (RAHM Nation Recordings, LLC)
- 2007 – All Tracks Nina Simone by ... Ohene (RAHM Nation Recordings, LLC)
- 2007 – "More to Give" on Crime & Consequences (Cross Movement Records)
- 2008 – "Playoff Beard" and "I Know U Heard" on American Scholar (RAHM Nation Recordings, LLC)
- 2009 – "Trying Times" on Sacred Eight (Music One)
- 2010 – "David's Song," "I Could Have Been," "Sufficient," "Script Hop," "Live It Up," & "Lord I Remember" on St. Fallible (Soul Model Records, LLC)
- 2011 – All Tracks I Am Ohene (Soul Model Recordings, LLC)
- 2011 – All Tracks The House That O Built (Soul Model Recordings, LLC)
- 2012 – "2Pac is #DEAD," "Savantism," "In the Light," "Choice," "Purpose," and "Unknown Outro" on The Unknown (Soul Model Recordings, LLC)
