= Efutu people =

Ethnic group in Ghana

Efutu, Awutu, Simpafo
Regions with significant populations
- Awutu, Adina, Senya-Beraku and Winneba in Central Region, Ghana

Languages
- Efutu, Akan, French

Religion
- Christianity, Islam

Related ethnic groups
- subgroup of the Guang people and the Akan people

The Efutu (also called Awutu or Simpafo) are a part of the Guang people who are historically known to be the aboriginal inhabitants of present-day Ghana. The Efutu, who are a primarily fishing-based population, founded the coastal area in about 1390 C.E. They are generally found in Awutu Senya, Adina, Senya Beraku and Winneba (originally named Simpa). Their Guan culture has influenced neighbouring Akan communities. Historically, the Akan people, especially the Borbor Mfantsefo, adopted several cultural elements from the Efutu, such as traditional denominations. The integration of these practices led to the formation of a modern culture shared by both the Guan people of Winneba and their Akan neighbours. The Simpa Kingdom was formed about 1400 AD.

One of the most well-known kings of the Efutu people is Omanhene Nana Kwasi Gyan Ghartey I (1666–1712), who was the first monarch to bear the Akan Omanhene title. He was known for his engagement with fishing, as well as for having as many as twelve wives and more than six children with each of them. Ghartey I contributed to the town's development by constructing infrastructure, namely a police station, a secondary school, and other major buildings.

The Efutu people speak the Efutu dialect of the Awutu language.

== Communities ==
The Efutu, like other Guan states, follow a patrilineal system of succession. The male line of the siblings and sons are called the Prama, which are male family houses in which meetings are held.

A typical Efutu native must hail from one of the original paternal houses (Prama). It has approximately sixteen rural communities, most of them established as a result of farming, including: Ekoroful, Ansaful, Ateitu, Gyatakrom, Dawuro Prama, Saakoodo, Nsuekyire, Gyahadze, Gyangyanadze, Sankoro, Tuansa, Kojo Beedu, Atekyedo, Osubonpanyin, New Winneba, New Ateitu.

== Akumesi and Aboakyer festivals ==
The Efutu celebrate the Akumesi Festival (with the exception of Winneba which celebrates the Aboakyir Festival). The Akumesi Festival, which is similar to the Homowo of the Ga-Adangmes, is celebrated to hoot at hunger.

The Aboakyer festival is a bushbuck hunting festival celebrated by the people of Winneba in the Central Region of Ghana. The name Aboakyer translates as ‘hunting for game or animal’ in Fante dialect as spoken by the people of the Central Region. The inauguration of the festival served to commemorate the migration of the Simpafo (the aboriginal name of the inhabitants of Winneba). The people hold the belief that a god, whom they called Penkye Otu, had protected them during their migration to Winneba, therefore, to show their appreciation, it is custom to consult an intermediary between the people and the divinity (generally a traditional priest) to ask the god for its preferred sacrifice. Local history claims that Penkye Otu asked for a human sacrifice, in particular, a member of the royal family. The tradition of human sacrifices was later forsaken after several years of practice, and as a result, an offer was made to the god to change the sacrifice, due to fears that the sacrifices made would eventually erase the lineage of the ruling family. Penkye Otu thus requested that every year, a leopard be caught alive, presented at the shrine before beheading it as a sacrifice. However, due to the large amount of injury-related incidents resulting from the leopard hunt and live capture, the main event of the festival was changed to bushbuck hunting.

=== Game Hunting ===
The game hunting begins with two Asafo warrior groups, Tuafo and Dentsefo. One week prior to the Aboakyer festival, both the Tuafo and the Dentsefo parade their gods. On the day of the game hunting ceremony, the two Asafo groups participate in a hunt for the bushbuck antelope in a designated forest. At the end of the hunt, the paramount chief and his subordinates then move to the Durbar grounds to receive and award the first Asafo group to successfully capture a bushbuck antelope.

== Sources ==
- Meyerowitz, Eva L. R. "A Note on the Origins of Ghana." African Affairs 51.205 (1952): 319–23.
