= Kyode language =

Guang language of Ghana

Kyode
- Gikyode
- Native to: Ghana
- Ethnicity: Atwode
- Native speakers: 10,400 (2003)
- Language family: Niger–Congo?: Atlantic–Congo; Kwa; Potou–Tano; Tano; Guang; North; Kyode

Language codes
- ISO 639-3: acd
- Glottolog: giky1238

- People: Achode
- Language: Gikyode

Kyode (Gikyode, Chode) is a Guang language of Ghana. It is spoken in the Nkwanta area. The seat of the paramount chief is Shiare.
