= Guang languages =

Language family

Guang
- Geographic distribution: Ghana, Togo
- Ethnicity: Guang people
- Linguistic classification: Niger–Congo?: Atlantic–Congo; Kwa; Potou–Tano; Tano; Guang
- Subdivisions: North; South

Language codes
- Glottolog: guan1278

The Guang languages are languages of the Kwa language family spoken by the Guang people in Ghana and Togo:

- Southern Guang
  - Efutu-Awutu
  - Hill Guang: dialects Cherepon, Gua (Gwa), Larteh
- Northern Guang: dialects Anii, Chumburung–Tchumbuli, Dwang, Foodo, Kyode, Ginyanga, Gonja, Kplang, Krache, Nawuri, Nchumbulu, Nkonya–Nkami, Ntrapo, Vagala

== History of Guan ==
Ethnologue and Glottolog also list Dompo, but according to Blench (1999), that is better left unclassified.

Proto-Guang has been reconstructed by Snider (1990).

== See also ==
- List of Proto-Guang reconstructions (Wiktionary)
