= Awutu language =

Guang language spoken in Ghana

Awutu
- Efutu
- Native to: Ghana
- Ethnicity: Efutu
- Native speakers: 180,000 (2003)
- Language family: Niger–Congo?: Atlantic–Congo; Volta–Congo; Kwa; Potou–Tano; Tano; Guang; South Guang; Awutu
- Dialects: Awutu; Efutu; Senya

Language codes
- ISO 639-3: afu
- Glottolog: awut1241
- ELP: Effutu

Awutu is a Guang language spoken by 180,000 in coastal Ghana.

Awutu is the principal dialect. The other two are Efutu and Senya.
