= Guan people =

Ethnic group in Northern Ghana

Guan
Total population
- ~1,000,000

Regions with significant populations
- Ghana: ~1,000,000

Languages
- Guan, English

Religion
- Christianity; Islam; Traditional

Related ethnic groups
- Gonja; Other Guan peoples

The Guan people are an ethnic group found almost in all parts of Ghana, including the Akyode people who speak Gikyode, Anii, Krachi people Nkonya tribe, the Akpana/Logba people who speak Ikpana, the Gonja, Anum, Larteh, Akposo, Etsii in the Central Region, Nawuri, Nyagbo and Ntsumburu. The Guan are believed to have been the first settlers in modern-day southern Ghana, migrating from the Mossi-Dagbon region of modern Ghana and Burkina around 1000 A.D. The Gonja of the Guan are, however, late settlers in northern Ghana, invading eastern Dagbon in the 1600s, capturing Daboya and many towns.

They primarily speak the Guan languages of the Niger-Congo language family. They make up 3.7% of the population of Ghana.

However, some of the Guan languages have been influenced by major languages especially the Anii-Basila in Ghana, depending also on the location of a particular Guan tribe. Guans can be found in the Eastern region, which includes Anum, Makɔ who once spoke Anii, Boso, Larteh, Okere, and Kyerepong. Guan in the Oti Region include the Akyode, Krachi, Buem, Nkonya, Likpe, Santrokofi, and Akpafu. Guan in the Volta Region include the Avatime, Logba, Nyagbo, and Tafi. In the central region are the Efutu, Awutu-Senya, Bawjiase as well as the Etsii groups who now form an arm of the modern Fante Confederacy. The Gonja people are in the north and part of Brong Ahafo, Bono and Ahafo. The Nawuri people live in parts of the North and parts of the Oti Region, mostly at the eastern end of the Salaga district, on the west bank of the Volta Lake/Oti River, some 70 kilometers north of Kete Krachi.

As Guan were the first settlers in Ghana, some were assimilated into the cultures of the major ethnic groups in the various regions of today. Thus, indigenes of Kpeshie in Greater Accra, Nzema, Sefwi, and Ahanta in the Western and Western North region also trace their roots to Guan people. The indigenes of most of the Fantes in the central region, including Asebu, Edina (Elmina), Shama, Oguaa (Cape Coast), Aguafo, Assin, and Agona, can also trace their origins from Guan. These Guan groups are mostly referred to as "Etsii". At present it is accepted that the Guan people can be found in twelve regions in Ghana: Oti, Northern, North East, Savannah, Bono, Ahafo, Central, Western North, Western, Eastern, Volta, and Brong Ahafo Regions. They are very tolerant and live as commoners in their various environments. They speak the languages of the major ethnic group where they are found natively, and speak their distinct languages at home.

== Origins ==
The Guans originated from the savanna regions of Ghana and Burkina Faso. These regions are inhabited by the Mossi-Dagbon people.

== Notable people ==
The following individuals of Guan descent or affiliation have made significant contributions to Ghana and beyond:

- Okomfo Anokye – 17th-century spiritual leader, priest, and lawgiver of the Ashanti Empire; co-founder of the empire and associated with many of its sacred symbols
- Kwaw Ansah – filmmaker, producer, and cultural advocate; known for African cinema classics such as Heritage Africa
- Kow Nkensen Arkaah – former vice president of Ghana (1993–1997)
- Obed Yao Asamoah – Ghana’s longest-serving minister for Foreign Affairs, later minister of justice and attorney general
- Melody Millicent Danquah – Ghana's first female pilot; a pioneer for women in the military and aviation sector
- Otiko Afisa Djaba – former minister for Gender, Children and Social Protection
- John Dumelo – actor, entrepreneur, and politician
- Constance Edjeani-Afenu – Ghana’s first female brigadier general; notable for her leadership in the Ghana Armed Forces and her peacekeeping efforts
- Michael Essien – former international footballer
- Clemence Jackson Honyenuga – Supreme Court justice and former Court of Appeal judge
- John Jinapor – politician and energy expert
- Hannah Kudjoe – prominent political activist during Ghana’s independence struggle
- Ibrahim Mahama – business magnate and founder of Engineers & Planners
- John Dramani Mahama – president of Ghana (2012–2016; re-elected in 2024); also served as vice president and member of Parliament
- Letitia Obeng – first Ghanaian woman to earn a doctorate in science (zoology); first female president of the Ghana Academy of Arts and Sciences
- Theodosia Salome Okoh – designer of the national flag of Ghana
- Alex Quaison-Sackey – Ghanaian diplomat, first Black African to serve as president of the United Nations General Assembly in 1964
- Gertrude Torkornoo – chief justice of Ghana (appointed in 2023); third woman to hold the position; a leading reformer in the judiciary
