= Kingdom of Aowin =

Former Akan state, ca. 15th–19th century

Aowin State Ebrosa
- 15th-16th century–19th century
- Status: Former kingdom
- Capital: Enchi
- Common languages: Abron; Anyin; Twi; Sefwi dialects
- Religion: Akan religion
- Government: Monarchy
- Omanhene
- History
  - Establishment as dominant gold trading state: 15th-16th century
  - Subjugation by Denkyira: Late 17th century
  - Repelled Asante invasion: 1715
  - Defeat by Asante and Wiawso allies: 1722
  - Disestablished: 19th century
- Currency: Gold dust, Cowries
Preceded by	Succeeded by
Bonoman	Aowin (municipal district); Comoé District
- Today part of: Ghana; Ivory Coast

Aowin (also known as Ebrosa, and today identified with the Agni of Ivory Coast) was one of the earliest and most powerful Akan states, rivaling Denkyira and Akwamu in regional dominance. Emerging as a gold-rich kingdom in the southwestern forests of present-day Ghana, Aowin commanded strategic trade routes connecting the inland Savannah to coastal markets. Long before the rise of Denkyira, Aowin stood as the principal power in the west, shaping commerce, migration, and state formation across the forest frontier.

== History ==
=== Origins and Rise ===
Aowin oral traditions trace their origins to the north, likely linked to broader Bonoman migration patterns—the earliest phase of centralized Akan state formation in the forest–savannah transition zone. Regional oral histories identify the Aowin as one of the first gold-producing Akan groups to establish a lasting presence in the southwestern forests of present-day Ghana. Their migration followed key river corridors, especially the Tano River, eventually settling between the Tano and Bia River—a region rich in alluvial gold and forest resources. According to tradition, the Aowin ancestors migrated from Takyiman, particularly the Sessiman area, due to political instability and northern threats from the Dagomba and Mamprussi. They first settled near the Offin River before moving southwest toward the Bia basin. Groups like the Sahié (Sefwi) Wiawso are also said to originate from Assakyiri, the same locality as the Aowin.

By the 16th century, Aowin had consolidated into a powerful state, leveraging its control of inland goldfields and dominating long-distance trade routes stretching northward to Begho and southward to Fort Apollonia and the emerging Atlantic trading forts. This strategic location enabled the Aowin to serve as a key intermediary between savannah-based markets, such as Gonja and Bouna, and coastal trading posts operated by Portuguese and later Dutch merchants.

Their commercial prominence was reinforced by a decentralized yet highly coordinated political structure, where local chiefs retained autonomy but pledged ritual allegiance to the paramount ruler, or Omanhene, seated in Enchi. This allowed Aowin to accommodate incoming populations and expand territorially without centralizing power to the extent seen in later Akan states like Denkyira or Asante.

Furthermore, archaeological traces and oral memory suggest that the Aowin were among the earliest Akan groups to develop military institutions capable of defending trade corridors and tributary settlements. Their interactions with groups such as the Nzema, Wassa, and Sefwi reflect both conflict and cultural diffusion. The early prominence of Aowin helped lay the foundations for later Agni (Anyi) polities in Ivory Coast, as displaced Aowin elites and followers migrated westward after 1721 and carried with them the institutional models forged in this formative era.

=== Conflicts and Fragmentation ===
During the late 17th century, the Aowin kingdom came under increasing pressure from the expansionist Denkyira Empire, which sought to dominate the western forest frontier and control gold-rich territories. Around 1677, Aowin forces were defeated near the Offin River by Denkyira's general, Agya Ananse Obooman, who exploited internal divisions among Aowin military factions. The defeat reduced Aowin to a vassal state. In the same period, other Akan polities—including Sahié Wenchiman, Sahié of Wiawso, Asin, and Twifo—were also conquered, between 1680 and 1696.

Despite the incursion, Aowin retained partial autonomy and became a refuge for displaced populations from Bono, Adansi, and Denkyira itself. A decisive shift occurred in 1715 when the Asante Empire, under General Amankwatia and aided by the rising Sefwi Wiawso polity, launched a successful invasion that resulted in Aowin's military defeat, territorial losses, and tributary subjugation. This marked the beginning of fragmentation and political decline across the western forest zone.

Nevertheless, Aowin's cultural legacy endured. Many Sefwi people, themselves migrants from Bono and Adansi, settled in the area and adopted its political structures, spiritual customs, and language. The collapse of central authority also spurred a major wave of westward migration into southeastern Ivory Coast, where displaced elites and affiliated groups contributed to the foundation of successor states such as Moronou, Indénié, and Sanwi.

== Migration and the Rise of Successor States ==
The fragmentation of Aowin authority following its defeat by the Asante Empire in 1715 triggered a large-scale westward migration of royal lineages, military elites, and affiliated clans. These displaced groups—originating from Aowin's core territories between the Tano River and Bia River—established new polities in the forested hinterlands of present-day southeastern Ivory Coast. Known collectively as the Anyi (Agni) kingdoms, these successor states preserved key elements of Aowin governance, ritual institutions, and language while adapting to new sociopolitical contexts.

Oral and archaeological evidence suggests that the Bettie, Sohie, and Alangwa clans—distinct subgroups within the Aowin polity—played central roles in the diaspora. Migrants moved in waves, first settling in forest zones like Kónvi Ande, before diverging westward. The Bettie were the first to break away, followed later by the Ashũa. Despite ethnic differences, these groups retained a shared memory of Anyãnyã, their ancestral settlement, and reconstituted their identities around a common Aowin heritage.

=== Moronou ===
The first major polity to emerge from this diaspora was Moronou, founded by Dangui Kpangni, a nephew of the Aowin king Ano Assinman. Leading a coalition of Aowin exiles, Sefwi (Sahié), and Ashanti auxiliaries, Kpangni established a confederated settlement in Elubo, a gold-rich forest zone west of the Tanoé river. This polity, referred to in oral traditions as the Kingdom of Moronou, was organized around seven constituent lineages and incorporated sacred Aowin regalia, including the royal stool of Ano Assinman. Each group was assigned territorial and defensive roles within a decentralized hierarchy. Although the state was briefly cohesive, it collapsed following the Agni–Baoulé War of 1780, which resulted in the death of Kpangni and the dispersal of his coalition.

=== Sanwi ===
Sanwi one of the most prominent successor states, established further south with its capital at Krinjabo (Kèlènjɩabu). Founded by Aowin–Anyi elites, including Amon N’Dufu and the royal envoy Aniaba, Sanwi integrated conquered territories such as Asini and the surrounding coast. It quickly emerged as a highly centralized polity with an effective military structure, matrilineal governance, and symbolic legitimacy rooted in its Aowin heritage. Sanwi engaged in diplomatic relations with the French as early as 1701, and by the mid-18th century, its rulers had signed multiple treaties to protect trade and assert regional authority.

According to oral tradition and Henriette Diabaté's research, Sanwi's royal house traces direct descent from Aowin, particularly from Ano Asemã (or Ano Asinman), a renowned ruler of Enchi. The legitimacy of Sanwi kingship was reinforced by the bènganm drum, said to have been carved from the same tree as the Aowin drum. Diabaté notes that the Sanwi version came from the upper part, while the Aowin drum in Yakassé was taken from the lower, more sacred section—symbolizing Sanwi's subordinate status relative to Aowin's elder lineage. Sanwi's centralization mirrored Aowin's legacy but was adapted to a militarized context, with structured asafo (sahinnan) roles and later efforts to place Oyoko-affiliated royals in leadership above the military.

Diabaté argues that this symbolic and political subordination to Aowin was not only affirmed through regalia but institutionalized through ancestral ideology. Both Sanwi and Aowin elites were linked to the Oyoko clan, aligning Sanwi's royal identity with that of the Asante sovereigns. However, this affiliation was contested—some oral accounts instead trace Sanwi's rulers to the Aduana clan, a hypothesis Diabaté considers plausible.

=== Indénié and Djuablin ===
To the northeast, other Aowin–Anyi migrants settled in the Abengourou region, founding the polities of Indénié and its surrounding Djuablin territories. These groups maintained ritual and political ties to their Aowin origin through the continued use of sacred stools, regalia, and oral genealogies. Indénié developed as a kingdom with a strong chieftaincy and military identity, while Djuablin functioned as a broader territorial designation encompassing affiliated villages. Their organization reflected both Aowin statecraft and local adaptation to new demographic and ecological conditions.

== Legacy ==
Today, the legacy of Aowin endures most prominently among the Anyi people (also known as Agni or Ebrosa) of southeastern Ivory Coast and parts of southeastern Ghana, particularly within the kingdoms of Sanwi, Indénié, Djuablin, and Moronou. These polities trace their lineage, state rituals, and sacred regalia back to the royal house of Aowin, and particularly to the ancestral stool of Ano Assinman, the last paramount ruler before the 1715 conquest.

Among these successor states, Krinjabo (Kèlènjɩabu) became the ritual and symbolic capital. Oral traditions from Sanwi affirm that the Belemgbin (King) of Krinjabo retains ceremonial authority over many Agni territories and clans, a continuity that reflects the former centralized role of Aowin leadership.

Culturally, the Anyi retained the matrilineal inheritance systems, royal titles, and political hierarchies that characterized the pre-conquest Aowin state. Sacred items such as the amuan (charms of war), momome (ritual defenses), and the command stool are still venerated and integrated into chieftaincy institutions.

Furthermore, linguistic continuity is evident: dialects spoken by the Agni retain structural similarities to the Twi-derived Aowin language, and ritual observances such as the Elulie yam festival preserve symbolic and calendrical elements of the Aowin ceremonial cycle.

While the political centrality of Aowin diminished after its defeat, its cultural influence expanded westward, shaping the political institutions and spiritual systems of the wider Agni world.

== See also ==
- Anyi people
- Akan people
- Asante Empire
- Denkyira
- Nzima
- Sefwi people

== Sources ==
- Akpenan, Yera Lazare (23 November 2013). "Les Morofoue : des origines diverses de l'Aowin à la création du royaume embryonnaire du Moronou (1721-1780)" [The Morofoue: from the diverse origins of Aowin to the creation of the embryonic kingdom of Moronou (1721-1780)] (PDF). Revue Ivoirienne d'Histoire (in French) (22). Universiaires de Côte d'Ivoire: 102–130.
- Daaku, K. Y. (1973). "A History of Sefwi: A Survey of Oral Evidence". Research Review. NS. 9 (3): 32–36.
- Diabaté, Henriette Dagri (2013). Le Sanvi: Un royaume Akan (1701–1901). Vol. 1. Abidjan / Paris: CERAP / Karthala / IRD. ISBN 9782811109035.
- Fairhead, James; Leach, Melissa (2003). Reframing Deforestation: Global Analyses and Local Realities—Studies in West Africa. London: Routledge. ISBN 978-1-134-66517-4.
- Ogot, B. A. (1999). Africa from the Sixteenth to the Eighteenth Century. UNESCO General History of Africa Vol. V. London: Heinemann. ISBN 978-0-435-94811-5.
- Perrot, Claude-Hélène (1981). "Traditions orales et archéologie : une migration anyi (Côte d'Ivoire)". Publications de la Société française d'histoire des outre-mers (in French). 5-6-1: 307–320.
- Wilks, Ivor (1993). Forests of Gold: Essays on the Akan and the Kingdom of Asante. Ohio University Press. ISBN 9780821411353.
