= Sefwi =

Sefwi or Sehwi may refer to:

- Sefwi people, an ethnic group of Ghana
- Sehwi language, their language
- Kingdom of Sefwi, pre-colonial Akan kingdom
