= Baoulé =

Baoulé or Baule may refer to:

- Baoulé people
- Baoulé language
