= Kingdom of Sefwi =

Former Akan state, ca. 17th–19th century

Kingdom of Sefwi Sefwi
- 17th century–19th century
- Status: Former kingdom
- Capital: Sefwi Wiawso
- Common languages: Sefwi; Central Tano
- Religion: Akan religion
- Government: Monarchy
- Omanhene
- History
  - Migration from Bono, Adansi, and other Akan states: 17th century
  - Alliance with Asante in Awowin war: 1715
  - Incorporation into Asante sphere: 18th century
  - Disestablished: 19th century
- Currency: Gold dust, Cowries
Preceded by	Succeeded by
Aowin	Sefwi-Wiawso Municipal District
- Today part of: Ghana; Ivory Coast

The Kingdom of Sefwi was a historical Akan state located in the western forest zone of what is now Ghana. It emerged in the 17th century as a confederation of migrant groups fleeing political upheaval in Bono, Adansi, Denkyira, and Asante, who settled in lands previously held by the Aowin polity. Over time, Sefwi developed into three autonomous states—Sefwi Wiawso, Sefwi-Anhwiaso, and Sefwi-Bekwai—each governed by its own paramount chief but sharing a common language, religious tradition, and festival system.

== History ==
The name "Sefwi" is thought to derive from the Twi phrase Esa awie ("the war is over"), reflecting the region's role as a place of refuge. Early European records refer to the area as "Inkassa" or "Enkassa." By the 17th century, migrant clans from Wenchi, Adanse, and other Akan states settled in the Sefwi forests. While some retained matrilineal clan structures, others adapted to sociopolitical customs shaped by earlier Aowin and Bono influence. In time, competing claims to autochthony and conquest—especially among rival stools—became embedded in oral traditions and legal disputes.

Wiawso emerged as the most prominent of the Sefwi polities. Early rulers such as Obumankoma and Nkoa I established it as a central authority. The town’s position on elevated terrain offered strategic advantages during regional conflicts. Later narratives recorded in the 20th century sought to retroactively reinforce the authority of Wiawso over contested areas such as Boinzan and Debiso.

=== Alliance with Asante and Expansion ===
Following the collapse of Denkyira, Sefwi Wiawso aligned with the rising Asante Empire, supporting its campaign against Aowin around 1715. Nkoa I, then ruler of Wiawso, participated in the offensive and was granted control over Aowin territories west of the Tano River as recognition. This strategic partnership elevated Wiawso's status and widened its domain. Although incorporated into Asante’s political orbit, the Sefwi retained internal autonomy under their own rulers. In practice, Wiawso’s subordinates continued to assert distinct historical narratives, especially where colonial definitions of stool boundaries and tribute obligations later came into play.

== Society and Political Structure ==
Sefwi society was organized into matrilineal clans and warrior companies. Political administration mirrored broader Akan traditions, with offices such as the Krontihene, Gyaasehene, and Ankobeahene. However, local adaptations emerged from the fusion of Bono-Aowin customs and migrant institutions. In Wiawso, the paramountcy known as the Asankera stool incorporated at least three major clans: Oyoko, Asakyiri, and Bretuo.

Colonial and postcolonial sources classified Wiawso as the senior Sefwi state, though this status was frequently challenged. Stools such as Boinzan and Debiso asserted alternative claims to legitimacy by invoking first-settlement rights or ancestral independence, creating long-standing political friction within the Wiawso oman. These tensions were often expressed through rhetorical genealogies that shaped succession disputes and influenced access to land revenues.

Succession rivalries were especially pronounced in Anhwiaso and Chirano, where conflicting oral traditions reflected unresolved disputes over stool rank, kinship legitimacy, and political autonomy.

=== Economy and Trade ===
The precolonial economy of Sefwi was based on gold mining, ivory hunting, kola cultivation, and forest trade. Settlements such as Bonzan (Boinzan) were noted for their gold deposits and became important centers of regional exchange. These economic assets contributed to later contests over tribute-sharing between Wiawso and its subordinate stools.

Trade routes linked Sefwi to Begho in the north and to coastal forts operated by Europeans. In the late 19th century, rubber tapping gained importance due to the abundance of Funtumia elastica and Landolphia owariensis. Iron implements were either locally forged or imported from nearby industrial centers such as Maudaso and Bopa-Piri.

=== Religion and Cultural Traditions ===
Sefwi communities celebrated a unifying yam festival known as Allelolle, associated with ancestral rites and agrarian renewal. The festival reinforced inter-clan solidarity and affirmed political hierarchy.

A regional deity named Sobore—a fertility spirit tied to a freshwater stream—was widely venerated. Sobore worship likely predates the consolidation of the Sefwi states and may reflect spiritual continuities with earlier Aowin belief systems. Linguistically, Sefwi dialects diverged from central Akan forms, incorporating phonological influences from Awowin and Bono sources.

== Legacy ==
Although the political autonomy of the Sefwi states was curtailed under colonial rule, their traditional institutions remain active. Sefwi Wiawso today serves as the capital of the Western North Region of Ghana and continues to be the seat of a paramount chief. The history of the Sefwi kingdom reflects broader Akan themes of migration, warfare, spiritual continuity, and cultural resilience.

== See also ==
- Akan people
- Sefwi-Wiawso Municipal District
- Asante Empire
- Denkyira
- Nzema
- Aowin
- Roman Catholic Diocese of Wiawso

== Sources ==
- Daaku, K. Y. (1973). "A History of Sefwi: A Survey of Oral Evidence". Research Review. NS. 9 (3): 32–36.
- Boni, Stefano (2000). "Contents and Contexts: The Rhetoric of Oral Traditions in the Ɔman of Sefwi Wiawso, Ghana". Africa: Journal of the International African Institute. 70 (4): 568–594. doi:10.3366/afr.2000.70.4.568. hdl:11380/583523. JSTOR 1161473.
