= Chokosi =

Chokosi may refer to:

- Chakosi people
- Chakosi language
