= Anufo =

Chakosi, or Anufo, may be:

- Chakosi people
- the Chakosi language
