= Amon N'Douffou V =

King of the Sanwi since 2005

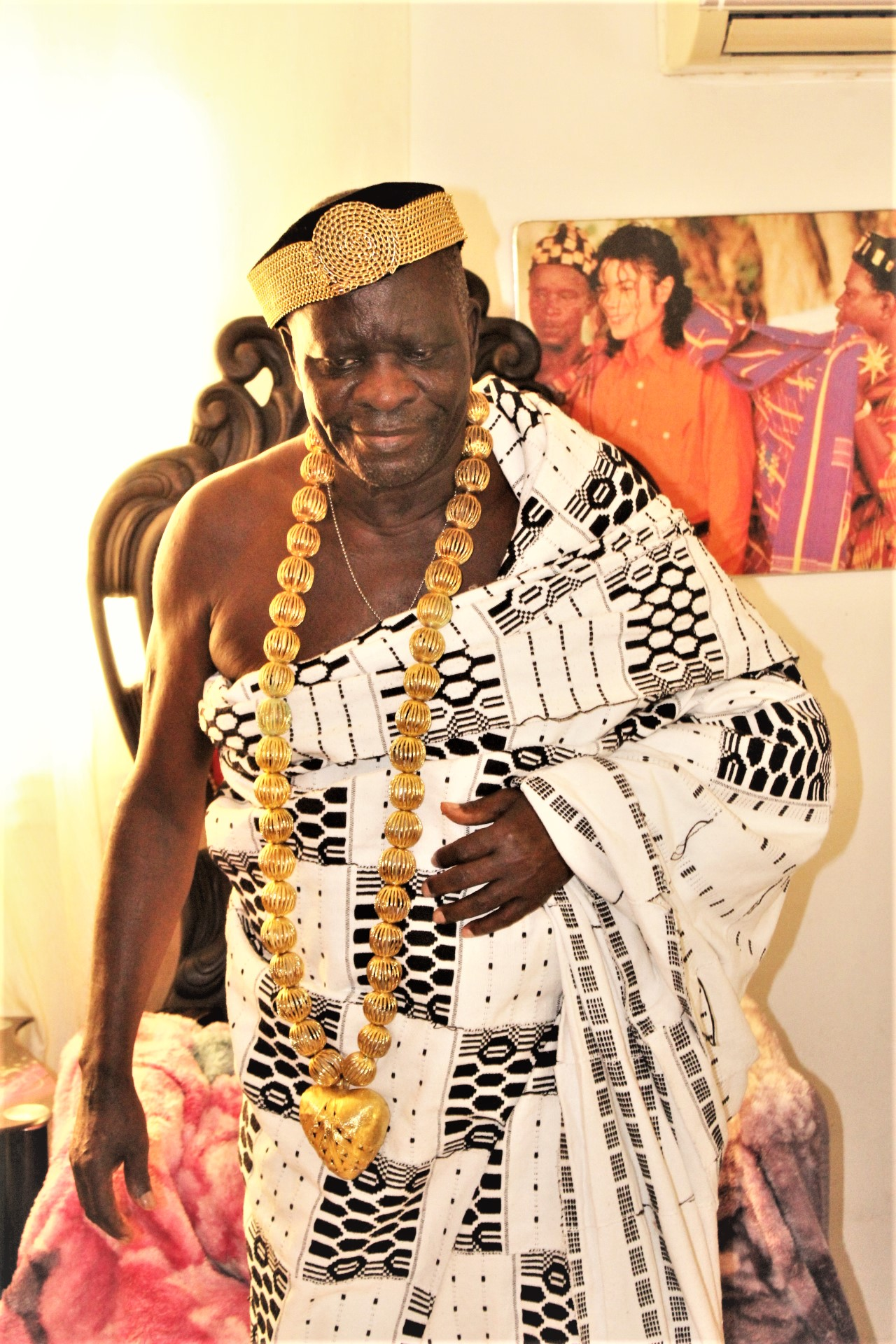
- Amon N'Douffou V in 2022

King of the sanwi
- Absolute monarchy: Since August 5, 2005
- Predecessor: Amon N'Douffou IV
- Born: Enan Eboua Koutoua Francis

Amon N'Douffou V (born Enan Eboua Koutoua Francis) is king of the Kingdom of Sanwi in Ivory Coast, Africa. He was enthroned August 5, 2005, which was reported by AllAfrica.com to result in "popular jubilation". The coronation, held in Krinjabo, took three days.

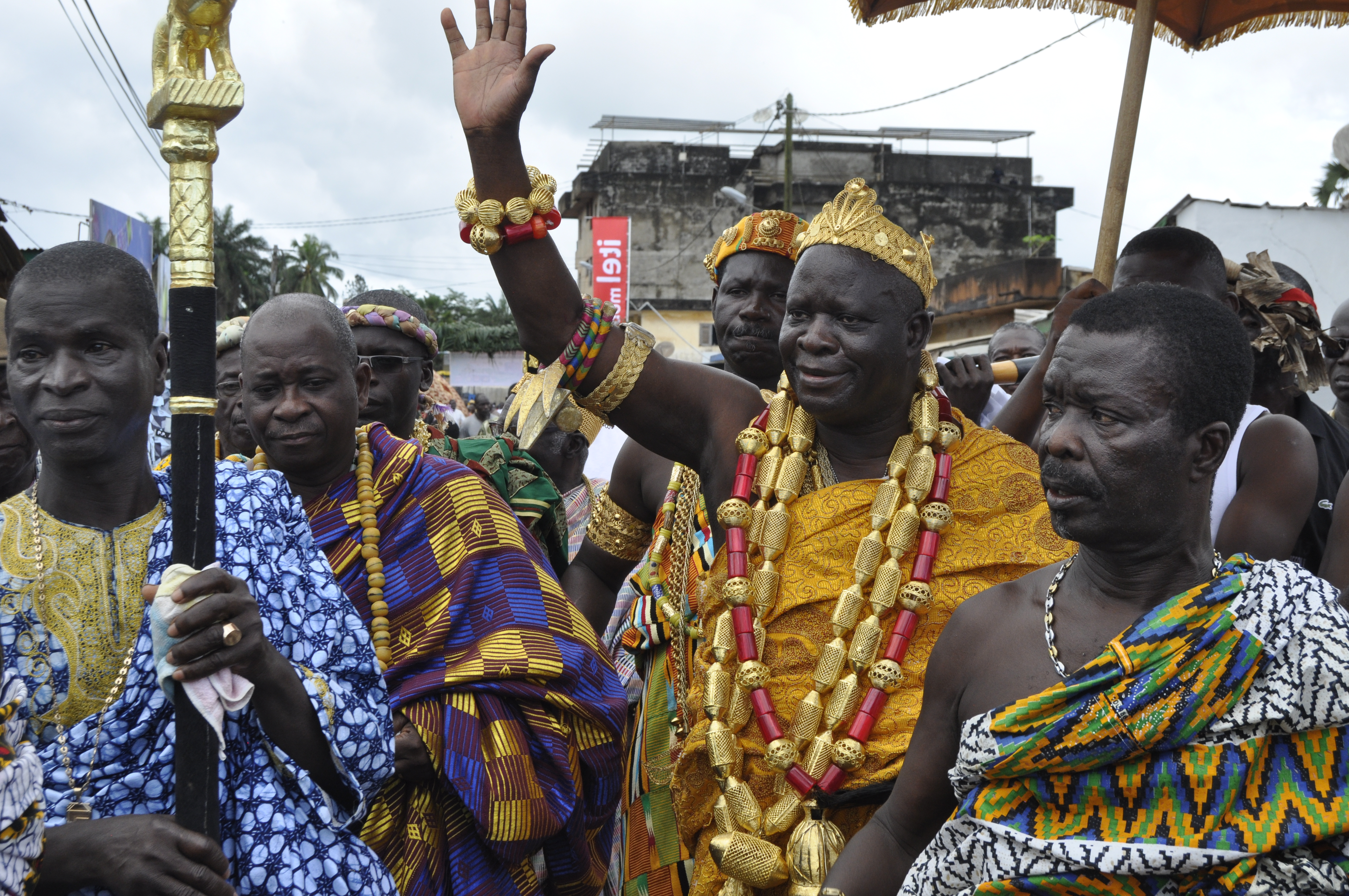
His Majesty Amon N'Douffou V in 2017 (center, dressed in gold)

On March 7, 2010, Amon N'Douffou V made a speech to his people against the appropriation of land within the kingdom, which is often used for natural rubber farming.

On March 28, 2019, Amon N'Douffou V watched over the enthronement ceremony of the Baoulé people's new king, His Majesty Nanan Kassi Anvo.

In April 2019, Amon N'Douffou V stated he would donate funds to help to rebuild the Notre-Dame de Paris after the Notre-Dame de Paris fire. He stated, "The pictures disturbed my sleep and I could not spend the night, because this cathedral represents a strong link between my kingdom and France."
