= Krindjabo =

- Village
- Location in Ivory Coast
- Coordinates: 5°24′N 3°13′W
- Country: Ivory Coast
- District: Comoé
- Region: Sud-Comoé
- Department: Aboisso
- Sub-prefecture: Aboisso
- Founded: c. 1740–1750

Population
  - Ethnicities: Anyi (Agni)
- Time zone: UTC+0 (GMT)

Krindjabo is a village in south-eastern Ivory Coast and the traditional royal capital of the Kingdom of Sanwi, one of the oldest Akan kingdoms in the country's history. It is in the sub-prefecture of Aboisso, Aboisso Department, Sud-Comoé Region, Comoé District. The village is situated approximately 11 kilometres south of Aboisso on the Bia River.

Krindjabo was a commune until March 2012, when it became one of the 1,126 communes nationwide that were abolished.

== Etymology ==
The village takes its name from a large cherry tree known as Krindja in the Anyi language. According to Sanwi oral tradition, Aka Essoin, a lieutenant of the first Sanwi king Amalaman Anoh, discovered the tree on the far bank of the Bia River while scouting for defensible land. The Anyi people subsequently settled beneath it, calling the site Krindjabo ("under the Krindja tree").

== Geography ==
Krindjabo lies in the forested lowlands of south-eastern Ivory Coast, in a landscape of hills and valleys near the Bia River, a 300-kilometre watercourse that rises in Ghana and empties into the Atlantic Ocean through the Aby Lagoon. The broader Sud-Comoé Region receives among the highest annual rainfall in Ivory Coast, exceeding 1,600 mm, a condition that has favoured the cultivation of cocoa, coffee, rubber, bananas, and oil palm. Aboisso, the departmental capital, is approximately 8 km to the north.

== History ==
=== Founding of the Kingdom of Sanwi ===
Krindjabo was founded around 1740–1750 by Anyi (Agni) migrants, an Akan subgroup who had fled conflicts with the expanding Ashanti Empire in present-day Ghana. Led by their first king, Amalaman Anoh, the Anyi initially settled at Diby in the Aboisso area, where they subdued the Agoua, the region's original inhabitants. After an intermediate settlement at Ciman, a hilltop valley chosen for its defensibility, Aka Essoin identified the site across the Bia River—reachable only by swimming—as a more secure location. The Anyi relocated there and established Krindjabo as the capital of the Kingdom of Sanwi, which developed a centralised monarchy governed by matrilineal succession.

Under the reign of Amon N'Douffou II, the first Europeans arrived in the region. The queen mother, Malan Alloua, is said to have refused to let the newcomers settle in Krindjabo, instead directing them to a nearby stony area called Ebouêsso ("on the stone" in Anyi), a name that was later corrupted into Aboisso.

=== Early French contact ===
The earliest direct link between Krindjabo and France dates to 1687, when Louis XIV's agents first made contact with the Sanwi kingdom. A young prince named Aniaba, aged about fifteen, was taken to Paris by the Chevalier d'Amon as a pledge of loyalty. In 1691 he was baptised at Notre-Dame de Paris by Bossuet, with Louis XIV as his godfather, taking the name Louis Aniaba. He joined the king's cavalry regiment, reportedly becoming the first Black officer in the French army. On 12 February 1701 he received the insignia of the Order of the Star of Our Lady at Notre-Dame before returning to Ivory Coast.

=== Colonial era ===
On 4 July 1843, the Kingdom of Sanwi became a protectorate of France through a treaty signed at Krindjabo between Lieutenant Fleuriot de Langle and King Amon N'Douffou. This was among the earliest protectorate treaties in what would become Ivory Coast; similar agreements were signed at Grand-Bassam and Assinie in 1843–1844 by Admiral Louis Édouard Bouët-Willaumez.

Between 1887 and 1889, Marcel Treich-Laplène, an agent of the French trader Arthur Verdier, negotiated further treaties with the Sanwi at Krindjabo as part of a broader campaign to extend French influence inland. These expeditions, together with those of Lieutenant Louis-Gustave Binger, laid the groundwork for the formal establishment of the Colony of Ivory Coast in 1893.

=== Post-independence and the Sanwi affair ===
When Ivory Coast gained independence on 7 August 1960, the Kingdom of Sanwi was incorporated into the new republic. King Amon N'Douffou III resisted integration, citing the 1843 protectorate treaty as evidence of Sanwi's distinct sovereignty. On 12 April 1959, he called for a boycott of legislative elections in the Aboisso constituency; of 14,831 registered voters, only 3,202 participated, an abstention rate exceeding 70 percent. On 3 May 1959, the king proclaimed an autonomous "Principality of Sanwi" before being forced into exile by the government of Félix Houphouët-Boigny.

After a 1966 coup in Ghana removed the government that had sheltered the Sanwi exiles, Houphouët-Boigny arranged their return and passed an amnesty law. The movement revived briefly in 1969, when government troops suppressed a renewed separatist call. In 1981, on the occasion of a visit to Ivory Coast by Pope John Paul II, Houphouët-Boigny ordered the release of the remaining Sanwi political detainees and restored Amon N'Douffou III to his throne.

=== Michael Jackson and international attention ===
On 14 February 1992, American singer Michael Jackson visited Krindjabo during a goodwill tour of Africa. Following a ceremony involving traditional Agni drumming and ritual dances beneath a sacred tree, King Amon N'Douffou IV crowned Jackson a prince of the Sanwi, conferring on him the royal name Amalaman Anoh. Amon N'Douffou IV later made a reciprocal visit to Jackson in Los Angeles. After Jackson's death on 25 June 2009, the kingdom held a two-day funeral in Krindjabo attended by more than a thousand people, and village leaders unsuccessfully petitioned Jackson's family for the return of his remains for a traditional burial. In August 2009, American civil rights leader Jesse Jackson was named a prince of the Sanwi in a ceremony at Krindjabo, succeeding Michael Jackson in the honorary title.

In the decades since Jackson's visit, Krindjabo has attracted members of the African diaspora, particularly African Americans, who travel to the village as a heritage pilgrimage. In May 2019, King Amon N'Douffou V received a delegation of approximately thirty diaspora visitors at the royal court.

=== Notre-Dame donation ===
In April 2019, following the Notre-Dame de Paris fire, King Amon N'Douffou V pledged a donation toward the cathedral's reconstruction, citing the historical link between the kingdom and Notre-Dame through Prince Aniaba's baptism there in 1691. He announced the pledge at a public ceremony at the royal court in Krindjabo.

== Culture ==
=== Royal court ===
The royal court at Krindjabo remains the ceremonial seat of the Kingdom of Sanwi. It functions as a site of communal gathering, celebration, and dispute resolution for the Anyi-Sanwi people of the region. The current king, Amon N'Douffou V, was enthroned in a three-day coronation ceremony at Krindjabo on 5 August 2005. In the Sanwi system, the king is chosen from a specific founding family through matrilineal descent and rules for life, though he may be removed for misgovernance.

=== Fête des ignames ===
The annual fête des ignames (yam festival) is the principal traditional celebration of the Anyi-Sanwi people. Held in late November or early December as decreed by the king, the festival marks the beginning of the new year in the Sanwi calendar. The observance begins on a Thursday evening and continues through Friday with the mgbala (a purification rite at dawn) and the attoumgblan (a sacrifice to lacustrine deities). Although the Anyi-Sanwi are not themselves major yam cultivators, the festival commemorates the role the tuber played in sustaining the Akan people during their ancestral migration from Ghana.
