= Goli (dance) =

Traditional dance from West Africa

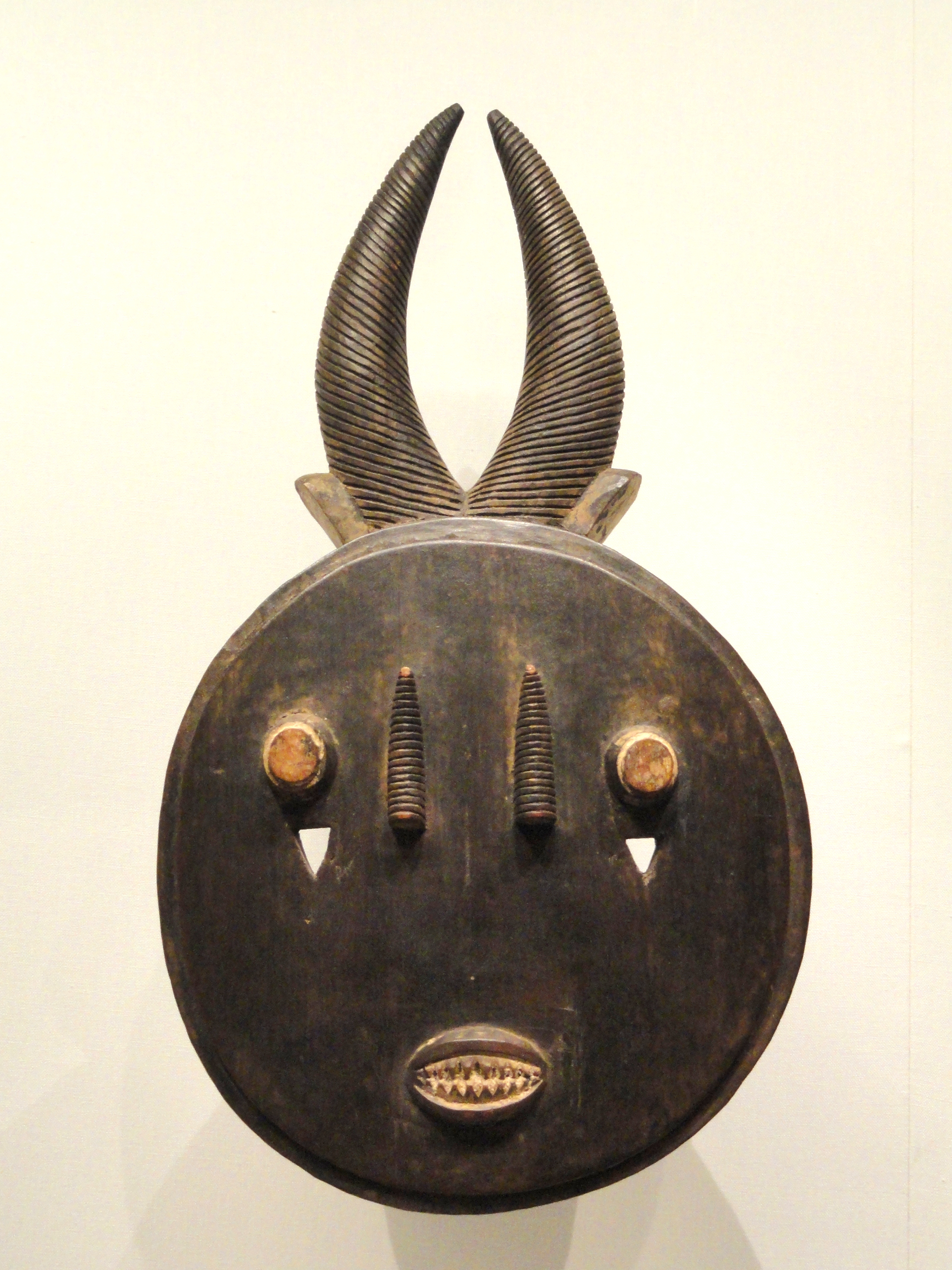
Kple kple

Goli is a traditional African dance and masquerade of the Baoulé people of the Ivory Coast. A single performance of a goli lasts an entire day.

The goli originated among the Wan people, neighbours of the Baoulé. It was adopted by the Baoulé between 1900 and 1910, perhaps in response to the disruption caused by European colonialism. Today it is the dominant traditional dance form, gradually replacing all others. It may be performed on important occasions, such as funerals, or for entertainment.

The two dancers in a goli wear four different types of traditional masks in a prescribed order: first the disc-shaped kple kple, then the antelope-and-crocodile-inspired goli glen, then the ram-horned kpan pre and finally the human-faced kpan with crested hair. The masks have complex symbolism. At each stage, one mask is "male" and another "female", although the differences between them are subtle, since they represent aspects of one individual. For example, the male kple kple is red and the female is black. The kple kple and the goli glen together constitute the "female" half of the dance, while the later masks are "male". Each mask is also conceived of as having male and female aspects.
