= Anufo people =

Ethnic group in Ghana

Anufo
Total population
- c. 100,000

Languages
- Anufo, French, Hausa

Related ethnic groups
- Other Akans, especially Anyi, Baoulé, Sefwi and Aowin

The Anufo, Anufɔ, or Chokossi are an Akan people who live in the Dapaong and Mango areas of northern Togo, as well as in northeastern Ghana and northern Benin. There are approximately 100,000 Anufo people across these countries, as of 2010. They mostly speak the Anufo language, one of the Akan languages.

== Name ==
The Anufo trace their origin to a place called Anou or Ano on the Komoé River in the Ivory Coast, and they migrated east during the 18th century. Thus, they refer to themselves Anoufou "people of Anu", after their ancestral homeland. They are also referred to by the exonym Chokossi, which has many alternate spellings, including Chakasi, Chakossi, Kyokosi, Kyokoshi, Tschokossi, and Tyokossi.

== History ==
The oral history of the Anufo begins in the early 18th century, in the present-day Ivory Coast. Over the course of the reign of the Ashanti king Opoku Ware I, people of various cultures and languages merged together in the region around Anou. Around 1751, a subset of these people formed a mercenary army and headed east, likely invited to fight on behalf of the king of Gonja.

Anufo oral traditions insist that the mercenary band was supposed to return to Anou, but conflicting reasons are given for why they instead chose to stay in the area around Gambaga, in present-day northeastern Ghana. One story says that they had been hired as mercenaries by the Mamprusi and stayed there while waiting to get paid for their work. Another story says that they started to return to Anou but stopped when their leader died in Gambaga. Regardless of the reason, the Anufo settled down with their main city in the Mango region of Togo, which became a trade hub.

Social structures within the Anufo still reflect aspects of this mercenary history. The group of soldiers consisted of Mande horsemen, Akan musket-toting foot soldiers, and some Muslim scholar amulet-makers. Although they now have a shared history and tradition, some distinctions remain between the three original classes. The noble and (Muslim) clerical classes traditionally shared a social system that is distinct from the "commoners". Anufo society retains a clan structure based on different roles in battles.

== Culture ==
=== Property ===
Traditionally, the Anufo people considered most of a village's property communally-owned rather than individually-held, with notions of "ownership" depending more on who was using it or needed it than any other factor. Although animals were raised by and owned by specific people, in cases of need, they were shared by the community. Village land was owned jointly by all members of a kin-group, even if some members lived elsewhere. By the 1980s, shifting social patterns led to increased privatization of these communal resources.

=== Naming conventions ===
Like other Akan peoples, Anufo children are given first names based on the day of the week that they are born. However, in the Anufo language, the names of the days of the week are ordered differently from the standard Akan day names.
