= Kingdom of Sanwi =

African kingdom

- Flag of Sanwi

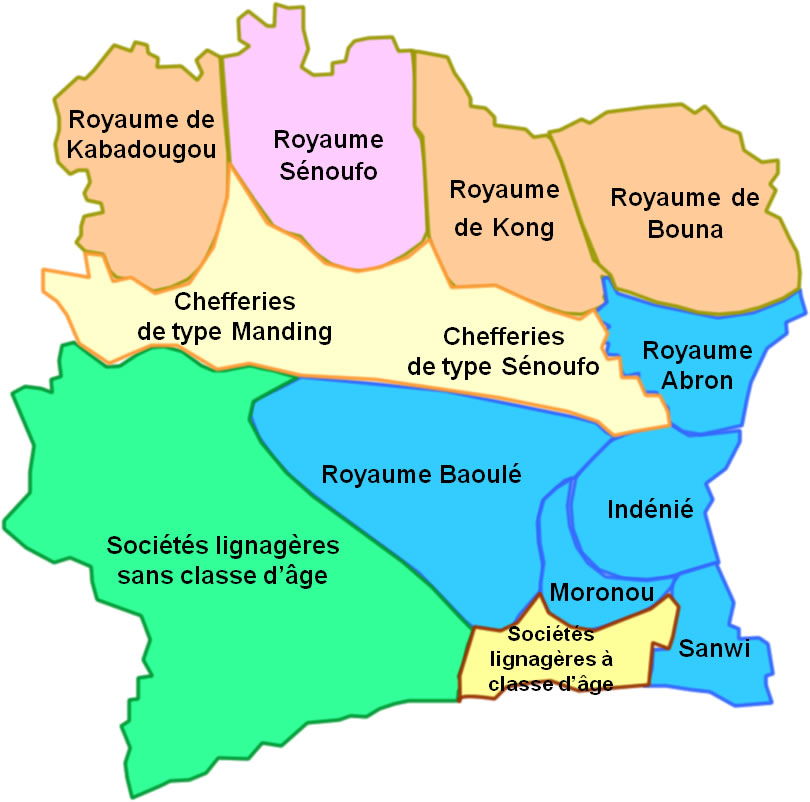
- Pre-European kingdoms

Total population
- 20,000 (est.)

Regions with significant populations
- Krindjabo, Africa

Languages
- Anyi language

Religion
- Akan religion and Christianity

The Kingdom of Sanwi is a traditional kingdom located in the south-east corner of the Republic of Ivory Coast in West Africa.

It was established in about 1740 by Anyi migrants from Ghana with its capital at Krindjabo. In 1843, the kingdom became a protectorate of France. In 1959, it merged with Ivory Coast.

In the early 19th century, Sanwi was a vassal to the Asante Empire until this status was destroyed as a result of French colonial expansion in the region.

The kingdom declared American singer Michael Jackson to be High Prince of the Sanwi in 1992. Reciprocal visits by Jackson and King Amon N'Douffou IV were made to Krindjabo and Los Angeles respectively. After Jackson's death in 2009, an elaborate two-day funeral was held in Sanwi. Jesse Jackson (no relation) was declared prince in August of that year when he was crowned Prince Nana by Amon N'Douffou V, and held the office until his death in 2026.

== List of monarchs ==
- Kouane Adinga II (1940-1942)
- Amon N'Douffou III (1944-1979)
- Kakou Andoh (1980-1985)
- Amon N'Douffou IV (1985-2002)
- vacant (2002-2005)
- Amon N'Douffou V (2005–present)
