= Queen Pokou =

Ashanti Queen and founder of the Baoule tribe

Queen Pokou, or Awura, Aura, or Abla Pokou (reigned c. 1750 - c. 1760) was queen and founder of the Baoule ethnic group in West Africa, now Ivory Coast. She ruled over a branch of the powerful Ashanti Empire as it expanded westward. A subgroup of the Akan people, the Baoule people are today one of the largest ethnic groups in modern Ivory Coast.

== Biography ==
Queen Pokou was born princess of Kumasi, Ghana, daughter of Nyakou Kosiamoa, sister of Dakon, the ill-fated successor of Opoku Ware I, and niece of Osei Kofi Tutu I, a formidable king who was the co-founder of the Ashanti Empire.

Queen Pokou became the leader of a breakaway group from the main Ashanti Empire, which she refused to join. Disagreements among the factions resulted in war. Pokou led her group westward, through a long, arduous journey, to the Komoé River. Legend has it that she had to sacrifice her only son for her people to cross the river.

After crossing the river, Pokou and her people settled into an agricultural way of life in the savanna of the area. Pokou died shortly after creating the Baoule kingdom. Her niece Akwa Boni succeeded to the throne. She pursued wars of conquest to widen the limits of the young kingdom. The Baoule people today inhabit the territory between the Komoé and Bandama Rivers. They make up 15 percent of the country's population, having assimilated some smaller tribes over the centuries.

== Legend ==
The founding legend of the Baoule people holds that, when Pokou and her people arrived at the Komoé River, it was uncrossable. Pokou asked her priest for council, and he told her the sacrifice of a noble child was required to cross the river. Pokou then sacrificed her son, throwing the infant into the water. Legend has it that, after the sacrifice, hippopotami appeared and formed a bridge, which Pokou and her people used to cross to the opposite bank of the Komoé. Once on the other side, she called out "Ba ouli" or "the child is dead." This is why her descendants today are known as the Baoule.

== Portrayal in Film ==
The Ivorian animated film Pokou, princesse Ashanti by N'ganza Herman and Kan Souffle, which was released in Ivory Coast in 2013, was inspired by the legendary life of Abla Pokou.

== Portrayal in Literature ==
In Queen Pokou: Concerto for a Sacrifice, which won the Grand prix littéraire d'Afrique noire, Véronique Tadjo offers multiple versions of the legend of Queen Pokou. The story of Queen Pokou and the Baoule was also retold by Maximilien Quenum in his Légendes africaines.
