= Baoulé language =

Language in Ivory Coast

Baoulé
- Wawle
- Region: Ivory Coast
- Ethnicity: Baoulé people
- Native speakers: 5.3 million (2021)
- Language family: Niger–Congo?: Atlantic–Congo; Volta-Congo; Kwa; Potou–Tano; Tano; Akan; Bia; North Bia; Baoulé
- Writing system: Latin

Language codes
- ISO 639-3: bci
- Glottolog: baou1238

Baoulé (native name: Wawle), also known as Baule or Bawule, is an Akan language spoken in central and southern Ivory Coast, including in the regions of Lacs, Lagunes, Gôh-Djiboua, Sassandra-Marahoué, Vallée du Bandama, Woroba, and Yamoussoukro, by approximately 5.3 million people. It is a Kwa language of the Akan branch, forming a dialect continuum with Anyin and closely related to Nzema and Sehwi. It is the common language of the Baoulé people, the largest ethnic group in Ivory Coast.

== Written works ==
In 1946, portions of the Bible translated into Baoulé were first published; the full New Testament followed in 1953. The complete Bible was published first in 1998, by the Bible Society in Abidjan.

In late 2024, Aristide Kouamé, an Ivorian Wikimedian who got the idea while attending Wikimania 2023, assembled a team to create a Baoulé Wikipedia in Wikimedia Incubator. The first Baoulé-language articles appeared in early 2025, and the incubated wiki has since grown to six people. It would be the first wiki in any of the indigenous languages of Ivory Coast.

== Phonology ==
=== Consonants ===
		Labial	Alveolar	Palatal	Velar	Labial- velar
Plosive	voiceless	p	t	c	k	kp
Plosive	voiced	b	d	ɟ	g	gb
Fricative	voiceless	f	s			
Fricative	voiced	v	z			
Nasal		m	n	ɲ		
Lateral			l			
Trill			r			
Approximant				j		w

=== Vowels ===
	Front	Central	Back
Close	i		u
Close-mid	e		o
Open-mid	ɛ		ɔ
Open		a	

Of these vowels, five may be nasalized: /ĩ/, /ɛ̃/, /ã/, /ũ/, and /ɔ̃/.

=== Tones ===
Baoulé has five tones: high, low, mid, rising, and falling.

== Orthography ==
Baoulé uses the following letters to indicate the following phonemes:

Uppercase	A	B	C	D	E	Ɛ	F	G	GB	I	J	L	K	KP	M	N	NY	O	Ɔ	P	S	T	U	V	W	Y	Z
Lowercase	a	b	c	d	e	ɛ	f	g	gb	i	j	l	k	kp	m	n	ny	o	ɔ	p	s	t	u	v	w	y	z
Phoneme	/a/	/b/	/c/	/d/	/e/	/ɛ/	/f/	/g/	/gb/	/i/	/ɟ/	/l/	/k/	/kp/	/m/	/n/	/ɲ/	/o/	/ɔ/	/p/	/s/	/t/	/u/	/v/	/w/	/j/	/z/

== See also ==
- Twi-Fante language
- Anyin language
