= Anyi people =

Ethnic group in Ivory Coast, Ghana and Togo

Anyi
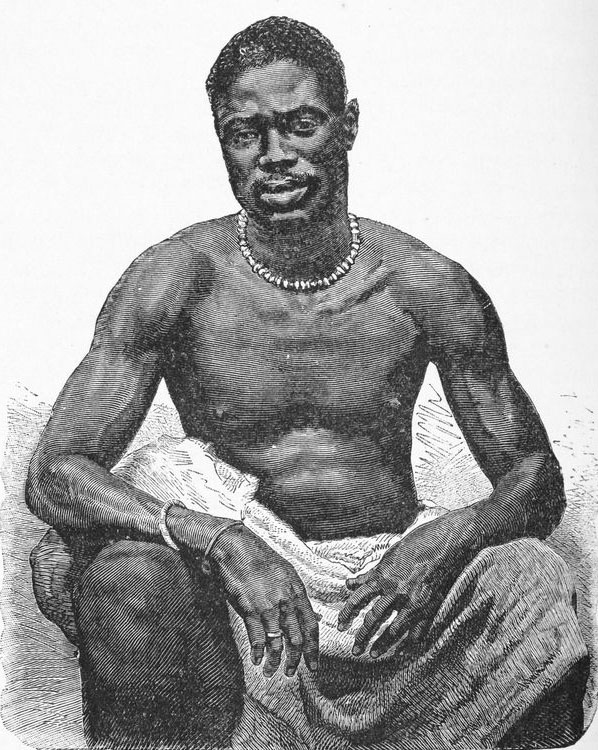
- Drawing of an Agni man, 1892.

Total population
- ~2.5 million

Regions with significant populations

Languages
- Anyi, French

Religion
- Akan religion, Christianity

Related ethnic groups
- Other Akans, especially Baoulé, Chakosi, and Sefwi

The Anyi people (also spelled Agni and historically known as the Aowin) are a branch of the Akan people inhabiting southeastern Côte d'Ivoire and southwestern Ghana. They trace their origins to the ancient Akan state of Bonoman, and historically established a number of influential polities across the forest zones of West Africa. The most prominent of these was the Aowin state, which served as a major center of gold production and trade. Other notable Anyi polities include Indénié, Sanwi, and Bettié, each maintaining cultural and political continuity with Aowin traditions.

== Ethnonymy ==
Various sources refer to the group as Aowin, Awowin, Agnis, Ani, Anya, Anyi, Anyis, or Ndenie.

== History ==
=== Origins ===
The Agni (or Anyi) people trace their origins to the north, as part of the broader Akan migration from the ancient state of Bonoman. According to oral tradition and historical accounts, Aowin (Agni) groups migrated from present-day Ghana during the 17th and early 18th centuries, likely due to the expansionist pressures of larger Akan states such as Denkyira and the Asante Empire. As they crossed into what is now southeastern Ivory Coast, the Agni established several polities, including Indénié (Abengourou), the Kingdom of Sanwi near Krindjabo, the Moronou Kingdom (founded by the Mrôfô Agni), the Kingdom of Bettié, and the Kingdom of Diabé. Subgroups such as the Agni-Assonvon also emerged and settled in areas near Ebilassokro and eastern Côte d'Ivoire, forming culturally distinct but linguistically and historically related communities.

=== Decline and Integration ===
By the 19th century, many Agni states were affected by regional upheaval including the decline of the Asante Empire, the rise of Samori Ture, and the advance of European colonial powers. The once-powerful kingdoms were eventually integrated into French West Africa following France's consolidation of authority in the region. Despite this, the Agni retained a strong sense of royal and clan-based identity, with the Kingdom of Sanwi in particular maintaining symbolic royal institutions well into the modern period.

== Society and Culture ==
Since the 1990s, urban centers in southern Côte d'Ivoire have experienced growing sociopolitical stratification, particularly between forest-dwelling populations and migrants from savannah regions. Forest groups, including the Anyi, tend to reside in older urban cores, while savannah-origin communities more frequently occupy rapidly expanding peri-urban zones.

=== Social Structure and Kinship ===
The Anyi maintain a monarchical political system consistent with broader Akan traditions. Historically stratified into nobility, freemen, and slaves, their society is governed by chiefs and local headmen supported by councils of elders. These authorities preside over social and judicial matters and are embedded within a hierarchical chieftaincy framework that includes titled officials responsible for political, ceremonial, and military roles. Matrilineality is central to Anyi kinship, with lineage, inheritance, and succession traced through the female line. Women exercise considerable authority in economic life and may influence political decision-making at both local and regional levels. Marriage practices involve the exchange of customary items such as O-Bla-Kale (financial provision for the bride's upbringing and education), Adyia-Tila (trousseau or dowry preparation), and Be-Ti-Sika (a symbolic bond between the bride and her natal family). Transgressions such as adultery were traditionally subject to strict sanctions, including social exclusion or, in severe cases, capital punishment. Female pre-marital disclosures were viewed as necessary to affirm lineage legitimacy and uphold communal honor.

=== Religion and Ritual Practice ===
Traditional Akan religion continues to underpin spiritual life among the Anyi, with a focus on ancestor veneration, cosmological order, and ritual propriety. Funeral ceremonies are central cultural events, involving ritual cleansing, the adornment of the deceased, public mourning, and symbolic transition into the spiritual realm.The spiritual authority within Anyi society is embodied in the figure of the Kômian, a ritual specialist trained in esoteric knowledge. Kômians are organized into secret societies and fulfill advisory, divinatory, and ceremonial functions. Through trance states, they mediate between the living and spiritual forces to obtain guidance inaccessible to ordinary individuals.

=== Language and Material Culture ===
The Anyi language belongs to the Central Tano branch of the Niger-Congo languages and is mutually intelligible with other Akan dialects. It is primarily spoken in the Sud-Comoé region, with an estimated speaker population exceeding 250,000. Residential settlements are typically composed of dispersed extended family compounds. Funerary art constitutes a prominent element of Anyi material culture, with elaborate monuments serving as public displays of familial wealth, status, and reverence for the dead.

== Modern Distribution ==
Contemporary Agni (Anyi or Aowin) populations are predominantly situated in southeastern Côte d'Ivoire, with a significant demographic concentration—approximately 11%—in Abengourou, the historical seat of the former Kingdom of Indénié. Additional settlement clusters are located in the Zanzan District, the N'zi-Comoé Region, and territories historically linked to the Kingdom of Sanwi. These communities reflect the continuity of Akan-speaking identities rooted in precolonial migration and state formation.

Across the border in southeastern Ghana, a culturally and historically related Agni-speaking population exists in the Aowin Municipal District of the Western North Region. As of 2021, Aowin Municipality recorded a population of 157,159. This district preserves the name of the historic Aowin polity and continues to reflect its cultural legacy within the Ghanaian state.

=== Economy ===
The Anyi maintain a predominantly agrarian economy, with subsistence and commercial agriculture forming the foundation of livelihood strategies. Key staple crops include banana, taro, and yam, with significant reliance on crops introduced from the Americas during the transatlantic exchange, such as maize, cassava, peppers, peanuts, tomatoes, squash, and sweet potatoes. Livestock husbandry includes sheep, goats, poultry, and dogs.

Periodic markets, held every four days, serve as focal points of the local economy and are primarily operated by women. These markets facilitate the exchange of agricultural produce, artisanal goods, and imported commodities. In addition to agriculture, the Anyi engage in forestry and palm oil production, the latter of which contributes to both domestic consumption and international trade.

In Ghana, particularly within the Aowin Municipal District, the economy remains predominantly agrarian, centered on cocoa cultivation, oil palm processing, timber extraction, and localized commerce. The district also hosts periodic festivals that commemorate ancestral ties to the historic Aowin state, preserving cultural practices deeply embedded in the broader Akan heritage.

== Sources ==
- Boahen, A. Adu (1999). "The states and cultures of the Lower Guinea coast". In Ogot, B.A. (ed.). General History of Africa. Vol. V: Africa from the Sixteenth to the Eighteenth Century (Abridged ed.). James Curry. pp. 204–220. ISBN 0-85255-095-2.
- Daaku, K. Y. (1973). "A History of Sefwi: A Survey of Oral Evidence". Research Review. NS. 9 (3): 32–36.
- Fairhead, James; Leach, Melissa (2003). Reframing Deforestation: Global Analyses and Local Realities—Studies in West Africa. London: Routledge.
- Ogot, B. A. (1999). Africa from the Sixteenth to the Eighteenth Century. UNESCO General History of Africa Vol. V. London: Heinemann.
