= Nzema =

== Nzema ==
Nzema may refer to:

- Nzema people, an ethnic group who predominantly live in southwestern Ghana

- Nzema language, the language of these people

== Nzima ==
Nzima may refer to:

- Sam Nzima (1934–2018), South African photographer
- Sibusiso Nzima (born 1986), South African long distance runner
