= Anufo language =

Tano language spoken in West Africa

Anufo
- Chakosi
- Anufɔ
- Region: Ghana, Togo, Benin, Ivory Coast
- Ethnicity: Anufo people
- Native speakers: 180,000 (2013)
- Language family: Niger–Congo?: Atlantic–Congo; Kwa; Potou–Tano; Tano; Akan; Bia; North; Anufo

Official status
- Recognised minority language in: Benin

Language codes
- ISO 639-3: cko
- Glottolog: anuf1239

Anufo (Anufɔ), also known as Chakosi, is an Akan language spoken in northeast Ghana, northern Togo, northwest Benin and Ivory Coast by approximately 180,000 people. Anufɔ is tonal and follows a subject-verb-object canonical structure. Anufɔ is spoken with dialectical differences across nine tribes, though all are mutually intelligible.

== Population and geography ==
In 2003, the estimated number of speakers of Anufo was a little over 100,000 people, spread across the northern portions of Ghana (53,000), Togo (42,000), and Benin (10,000). Many speakers are multilingual, also speaking Hausa or French. It is used as a trade language in some regions as well.

According to the 2021 Population and Housing Census in Ghana, the Anufɔ in northeast Ghana, especially those in the Chereponi District numbered 87,176. The District covers a land size of 1,374.7 km2 with a population density of 63 persons per square kilometre. The District shares boundaries with Gushegu District to the West, Bunkpurugu-Nakpanduri District to the North, Saboba Districts to the South and The Republic of Togo to the East bordered by the River Oti.

== Phonology ==
Anufo has allophonic palatalization before front vowels.

Consonant allophones
		Labial			Alveolar		Palatal		Velar		Labial-velar		Glottal
		plain	round	palatal	plain	palatal	plain	palatal	plain	round	plain	palatal	Glottal
Nasal		m		mʲ	n		ɲ		ŋ		ŋm	ŋmʲ	
Stop	voiceless	p	pʷ	pʲ	t	tʲ	c	cʲ	k	kʷ	kp	kpʲ	
Stop	voiced	b	bʷ	bʲ	d	dʲ	ɟ	ɟʲ	ɡ	ɡʷ	gb	gbʲ	
Fricative	voiceless	f	fʷ	fʲ	s	ʃ		ɕᶣ					h
Fricative	voiced				z			ʑᶣ					
Rhotic					r	rʲ							
Approximant	voiceless			ɥ̥									
Approximant	voiced			ɥ	l	lᶣ	j				w		

Vowels
	Oral		Nasal	
	Front	Back	Front	Back
Close	i	u	ĩ	ũ
Close-mid	e	o		
Open-Mid	ɛ	ɔ	ɛ̃	ɔ̃
Open	a		ã	

== Syntax ==
Anufo follows the canonical subject-verb-object (SVO) structure in its sentential construction like other cross-linguistic realisations.For instance, in the structure: Kojo akun baka ni (Lit. Kojo has killed the tree), the subject, Kojo (Noun) precedes the verb phrase (has killed), and the direct object (tree). In naturally occurring speech, such sentential constructions in Anufᴐ may undergo pronoun replacement such as in the construction: Kojo akun i (Kojo has killed it). Where the Anufɔ generic pronoun "i", also undefined by number, animacy and gender, is used in place of (the tree).

== Writing ==
Anufɔ is written in the Latin alphabet, with the addition of the letters Ɛ ɛ, Ɱ ɱ, Ŋ ŋ and Ɔ ɔ.
