= Central Tano languages =

Niger–Congo language subgroup of West Africa

Akan
- Central Tano
- Geographic distribution: Ghana, Ivory Coast
- Ethnicity: Akan
- Linguistic classification: Niger–Congo?: Atlantic–Congo; Volta–Congo; Kwa; Potou–Tano; Tano; Akan
- Subdivisions: Bia; Twi-Fante

Language codes
- Glottolog: cent2262

The Akan or Central Tano languages are a pair of dialect clusters of the Atlantic–Congo family (perhaps in a theorised Kwa branch) spoken in Ghana and Ivory Coast by the Akan people.

Akan is commonly called "Central Tano" to disambiguate it from the Twi-Fante language, which has commonly been called "Akan" since a unified Twi-Fante orthography was introduced.

== Internal classification ==
There are two or three languages, each with dialects that are sometimes treated as languages themselves:

- Twi-Fante (primarily in Ghana and East-central Ivory coast (Bono))
  - core (Asante Twi, Akuapem Twi and Fante)
  - Bono–Wasa
- Bia (primarily in Ivory Coast and Western Ghana)
  - Northern Bia language
    - Anyin dialect
    - Baoulé dialect
    - Chakosi (Anufo) dialect
    - Sefwi (Sehwi) dialect
  - Southern Bia language
    - Nzema dialect
    - Ahanta dialect
    - Jwira–Pepesa dialect

All have written forms in the Latin script.
