= Anyin language =

Kwa language spoken in West Africa

Anyin
- Anyi
- Native to: Ivory Coast, Ghana
- Ethnicity: Anyi
- Native speakers: 1.5 million (2017)
- Language family: Niger–Congo?: Atlantic–Congo; Kwa; Potou–Tano; Tano; Akan; Bia; North; Anyin

Language codes
- ISO 639-3: Either: any – Anyin mtb – Anyin Morofo
- Glottolog: anyi1246

Anyin, also known as Agni, Agny, and Anyi, is a Niger-Congo language spoken mainly in Ivory Coast and Ghana. It is a Kwa language of the Akan branch, forming a dialect continuum with Baoulé, and is closely related to Nzema and Sehwi. Its dialects, divided into Northern and Central dialect areas, include Sannvin, Abé, Ano, Bona, Bini, and Barabo in the Northern area and Ndenye and Juablin in the Central area. In Côte d'Ivoire, there are approximately 1.45 million native speakers of Anyin, along with 10,000 second-language users; in Ghana, there are approximately 66,400 speakers.

Morofo, spoken by 300,000 in southeastern Côte d'Ivoire, is sometimes classified as a dialect of Anyin, but may also be classified as a separate language.

== Phonology ==
=== Consonants ===
		Labial	Labial-velar	Alveolar	Palatal	Velar	Glottal
Nasal		m		n	ɲ	ŋ	
Plosive/ Affricate	voiceless	p	kp	t	c	k	
Plosive/ Affricate	voiced	b	gb	d	ɟ	g	
Fricative	voiceless	f		s			h
Approximant		ɥ	w	(l)	j		
Trill				r			

=== Vowels ===
	Front		Back	
Close	i	ɪ	ʊ	u
Mid	e	ɛ	ɔ	o
Open	a			

Of these vowels, five may be nasalized: /ĩ/, /ɪ̃/, /ã/, /ũ/, and /ʊ̃/.

=== Tones ===
Anyin has two level tones, high and mid; two contour tones, high-low and low-high; and one neutral tone. Tones are distinguished orthographically only to distinguish minimal pairs and grammatical constructions, or when two otherwise identical vowels with differing tones co-occur: cf. ⟨baá⟩ ([bàá], "child") vs. ⟨ba⟩ ([bá], "to arrive", "to come").

== Grammar ==
=== Pronouns ===
Anyin uses the following pronouns:

Person		Singular	Plural
1st	subject	mĩ	jɛ
1st	non-subject	mĩ́	jɛ
2nd	subject	ɛ	émɔ́
2nd	non-subject	wɔ́	émɔ́
3rd	subject	ɔ	bɛ́
3rd	non-subject	jí	bɛ́

== See also ==
- Baoulé language
- Nzema language
- Sehwi language
