= Sehwi language =

Ghanaian language

Sefwi
- Esahie
- Region: Ghana
- Ethnicity: Sefwi people
- Native speakers: 310,000 (2013)
- Language family: Niger–Congo?: Atlantic–Congo; Kwa; Potou–Tano; Tano; Akan; Bia; North; Sefwi
- Dialects: Wiawso; Anhwiaso; Aowin

Language codes
- ISO 639-3: sfw
- Glottolog: sehw1238

Sefwi, also known as Sefwi, Esahie, and Asahyue, is a Niger-Congo language spoken by 305,000 across southwestern Ghana, principally in the Western Region. It is the common language of the Sehwi people.

Sehwi is a Kwa language of the Akan branch, closely related to Anyin, and mutually intelligible with the Sannvin dialect of Anyin; its two main dialects are Wiawso, spoken in the southern area of the Sehwi territory, and Anhwiaso, spoken in the northern area. According to Dolphyne, the Aowin dialect, putatively of Anyin, is actually closer to Sehwi.

Virtually all speakers of Sehwi are bilingual in Twi, which is used as the trade language in the region. However, the Sehwi people are fond of their language, such that other tribes who come to stay with Sehwi people tend to speak Sehwi.
