= Baoulé people =

Ethnic group in Côte d'Ivoire

Baoulé
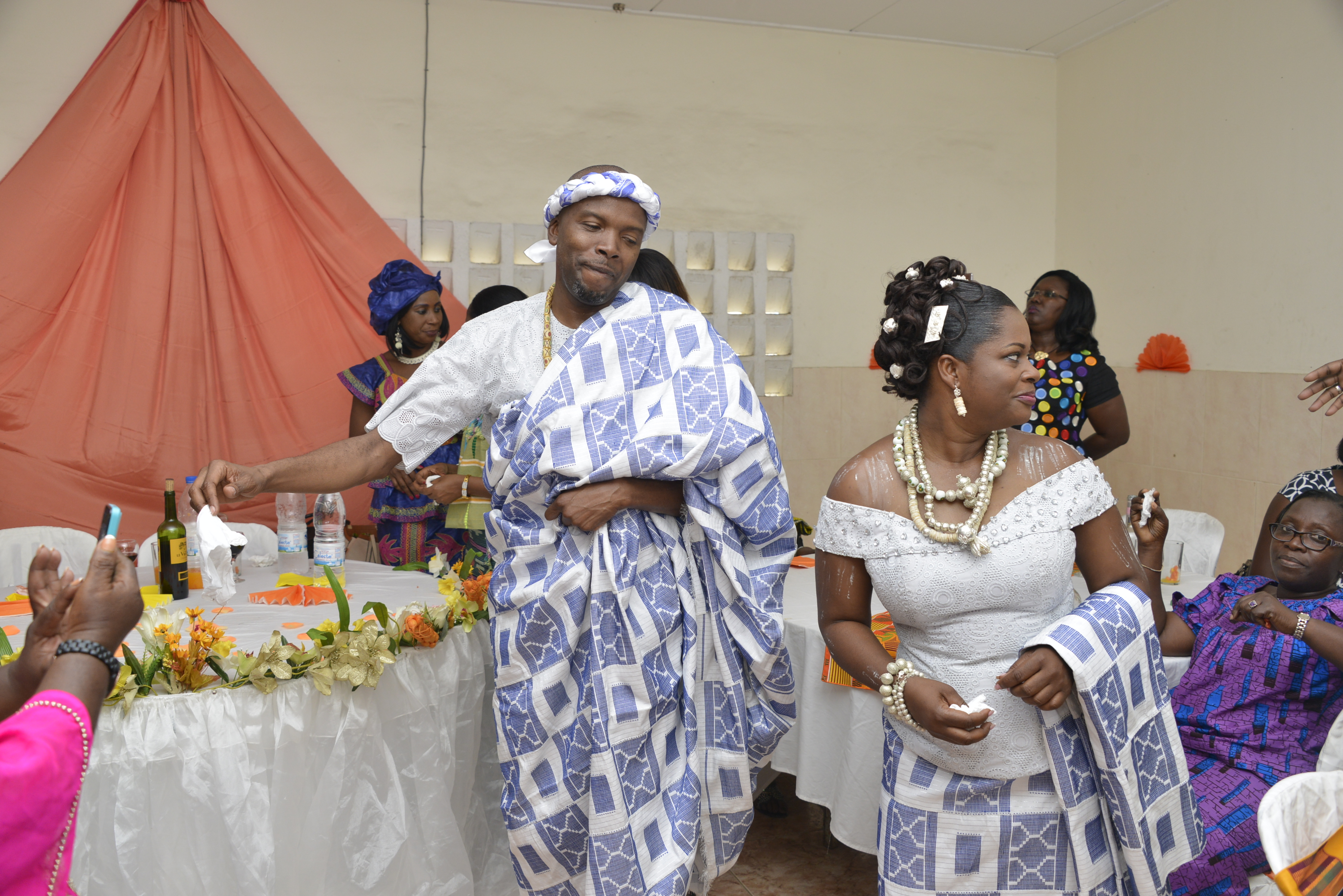

Total population
- 5 million

Regions with significant populations
- Ivory Coast

Languages
- Baoulé, French

Religion
- Christianity, traditional religions, Islam

Related ethnic groups
- Other Akans, especially Anyi, Chakosi, and Sefwi

The Baule or Baoulé /ˈbaʊˌleɪ/ (Baule: Baule [ba.u.le]; French: baoulé [bawle]) are an Akan people and one of the largest ethnicities in Ivory Coast. The Baoulé are traditionally farmers who live in the centre of Ivory Coast, in a French braid shaped region (the Baoule “V”) between the rivers Bandama and N'Zi. This area broadly encompasses the regions around the cities of Bouaké and Yamoussoukro. The Baoulé have come to play a relatively important role in the recent history of Ivory Coast: the state's first president, Félix Houphouët-Boigny, was a Baoulé; additionally, since the Ivorian cocoa boom of the 1960-1970s, the Baoulé have also become one of the most widespread ethnicities throughout the country, especially in the Southern forests (the "Low Coast") where they are amongst the most numerous planters of cocoa, rubber, and coffee and sometimes seem to outnumber the local native ethnic groups.

== Kingdom ==
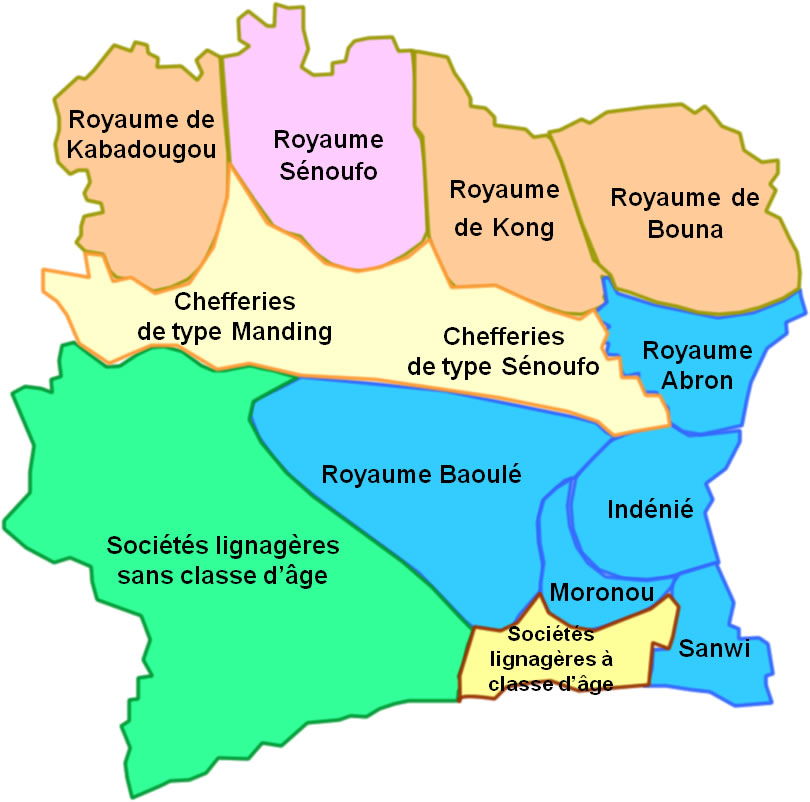
Kingdom of Baoulé amongst other precolonial kingdoms.

The Baoulé Kingdom was established c. 1730 by Queen Abla Pokou. It lasted as a sovereign kingdom until 1893, with the incorporation of the Ivory Coast as a colony of France, making up a part of French West Africa. Its capital being the town of Sakassou in the center of what is now Ivory Coast, it remains a subnational monarchy in the present day.

Rulers of Baoulé
Monarch	Reign
Abla Pokou	c.1730-c.1760
Akoua Bony	c.1760-c.1790
Kouakou Djiê I	c.1790-c.1820
Nanan Kouamé Toto	c.1820-c.1840
Kouakou Anougblé I	c.1840-c.1870
Nanan Toto Diby	c.1870-c.1880
Anougblé Diêkê	c.1880-c.1890
Kouamé Tchêkê I	c.1890-1902
Kouadio N'Dri	1902-1925
Nanan Kouakou Anoungblé II	1925-1958
Nanan Kouakou Djiê II	1959-1978
Nanan Kouakou Anougblé III	1995-2016
Nanan N'Ga Tanou Monique	2016–present

== Leisure ==
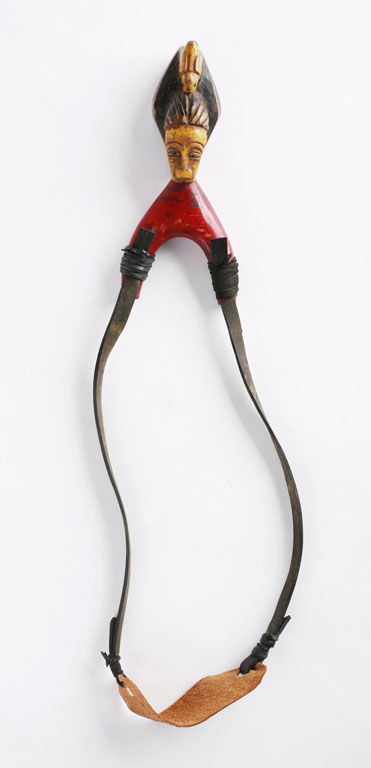
This Baoulé slingshot dates from the late 1980s/early 1990s. From the collection of The Children's Museum of Indianapolis.

One of the favourite pastimes is the game “Atté,” which is similar to the North American version of marbles: Ivorians utilize nuts, not marbles. An odd number of nuts are placed in a circular pattern in the centre of two opposing teams. The two teams, roughly 30 metres apart, take turns throwing nuts at the circle of nuts. Once a nut has been hit, it is eliminated, and the team that hit the respective nut gains a point. The game ends when all the nuts have been eliminated, and the team with the most nuts at the end of the game wins.

== Religion ==
The Baoule religious world consists of three realities :

- Domain of God (Niamien)
- The earthly world: area of human beings, animals and plants, as well as supernatural beings with vast powers who reside in the mountains, rocks, rivers, forests, etc.
- The beyond (blolo) where the spirits of the ancestors reside

== Ivorian children ==
Ivorian children begin aiding their parents with the everyday chores of life at very young ages. As soon as they are old enough, they either carry water from the village pumps or heavy loads of food and firewood to the village market. The boys, when old enough, may even help their father with clearing vegetation.

Like several other groups with Akan origin, Baoulé children are often named according to the day of the week or the circumstances under which they were born. For example, a male born on a Monday would be named Kouassi. However, there are slight variations in the spelling and pronunciation specific to the Baoulé. The Baoulé have a calendar that is different from the calendar of other Akan ethnic groups. This may be due to the circumstances of their departure from Ghana and the need for them to mark a separation with the Ashanti Empire. For ethnic groups such as the Ashanti, Abron, N'zima, Koffi may be a name for a boy child born on Friday. For the Baoulé, Koffi and Affoué are names for Saturday, the day being Foué. There is, therefore, a sound common to the day and the names.

Baoulé names:

- Saturday: Kouamé, Amoin; the name of the day is Monnin
- Sunday: Kouassi, Akissi; the name of the day is Kissie
- Monday: Kouadjo, Adjoua; the name of the day is Djole
- Tuesday: Konan, Amlan; the name of the day is Mlan
- Wednesday: Kouakou, Ahou; the name of the day is Ouwe
- Thursday: Yao, Aya; the name of the day is Yah
- Friday: Koffi, Affoué; the name of the day is Foue

Baoule name exceptions

1. The third girl or boy in a row is named I'nsan (often misspelled N’Guessan), independent of the child's gender.
2. The 9th child is given the name N'Goran, independent of the child's gender.
3. The 10th child in the family is always called Brou.
4. The 11th child from the same mother is called Loukou.
5. The 12th child from the same mother is called N'Gbin.

=== Education ===
Education in Ivory Coast is extremely competitive. Those families that can afford to give their children a private education to assure themselves that their children will receive a formal education. In the public schooling system, to progress beyond certain grade levels children must pass an exam regulated to allow a limited number of passing scores.

Most Ivorian children use a slate to practice their writing and other homework. Small notebooks are also widely available for doing homework and are turned in to be graded. Many homes have a wall with a large chalkboard where children are tutored or practice subjects that they have learned in class. In school, Baoulé children speak only French, but at home they speak their native language of Baoulé. French study begins in grade one.

Handwriting at Ivorian schools is always cursive, never printing.

== Baoulé economy ==
With regard to the Ivorian economy, coffee and cocoa are referred to as the chief cash crop. Up until the present day conflict, Ivory Coast was the world's largest exporter of cocoa. With respect to the local Ivorian economy, resources such as firewood and yams are transported to local markets and sold to other Ivorians or even foreigners. Within the local marketplace, one can find a wide array of goods, including tailored clothing, boiled eggs, popcorn and lingerie.

== Art ==
The Baoulé people have a wide array of artistic creations that play a major role in indigenous spirituality. There lies an onto-epistemological difference in the Western consumption of Baoulé art, and the indigenous application of their creations. As opposed to the Western focus of the physical stylization and technique of art, Baoulé people view their creation's significance through the lenses of linking the spiritual realm with the physical human world. Within the realm of the Baoulé art style, Western interpretation assigns a presence of a centered being being emitted from the representational art. The gestures and expressions assists the interpreted feeling with depictions of inward or collected statures. Their sculptures are renowned for their refinement, form diversity and the labor they represent. The sculptures do not only include face masks and human figurines, but also include a great variety of work in gold, bronze, wood, and ivory. Among the pieces, there will be a prevalence of the colors red and black; red being associated with women, and black being associated with men. Masks amongst the Baoulé people correspond to several types of dances: the goli glin, the kple kple, the gbagba (also known as mblo), and the bo nu amuin. Sculptures amongst the Baoulé people also include, but are not limited to: blolo bla, blolo bian, and bo usu.

=== Masks ===
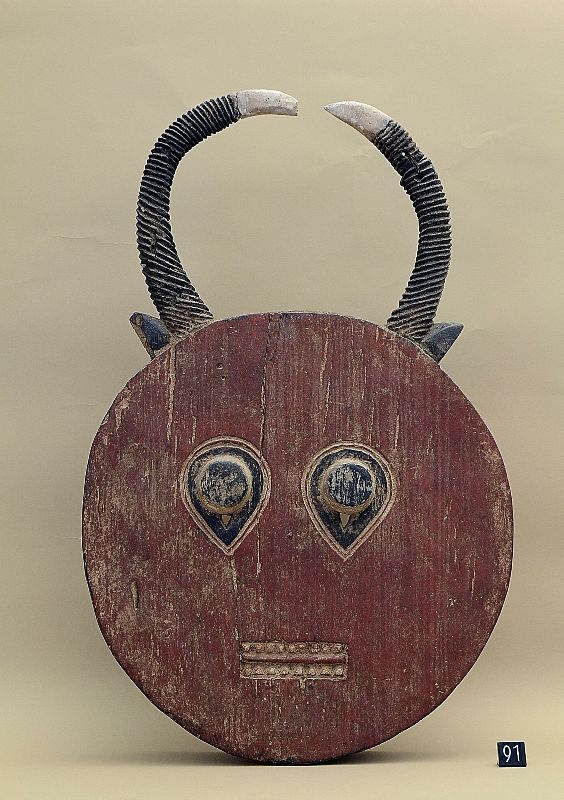
Example of a kple kple mask, with rounded horns and a rectangular mouth for the wearer to see through.

==== Goli Glin ====
One example of masks associated with dance is with the goli performance. It's said to be that the goli originated as early as the 18th century, but the addition of peoples to the goli family came from the assimilation of ethnic groups as a result of Western imperialism and colonization, which resulted in a growing number of peoples re-emphasizing their more ancient traditions. Many Baoulé art objects have restrictions, or are to be seen only by the individual for whom they were made or by a specific group of people. The restrictions applied to these masks are that, during the night, women are barred from witnessing the dance of the goli glin mask and take shelter in their homes; during the day, however, anyone was allowed to take in the performance. The look of the goli glin resembles that of an animal, sprouting horns along with a boxy, downward-facing muzzle that also allows the wearer to see through. The eyes are often on a sunken surface on opposing sides from the center, which displays vertical bars of varying colors.

==== Kple Kple ====
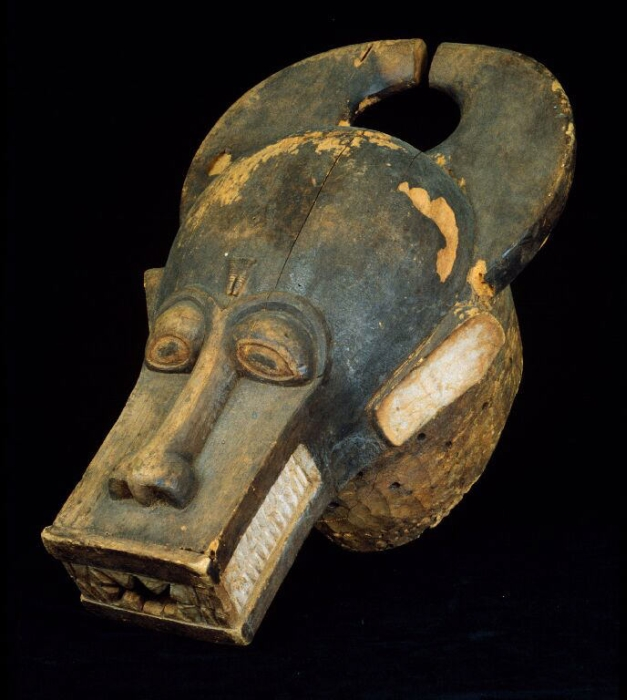
This is an example of a bo nu amuin mask, representing that of an animal with bared teeth.

One variation of the goli mask, are the kple kple masks, also known as kouassi gbe. Despite being related to the goli masks, they're not to the same level of significance; they are rather seen as mundane by the Baoulé peoples. The kple kple masks are seen as the offspring of the goli masks and are often worn by children as a means of entertaining themselves. They are rarely, if not never, used within the traditional goli performance. They are, however, still used in more playful and frivolous acts of dance. In appearance. they can have slight variations, but generally are in the shape of a circle or ellipse. They often consist of a main solid color, usually red or black, along with accents of other accompanying colors. The top portion sprouts rounding horns, and the face includes eyes, which can vary in shape, and a rectangular mouth that allows the wearer to see through. The back is draped in red netting and vegetable fibers, which conceals the majority of the wearer.

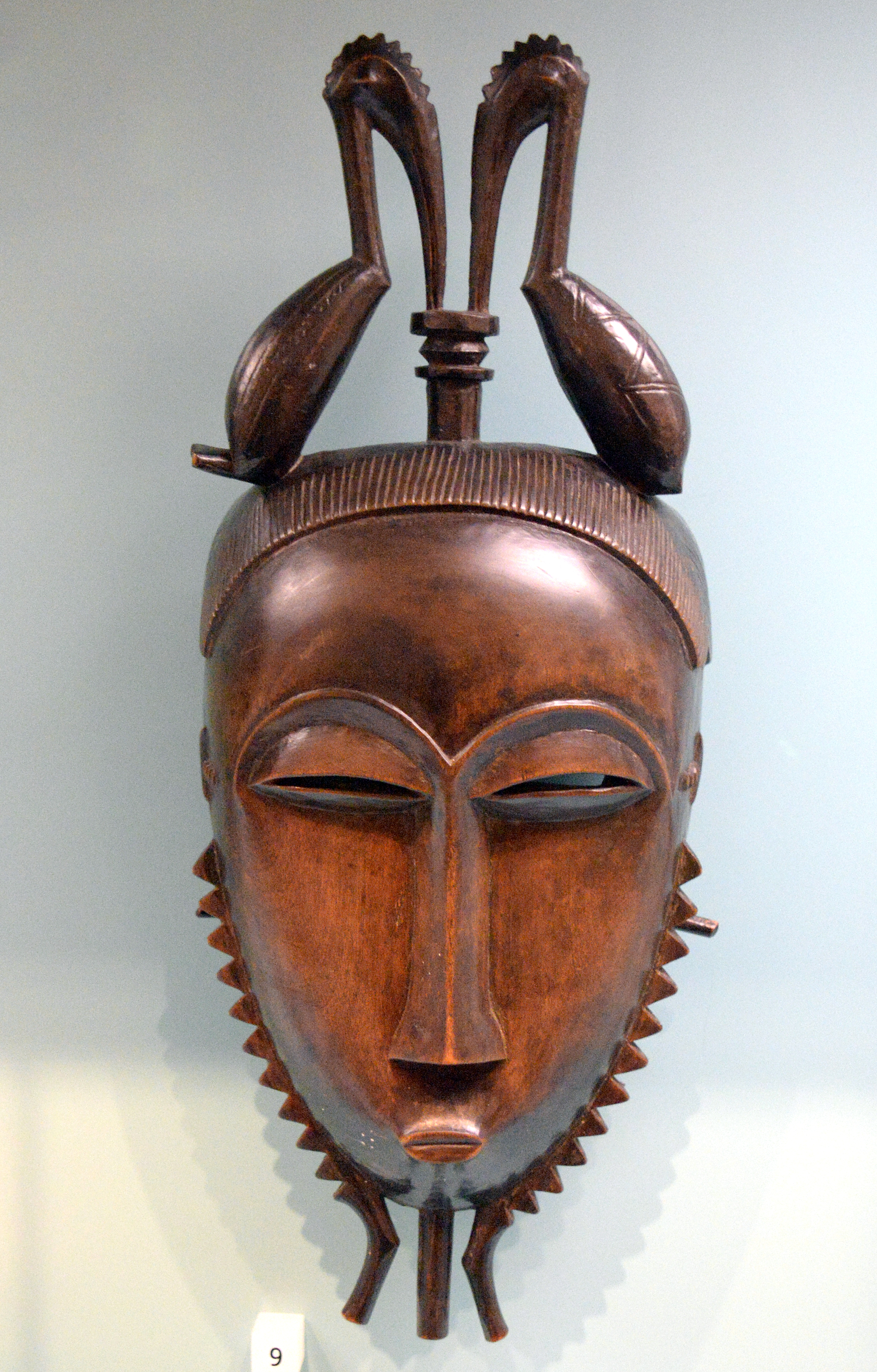
Example of a mblo mask, adorning various accessories on the to and sides of the head.

==== Bo Nu Amuin ====
Some pieces are often considered to be powerful spiritual objects. The most powerful spiritual objects are the men's sacred masks, bo nun amuin. Translated, bo nun amuin means "god risen from the bush". This mask is a boxy helmet mask representing a menacing animal with bared teeth. Viewing the mask is restricted to men, and if a woman or child sees the mask they risk serious injury or death. It is danced in times of trouble to protect the village and at important men's funerals. The dance assists the recent passing of those who've died in becoming spirits that can protect the following generations. When the bo nun amuin mask is danced, it can become very intense.

==== Gbagba or Mblo ====
The wooden carved masks, gbagba (more commonly known as mblo masks), are used for entertainment-based performances. The performance consists of a dance sequence, with the mask being worn with cloth drapery to cover the dancer. These masks in particular were designed to emphasize the beauty and authenticity of those whom it's meant to represent. There are applied elements to accentuate an idealized appearance with things such as body adornment or accessories and scarification. They are carved to represent the honoring of those significant to the carver or commissioner. The carvings offer a style that displays things such as squinted or closed eyes, elongated noses, and low positioned, oval-shaped mouths.

=== Sculpture ===
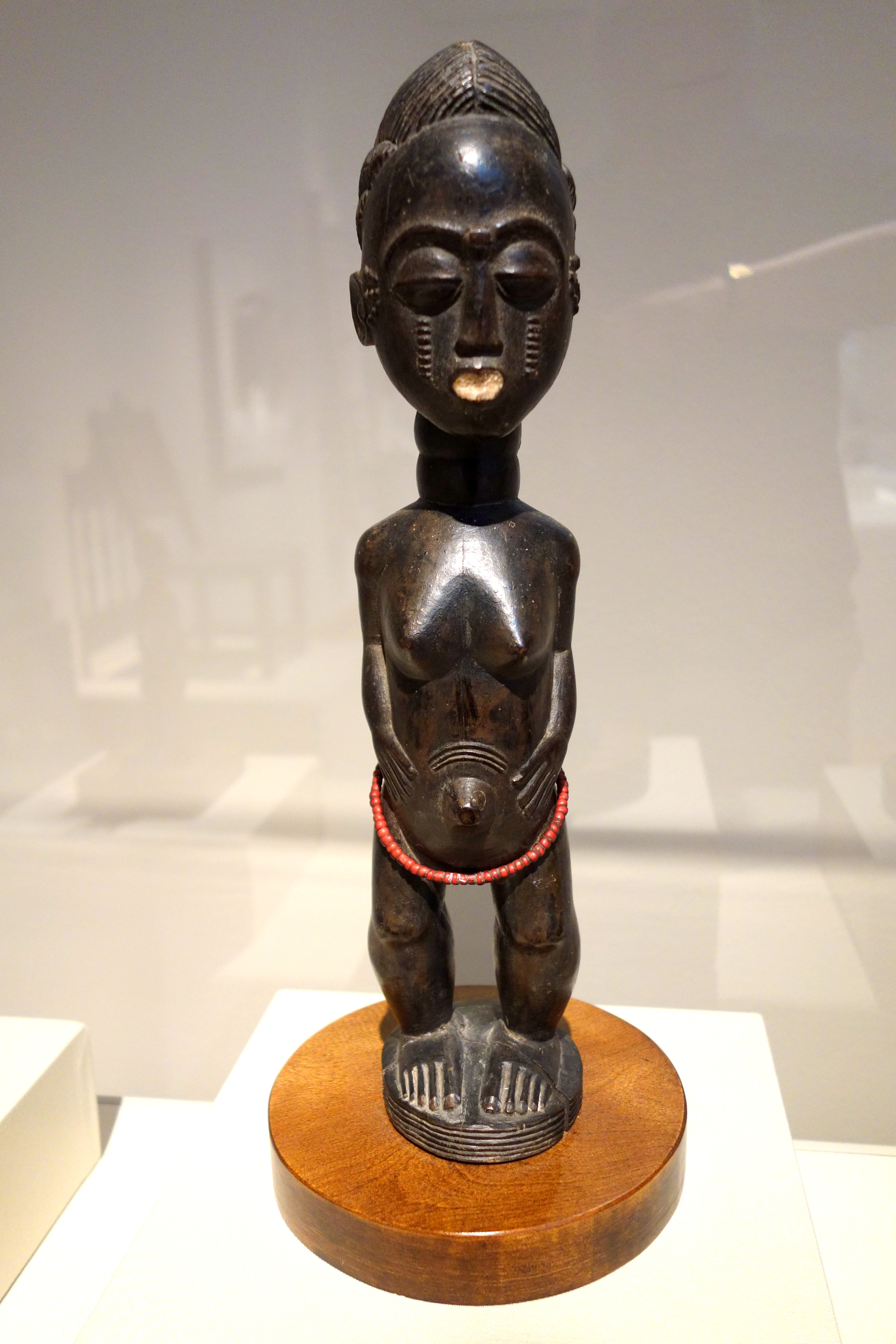
Example of a blolo bla (blolo woman) spirit-spouse that is held in a museum.

Sculptures played their role in Baoulé spirituality as a means of housing the zulu, the name of protective spirits. Waka sran, which means "wooden beings", allowed the zulu access to a bridge between the physical world and the spirit world. The waka sran were carved with the intention of giving the zulu identity, not carving them to replicate any one specific person. There were plentiful amounts of waka sran, each catered to their role with certain aspects of the region. Some examples of sculptures made are blolo bla and blolo bian (spirit-spouses); bo usu (hunting statuettes); and sculptures made for divinatory rituals.

==== Blolo Bla & Blolo Bian ====
The blolo bla (meaning blolo woman) and blolo bian (also called blolo yasua, meaning blolo man) sculptures are private objects made for an individual to represent their spirit spouse. The meaning of blolo is the realm of spirits, parallel to that of the physical realm, that cannot be view by the average individual. Each person has a spirit spouse from the other world, which they were married to before they were born into this world. People make offerings of food and money to their spirit spouse figures to keep them happy because they can influence their relationship with their earthly spouse or other earthly relationships and personal endeavors.

==== Bo Usu ====
Bo usu refer to the spirits of the forest, and is said by Alain-Michel Boyer in his research, to have a particular meaning: "bo being the word for the forest corridors lining the banks of streams and rivers, as opposed to the open savannah; and usu denoted genies, pixies, and all manner of supernatural beings with magical powers". The purpose of the statues are to assist hunters in attracting prey for a successful retrieval of meat. Hunters would often have multiple and leave them in different locations outside of their homes. Bo usu statues have a particular aesthetic of presenting in a coarse and rugged appearance. They would present human sexual anatomy along with anthropomorphic features in a static upright position. Hunters would use sacrificed bird blood, eggshell pieces, and kaolin dust to coat the figures, and if the hunt goes successful, they offer animal entrails to the spirits that assisted the hunter.

== Other economic activities ==
- Traditional pagne (also known as Kente cloth)
- Farming

== Baoulé cuisine ==
The staple food of the Ivorian diet is the yam. The yam is boiled, and, when cooled, mashed to be eaten. Cassava is also an integral part of the Baoulé cuisine.

Yams, in addition to maize, are stored until they are needed.

Foods other than yams are obtained from the local market. The most important food of the market is fish, wrapped in palm leaves, an economic alternative to wrapping paper. Ivorians typically eat meat from goats (chevon), sheep (mutton and lamb), and chickens, which are shared by the entire community. They milk their goats and get eggs from their chickens.

== Baoulé tools ==
One of the basic tools employed by the Baoulé populace is the machete. The machete's uses can include clearing vegetation or the construction of a paddle or canoe from logs. Another one of the tools employed by the Baoulé populace, is the snail shell, which is used for grounding and pounding tobacco, for the manufacture of snuffs. The Baoulé people are well known for their unique hand woven textiles. The village of Sakiaré consists of 95% population of skilled hand-weavers. The two most notable tools used by the Bauolé people are the shuttle and the beater. The shuttle is a hand made wooden boat shuttle used to in hand weaving to place the weft (horizontal) yarn between the warp (vertical) yarns, interweaving them to create a fabric. The beater is also another hand crafted tool that's made from yarn, straw, and yarn. The beater's function is to pull the inserted weft yarn from the shuttle forward towards the weaving structure to secure the yarn tightly - creating the fabric.

== Political structure ==
The Baoulé political structure is simple; several senior village leaders get together and discuss various issues affecting their village. Each village is ruled by a village-chief (for small villages) or by a queen or a king (for large villages) assisted by some notables or advisers. Queens and kings rarely speak in public, but via a spokesman. Villages were dependent on others to form a canton or a tribe. Each canton is also ruled by a queen or a king. Everyone has a say, even slaves, and everyone was friendly and social. Baoulé political organization is matriarchal and women's rights are very sacred.

== See also ==
- Baoulé language
- List of cities in Ivory Coast
